= List of civil parishes in Northumberland =

The civil parishes of Northumberland

This is a list of the 166 civil parishes in the ceremonial county of Northumberland, England. The whole of the county is parished.

== List of parishes ==
- Acklington (Note: Formerly Alnwick Rural District)
- Acomb (Note: Formerly Hexham Rural District)
- Adderstone with Lucker (Note: Formerly Belford Rural District)
- Akeld (Note: Formerly Glendale Rural District)
- Allendale
- Alnham (Note: Formerly Rothbury Rural District)
- Alnmouth
- Alnwick (town) (Note: Formerly Alnwick Urban District)
- Alwinton
- Amble by the Sea (town) (Note: Formerly Amble Urban District)
- Ancroft (Note: Formerly Norham and Islandshires Rural District)
- Ashington (town) (Note: Formerly Ashington Urban District)
- Bamburgh
- Bardon Mill (Note: Formerly Haltwhistle Rural District)
- Bavington (Note: Formerly Bellingham Rural District)
- Beadnell
- Belford
- Bellingham
- Belsay (Note: Formerly Castle Ward Rural District)
- Berwick-upon-Tweed (town) (Note: Formerly Berwick upon Tweed Municipal Borough)
- Bewick
- Biddlestone
- Birtley
- Blanchland
- Blyth (Note: Formerly Blyth Municipal Borough)
- Bowsden
- Branxton
- Brinkburn
- Broomhaugh and Riding
- Bywell
- Callaly
- Capheaton
- Carham
- Chatton
- Chillingham
- Chollerton
- Choppington (Note: Formerly Bedlingtonshire Urban District)
- Coanwood
- Corbridge
- Cornhill-on-Tweed
- Corsenside
- Cramlington (town) (Note: Formerly Seaton Valley Urban District)
- Craster
- Cresswell (Note: Formerly Morpeth Rural District)
- Denwick
- Doddington
- Duddo
- Earle
- East Bedlington
- East Chevington
- Edlingham
- Eglingham
- Ellingham
- Ellington and Linton
- Elsdon
- Embleton
- Ewart
- Falstone
- Featherstone
- Felton
- Ford
- Glanton
- Greenhead
- Greystead
- Haltwhistle (town)
- Harbottle
- Hartburn
- Hartleyburn
- Hauxley
- Haydon
- Healey
- Hebron
- Heddon-on-the-Wall
- Hedgeley
- Hedley
- Henshaw
- Hepple
- Hepscott
- Hesleyhurst
- Hexham (town) (Note: Formerly Hexham Urban District)
- Hexhamshire
- Hollinghill
- Holy Island
- Horncliffe
- Horsley
- Humshaugh
- Ilderton
- Ingram
- Kielder
- Kilham
- Kirknewton
- Kirkwhelpington
- Knaresdale with Kirkhaugh
- Kyloe
- Lesbury
- Lilburn
- Longframlington
- Longhirst
- Longhorsley
- Longhoughton
- Lowick
- Lynemouth
- Matfen
- Meldon
- Melkridge
- Middleton
- Milfield
- Mitford
- Morpeth (town) (Note: Formerly Morpeth Municipal Borough)
- Netherton
- Netherwitton
- Newbiggin by the Sea (Note: Formerly Newbiggin by the Sea Urban District)
- Newbrough
- Newton-by-the-Sea
- Newton-on-the-Moor and Swarland
- Norham
- North Sunderland
- Nunnykirk
- Ord
- Otterburn
- Ovingham
- Ovington
- Pegswood
- Plenmeller with Whitfield
- Ponteland (town)
- Prudhoe (town) (Note: Formerly Prudhoe Urban District)
- Rennington
- Rochester
- Roddam
- Rothbury
- Rothley
- Sandhoe
- Seaton Valley (community) (Note: Formerly Whitley Bay Municipal Borough)
- Shilbottle
- Shoreswood
- Shotley Low Quarter
- Simonburn
- Slaley
- Snitter
- Stamfordham
- Stannington
- Stocksfield
- Tarset
- Thirlwall
- Thirston
- Thropton
- Togston
- Tritlington and West Chevington
- Ulgham
- Wall
- Wallington Demesne
- Warden
- Wark
- Warkworth
- West Allen
- West Bedlington (town)
- Whalton
- Whittingham
- Whittington
- Whitton and Tosson
- Widdrington Station and Stobswood
- Widdrington Village
- Wooler
- Wylam

== See also ==
- List of civil parishes in England
