= Alnwick District =

Coordinates: 55°24′46″N 1°41′39″W

Alnwick
- Former district
- Shown within Northumberland
- Sovereign state: United Kingdom
- Constituent country: England
- Region: North East England
- Administrative county: Northumberland
- Founded: 1 April 1974
- Abolished: 1 April 2009
- Admin. HQ: Alnwick

Government
  - Type: Alnwick District Council
  - Leadership: Leader & Cabinet

Area
  - Total: 416.80 sq mi (1,079.51 km^{2})

Population (2001 Census)
  - Total: 32,300
  - Density: 77.5/sq mi (29.9/km^{2})
- Time zone: UTC+0 (Greenwich Mean Time)
  - Summer (DST): UTC+1 (British Summer Time)
- ONS code: 35UB
- Ethnicity: 99.6% White
- Website: alnwick.gov.uk

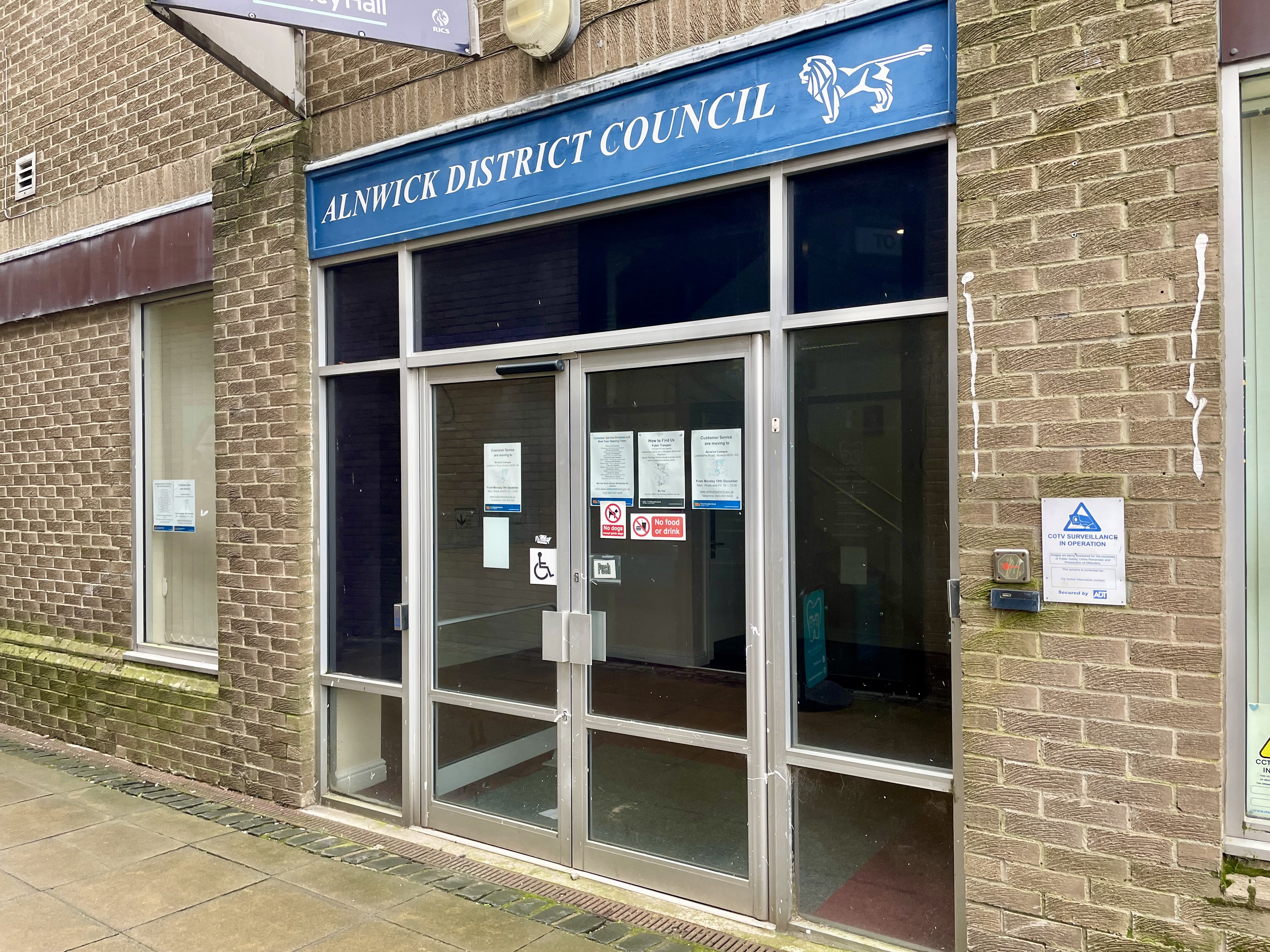
District council office in Alnwick town centre

Alnwick was a local government district of Northumberland, England. Its council was based in the town of Alnwick and the district had a population of 31,029 according to the 2001 census.

It was one of the most rural and sparsely populated districts in the United Kingdom, having a resident population of 31,029 in an area of 1,079.51 square kilometres, according to the 2001 census. (That is 29 persons per km² compared with the UK average of 245 persons per km².) Just over 50% of the population was located in the three main towns of Alnwick (7,600), Amble (6,100) and Rothbury (2,500), with the remainder dispersed across large and small villages, hamlets and isolated dwellings.

It was the second most racially homogeneous community in the country, in the terms measured in the 2001 census with 99.6% of the population recording their ethnicity as White.

The district was formed on 1 April 1974 as a merger of the urban districts of Alnwick and Amble and the rural districts of Alnwick and Rothbury. The district was abolished as part of structural changes to local government in England effective from 1 April 2009. Its responsibilities were transferred to Northumberland County Council, which became a unitary authority.

== Politics ==
Elections to the district council were held every 4 years from 1973 to the last election in 2007. Independents, Conservatives and Liberal Democrats held majorities on the council at different times, but from 1995 onwards no party had a majority. As of the last election in 2007 the council was composed of the following councillors:-

Year	Liberal Democrat	Conservative	Independent	Labour
2007	11	9	8	2

== Settlements and parishes ==
The district included the settlements and parishes of:

- Acklington, Alnham, Alnmouth, Alnwick, Alwinton, Amble By the Sea
- Biddlestone, Brinkburn
- Callaly, Cartington, Craster
- Denwick
- Edlingham, Eglingham, Elsdon, Embleton
- Felton
- Glanton
- Harbottle, Hauxley, Hedgeley, Hepple, Hesleyhurst, Hollinghill
- Lesbury, Longframlington, Longhoughton
- Netherton, Newton-by-the-Sea, Newton-on-the-Moor and Swarland, Nunnykirk
- Rennington, Rothbury, Rothley
- Shilbottle, Snitter
- Thropton, Togston
- Warkworth, Whittingham, Whitton and Tosson

== Main towns ==
=== Alnwick ===
Alnwick was the largest of the three main towns in the district. It is a reasonably busy rural market town. According to Country Life, October 2002, "Alnwick is the most picturesque market town in Northumberland, and the best place to live in Britain". The town dates back approximately to the 7th century, and is the ancestral seat of the Duke of Northumberland, who still resides at Alnwick Castle. Historically, Alnwick was a fortified town, an agricultural centre and a staging post on the Great North Road between Edinburgh and London. The fabric of the town, in parts, reflects its history, although there has been much contemporary development.

=== Amble ===
The historic port of Amble is located on the River Coquet estuary and is the southern gateway to Northumberland's Heritage Coast.

=== Rothbury ===
Rothbury is a picturesque historic market town with its origins dating back to the 11th century. It is situated on the River Coquet, and provides a gateway to Upper Coquetdale and the Northumberland National Park.
