= Hollinghill =

Coordinates: 55.2450°N 1.9644°W

- Civil parish
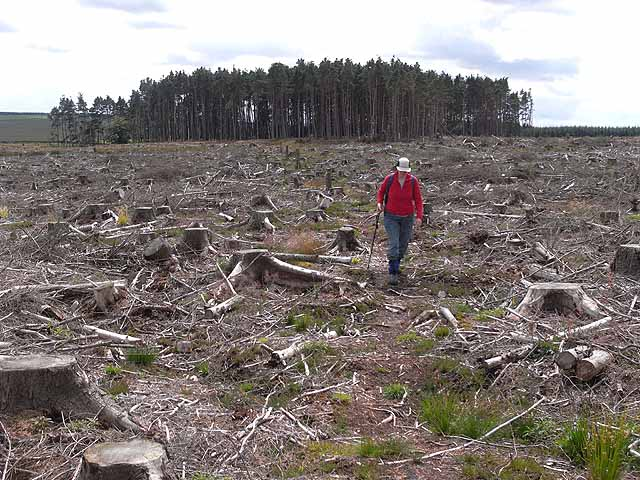
- St Oswald's Way, north of Fallowlees

- Location within Northumberland
- Area: 58.89 km^{2} (22.74 sq mi)
- Population: 104 (2024 estimate)
  - Density: 2/km^{2} (5.2/sq mi)
- Civil parish: Hollinghill
- Unitary authority: Northumberland
- Ceremonial county: Northumberland
- Region: North East
- Country: England
- Sovereign state: United Kingdom
- Main settlements: Harwood
- Police: Northumbria
- Fire: Northumberland
- Ambulance: North East

Hollinghill or Hellinghill is a civil parish in the county of Northumberland, England. The parish includes the hamlet of Harwood. It is about 18 miles from Morpeth, part of the parish is in Northumberland National Park. The parish borders Hepple, Hesleyhurst, Nunnykirk, Rothley and Whitton and Tosson. The parish shares a parish council with Rothley called "Rothley with Hollinghill Parish Council". There are 4 listed buildings in Hollinghill. In 2024 the parish had an estimated population of 104.

== History ==
Hollinghill was historically a township in the ancient parish of Rothbury, in 1866, the legal definition of 'parish' was changed to be the areas used for administering the poor laws, and so Hollinghill became a civil parish. In 1894 Hollinghill became part of Rothbury Rural District, on 1 April 1955 the parishes of Fallowlees, Greenleighton and Harwood were abolished and merged with Hollinghill. In 1974 Hollinghill became part of Alnwick non-metropolitan district. In 2009 it became part of the unitary authority area of Northumberland when the six districts of Northumberland were merged into one.
