= Alnwick Urban District =

Former local authority area in Northumberland, England

Coordinates: 55.412°N 1.706°W

Alnwick Urban District was an urban district in Northumberland, England, based on Alnwick. It was created in 1894 and abolished in 1974 when it was replaced by Alnwick District.
