= Bowsden =

Village in Northumberland, England

Coordinates: 55.667°N 2.007°W

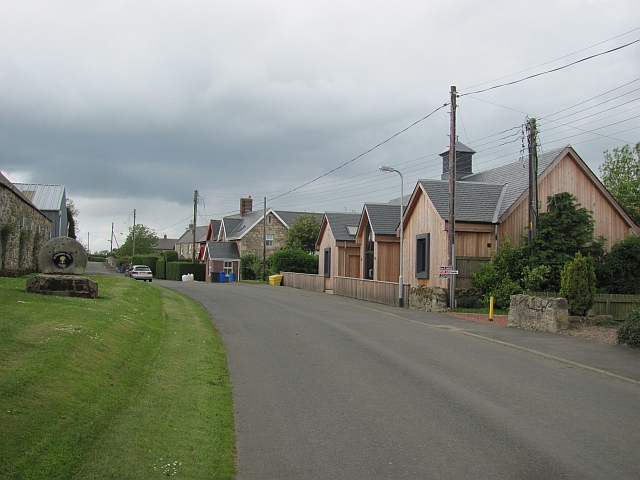

- Location within Northumberland
- Population: 178 (2011)
- OS grid reference: NT995415
- Unitary authority: Northumberland
- Ceremonial county: Northumberland
- Region: North East
- Country: England
- Sovereign state: United Kingdom
- Post town: BERWICK UPON TWEED
- Postcode district: TD15
- Police: Northumbria
- Fire: Northumberland
- Ambulance: North East
- UK Parliament: Berwick-upon-Tweed

Bowsden is a village and civil parish in Northumberland, England. It is about 6 miles (10 km) to the south of Berwick-upon-Tweed, inland from the North Sea coast at Lindisfarne, and has a population of 157, rising to 178 at the 2011 Census.

== Landmarks ==
The Devil's Causeway passes the village about 1 mile (2 km) to the east. The causeway is a Roman road which starts at Port Gate on Hadrian's Wall, north of Corbridge, and extends 55 miles (89 km) northwards across Northumberland to the mouth of the River Tweed at Berwick-upon-Tweed.
