= East Chevington =

Civil parish in Northumberland, England

Coordinates: 55.288°N 1.607°W

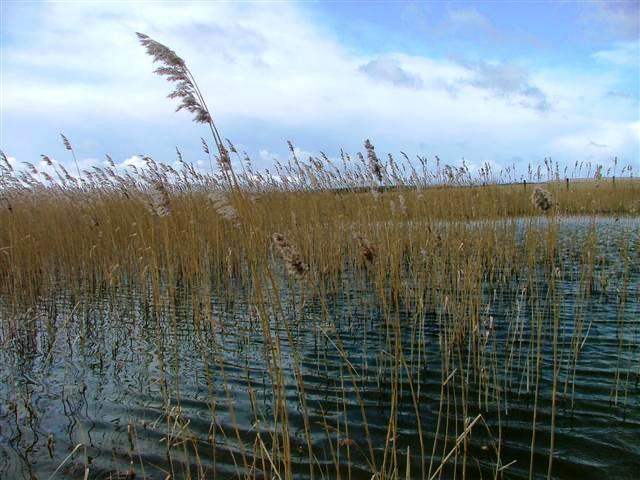
- A pond in the East Chevington Nature Reserve

- Location within Northumberland
- Population: 3,951 (2011)
- Civil parish: East Chevington
- Unitary authority: Northumberland
- Ceremonial county: Northumberland
- Region: North East
- Country: England
- Sovereign state: United Kingdom
- Post town: Morpeth
- Postcode district: NE65
- Police: Northumbria
- Fire: Northumberland
- Ambulance: North East

East Chevington is a parish in Northumberland, England, and was a village until it disappeared in the 1900s.

In 2001, the parish had a population of 3,192, increasing to 3,951 at the 2011 Census.

== History ==
The site of the village was inhabited and the surrounding area used for agriculture at least as far back as the medieval period. Crop marks visible from the air suggest that the site may have been inhabited as far back as Roman times, however. An ordnance survey map from 1866 shows that there was a blacksmith's workshop in the village at that time. During World War II, various defences were established near the village, including anti-tank cubes on Druridge Bay beach.

== Chevington drift ==
There is a memorial stone on the site of the old drift entrance. The plaque is inscribed

The site of the former East Chevington Drift Mine. This 5 tonne limestone boulder was preserved from East Chevington Open Cast Coal Site which worked 1982–1994 and now stands on the site of East Chevington Drift Mine which operated 1882–1962.

== See also ==
- Drift mining
- List of civil parishes in Northumberland
- Northumberland Wildlife Trust
