= Earle, Northumberland =

Village in Northumberland, England

Coordinates: 55.532°N 2.025°W

Earle
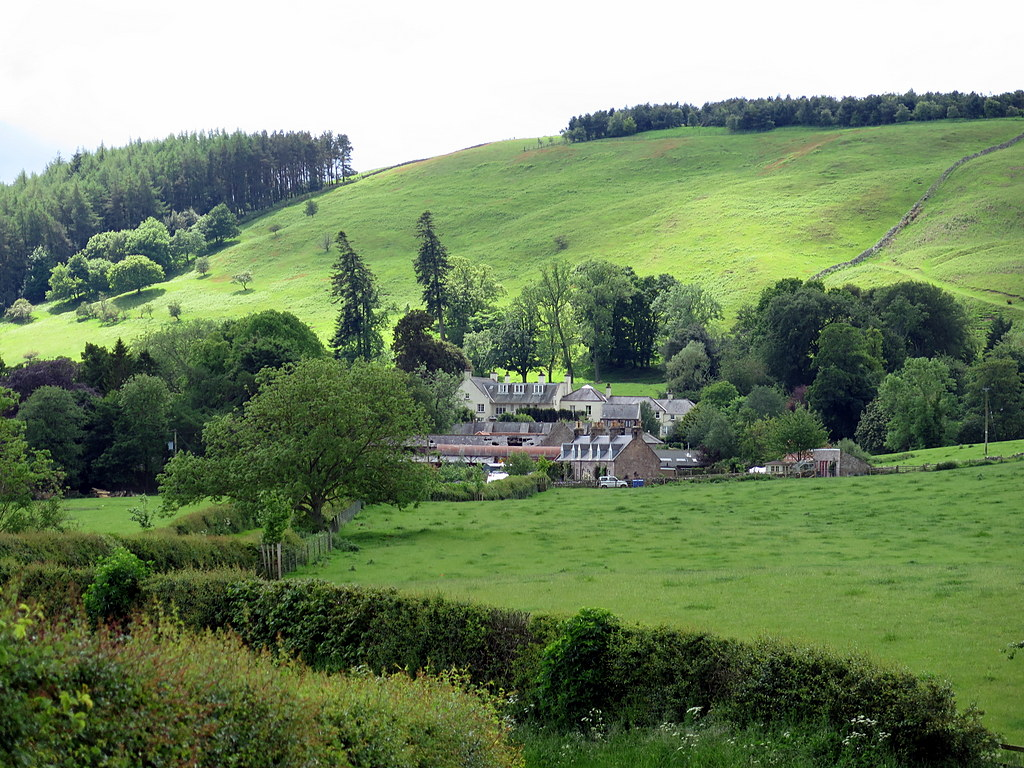
- View of Earle

- Location within Northumberland
- Population: 89 (2001 census)
- OS grid reference: NT985265
- Civil parish: Earle
- Unitary authority: Northumberland
- Ceremonial county: Northumberland
- Region: North East
- Country: England
- Sovereign state: United Kingdom
- Post town: WOOLER
- Postcode district: NE71
- Dialling code: 01668
- Police: Northumbria
- Fire: Northumberland
- Ambulance: North East
- UK Parliament: Berwick-upon-Tweed

Earle is a village and civil parish in county of Northumberland, England. It has around 20 inhabitants and is about 2 miles (3 km) from Wooler (where from the Census 2011 the population is included). It is a popular walking area with many walks passing through Earle on their way to the Cheviot Hills.

== History ==
Earle was historically in Doddington parish.

== Governance ==
Earle is in the parliamentary constituency of Berwick-upon-Tweed.
