= Hesleyhurst =

Coordinates: 55.271804°N 1.872058°W

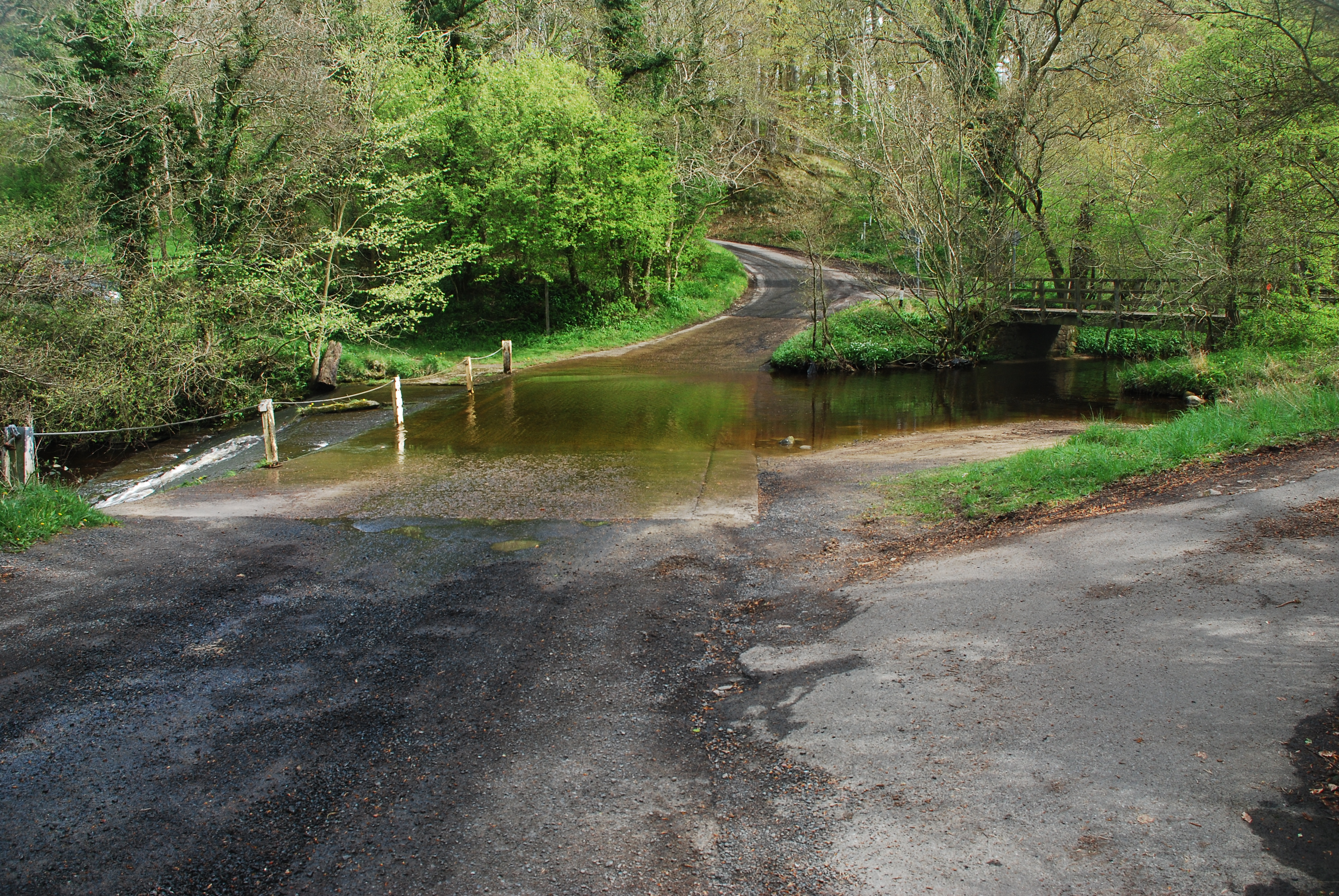
- Ford across the Forest Burn in Hesleyhurst

- Location within Northumberland
- Population: 30 (2001 census)
- Civil parish: Hesleyhurst
- Unitary authority: Northumberland
- Ceremonial county: Northumberland
- Region: North East
- Country: England
- Sovereign state: United Kingdom
- Post town: Morpeth
- Postcode district: NE65
- Police: Northumbria
- Fire: Northumberland
- Ambulance: North East

Hesleyhurst is a civil parish in the county of Northumberland in England. At the 2011 Census the population was only minimal. It is served by a joint parish council with nearby Brinkburn.

== History ==
Hesleyhurst is a sparsely populated hamlet. During the British Iron Age, there was a hillfort in the area but it had gone out of use after the Romans had invaded. Due to constant raids from border reivers in the 13th century, defensive bastle farmhouses were constructed to defend the local population. The modern hamlet is based around Embleton Terrace, which was constructed in 1926 to house coal miners at the nearby Lee Colliery, which had been abandoned a year prior due to flooding. The lease to the land was sold in 1929 with "TGR with 30 cotts and bldgs erctd thron" (30 cottages and building erected thereon) for £1,500 to colliery owner Charles Nelson who then sold it for £2,300 to John Snaith.

Hesleyhurst was originally within Rothbury parish in the 19th century but eventually split to become its own independent parish. Though Hesleyhurst is its own parish, it is governed by a joint parish council with neighbouring Brinkburn. Together they run the council which meets four times a year, with five members elected by Brinkburn residents and two elected by Hesleyhurst residents. It is also within the jurisdiction of Northumberland County Council after Alnwick District council was dissolved.

== Freedom of the Parish ==
The following people and military units have received the Freedom of the Parish of Brinkburn and Hesleyhurst.

=== Individuals ===
- Vincent Milburn: 17 May 2025.
- Peter Roberts: 17 May 2025.
