= 2007 Alnwick District Council election =

2007 UK local government election

Results of the 2007 Alnwick District Council election

Elections to Alnwick District Council were held for the final time on 3 May 2007. The whole council was up for election and the council stayed under no overall control. The council was abolished in 2009 when Northumberland County Council became a unitary authority.

== Election result ==
Alnwick local election result 2007
Party	Seats	Gains	Losses	Net gain/loss	Seats %	Votes %	Votes	+/−
Liberal Democrats	11	2	2	0	36.7	41.1	7,422	+11.1
Conservative	9	7	0	+7	30.0	23.9	4,309	+19.8
Independent	8	1	8	-7	26.7	31.3	5,655	-22.4
Labour	2	0	0	0	6.7	3.0	537	-8.6
UKIP	0	0	0	0	0.0	0.7	132	+0.1

== Ward results ==
Alnwick Castle (3)
Party	Candidate	Votes	%	±%
Liberal Democrats	Susan Bell	453		
Conservative	John Hope	390		
Independent	Andrew Harrington	360		
Liberal Democrats	James Reid	345		
Liberal Democrats	Bryan Thompson	331		
Independent	Teresa Thompson	287		
Turnout		2,166	33.4	
Liberal Democrats hold		Swing		
Conservative gain from Independent		Swing		
Independent hold		Swing		

Alnwick Clayport (2)
Party	Candidate	Votes	%	±%
Liberal Democrats	Kenneth Gray	254		
Liberal Democrats	Eileen Blakey	194		
Independent	Kevin Thompson	150		
Conservative	Aidan Ruff	41		
Turnout		639	23.8	+3.1
Liberal Democrats hold		Swing		
Liberal Democrats hold		Swing		

Alnwick Hotspur (2)
Party	Candidate	Votes	%	±%
Independent	Gordon Castle	467		
Liberal Democrats	Clare Mills	323		
Liberal Democrats	Andrew Smith	226		
Independent	Geoffrey Watson	219		
Turnout		1,235	37.2	+5.5
Independent hold		Swing		
Liberal Democrats gain from Independent		Swing		

Amble Central (2)
Party	Candidate	Votes	%	±%
Independent	Audrey Jones	258		
Labour	Elizabeth Gray	210		
Independent	Katherine Bennett	191		
Independent	Thomas Evans	105		
Conservative	Elizabeth Rixon	34		
Conservative	Cynthia Sharp	22		
Turnout		820	27.4	−2.6
Independent hold		Swing		
Labour hold		Swing		

Amble East (2)
Party	Candidate	Votes	%	±%
Labour	George Arckless	327		
Independent	John Hedley	183		
Independent	Mark Shipperlee	123		
Independent	George Smailes	112		
Conservative	Alan Downie	60		
Conservative	Charles Skipper	57		
Turnout		862	28.0	+0.8
Labour hold		Swing		
Independent gain from Liberal Democrats		Swing		

Amble West (2)
Party	Candidate	Votes	%	±%
Liberal Democrats	Ian Hinson	346		
Conservative	Leslie Bilboe	178		
Independent	Carl Oliver	169		
Turnout		693	31.0	−2.0
Liberal Democrats hold		Swing		
Conservative gain from Independent		Swing		

Embleton
Party	Candidate	Votes	%	±%
Conservative	Robert Thorp	254	53.2	+53.2
Liberal Democrats	Lydia Cairns	223	46.8	−9.6
Majority		31	6.4	N/A
Turnout		477	66.4	+11.0
Conservative gain from Liberal Democrats		Swing		

Harbottle and Elsdon
Party	Candidate	Votes	%	±%
Conservative	Susan Bolam	256	61.4	
Liberal Democrats	Paul Cowie	161	38.6	
Majority		95	22.8	
Turnout		417	54.1	
Conservative hold		Swing		

Hedgeley
Party	Candidate	Votes	%	±%
Independent	John Taylor	289	83.8	
Conservative	Helen Ruff	56	16.2	
Majority		233	67.6	
Turnout		345	47.4	
Independent hold		Swing		

Lesbury (2)
Party	Candidate	Votes	%	±%
Independent	Hugh Philipson	540		
Liberal Democrats	Roger Styring	480		
Conservative	Anne Glassey	167		
UKIP	Michael Weatheritt	132		
Turnout		1,319	52.8	+1.3
Independent hold		Swing		
Liberal Democrats hold		Swing		

Longframlington
Party	Candidate	Votes	%	±%
Conservative	Trevor Thorne	458	77.0	
Liberal Democrats	Lynne Roxburgh	137	23.0	
Majority		321	54.0	
Turnout		595	60.0	
Conservative hold		Swing		

Longhoughton with Craster and Rennington (2)
Party	Candidate	Votes	%	±%
Liberal Democrats	Carol Grey	418		
Conservative	Thomas Spence	336		
Conservative	Dominic Coupe	289		
Turnout		1,043	41.4	+2.5
Liberal Democrats hold		Swing		
Conservative gain from Independent		Swing		

Rothbury and South Rural (3)
Party	Candidate	Votes	%	±%
Liberal Democrats	Peter Dawson	722		
Liberal Democrats	Steven Bridgett	587		
Conservative	Elisabeth Bainbridge	522		
Liberal Democrats	Andrew Duffield	496		
Independent	Alan Renton	488		
Conservative	Ian Glendinning	476		
Turnout		3,291	51.4	
Liberal Democrats hold		Swing		
Liberal Democrats hold		Swing		
Conservative gain from Independent		Swing		

Shilbottle (3)
Party	Candidate	Votes	%	±%
Independent	Maria Haddow	683		
Liberal Democrats	Ether Mills	529		
Conservative	David Rixon	519		
Liberal Democrats	William Blakey	462		
Turnout		2,193	46.8	+6.6
Independent hold		Swing		
Liberal Democrats hold		Swing		
Conservative gain from Independent		Swing		

Warkworth (2)
Party	Candidate	Votes	%	±%
Independent	Jeffrey Watson	533		
Liberal Democrats	John Hobrough	416		
Independent	Alison Sharpe	326		
Liberal Democrats	Roger Cashmore	319		
Turnout		1,594	47.9	+9.1
Independent hold		Swing		
Liberal Democrats gain from Independent		Swing		

Whittingham
Party	Candidate	Votes	%	±%
Conservative	Zoe Frais	197	53.4	+53.4
Independent	John Rutherford	172	46.6	−14.4
Majority		25	6.8	N/A
Turnout		369	47.7	+8.1
Conservative gain from Independent		Swing		
