= Northumberland =

County of England

- Ceremonial county
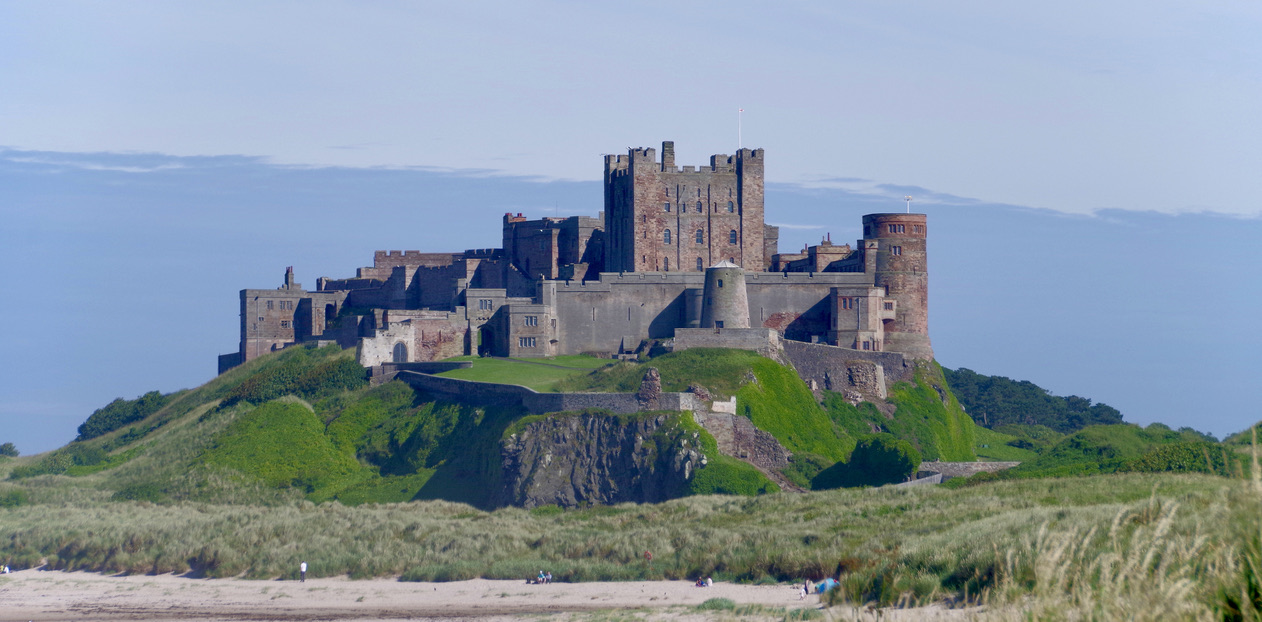
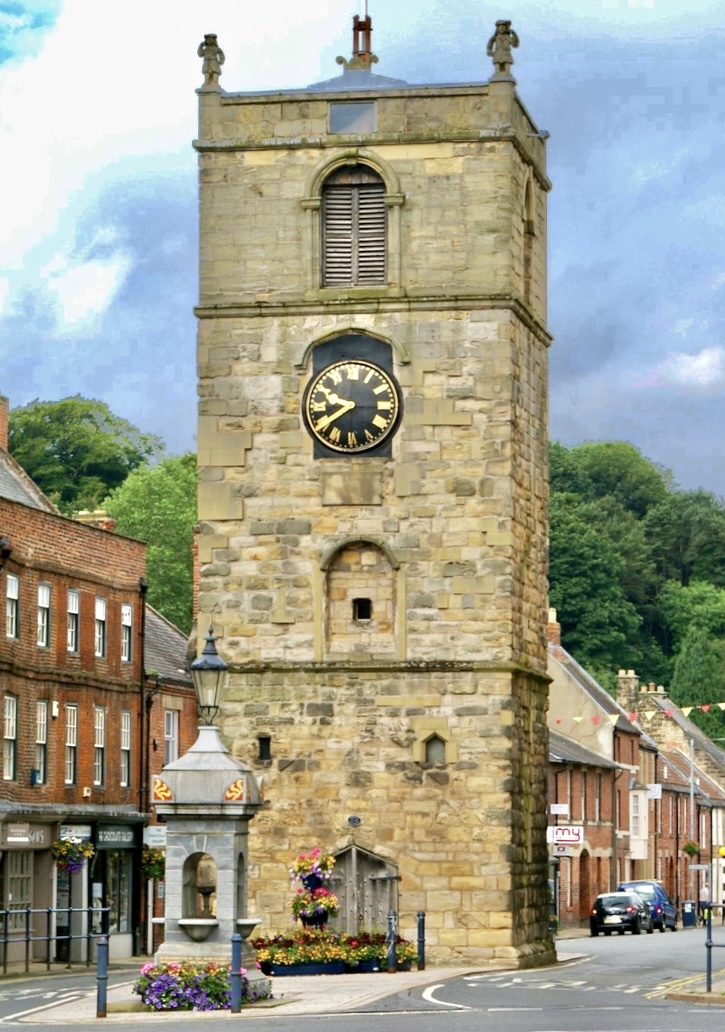
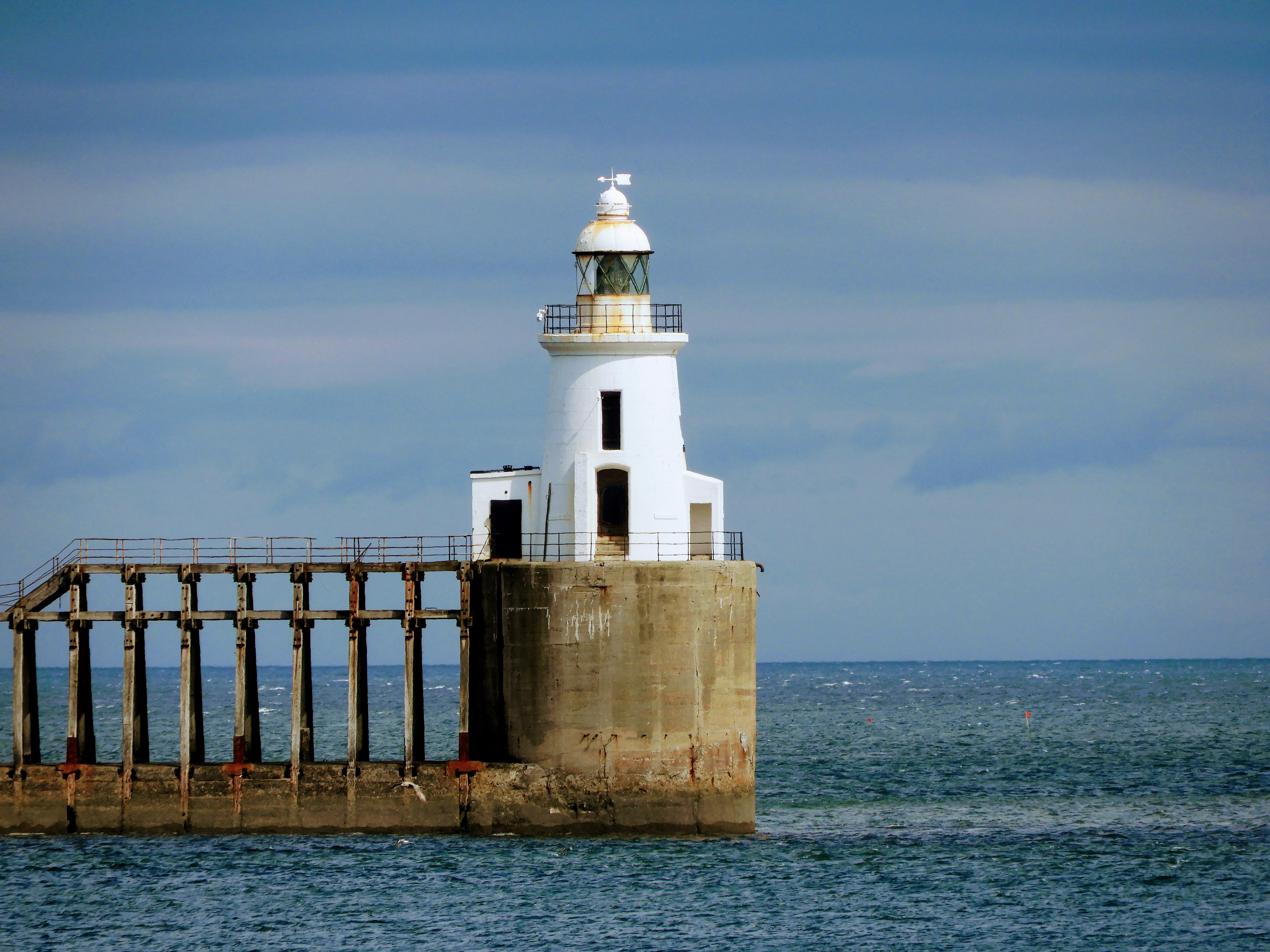
- Bamburgh Castle; Morpeth Clock Tower; and the lighthouse on East Pier, Blyth

- Ceremonial Northumberland Historic Northumberland
- Coordinates: 55°10′N 2°0′W
- Sovereign state: United Kingdom
- Constituent country: England
- Region: North East
- Established: Ancient; 12th century
- Time zone: UTC+0 (GMT)
  - Summer (DST): UTC+1 (BST)
- UK Parliament: 4 MPs: David Smith (L); Ian Lavery (L); Joe Morris (L); Emma Foody (L)
- Fire: Northumberland Fire & Rescue Service
- County town: Morpeth
- Largest town: Blyth (ceremonial); Newcastle (historic)
- Ceremonial county
- Lord Lieutenant: Dr Caroline Pryer
- High Sheriff: Anna Maria Charlton
- Area: 5,020 km^{2} (1,940 sq mi)
  - Rank: 6th of 48
- Population (2024): 331,420
  - Rank: 44th of 48
  - Density: 66/km^{2} (170/sq mi)
- Unitary authority
- Council: Northumberland County Council
- Control: No overall control
- Admin HQ: Morpeth
- Area: 5,020 km^{2} (1,940 sq mi)
  - Rank: 2nd of 296
- Population (2025): 333,975
  - Rank: 35th of 296
  - Density: 67/km^{2} (170/sq mi)
- ISO 3166-2: GB-NBL
- GSS code: E06000057
- ITL: TLC21
- Website: www.northumberland.gov.uk

Northumberland (/nɔːrˈθʌmbərlənd/) is a ceremonial county in North East England, on the border with Scotland. It is bordered by the North Sea to the east, Tyne and Wear and County Durham to the south, Cumbria to the west, and the Scottish Borders council area to the north. The town of Blyth is the largest settlement. Northumberland is the northernmost county in England.

The county has an area of 5,013 km^{2} (1,936 sq mi) and had an estimated population of 331,420 in 2024, making it the least-densely populated county in England. The south-east contains the largest towns: Blyth, Cramlington, Ashington, Bedlington, and Morpeth, the last of which is the administrative centre. The remainder of the county is rural, the largest towns being Berwick-upon-Tweed in the far north and Hexham in the south-west. For local government purposes Northumberland is a unitary authority area. The county historically included the parts of Tyne and Wear north of the River Tyne.

The west of Northumberland contains part of the Cheviot Hills and North Pennines, while to the east the land becomes flatter before reaching the coast. The Cheviot (815 m (2,674 ft)), after which the range of hills is named, is the county's highest point. The county contains the source of the River North Tyne and much of the South Tyne; near Hexham they combine to form the Tyne, which exits into Tyne and Wear shortly downstream. The other major rivers in Northumberland are, from south to north, the Blyth, Wansbeck, Coquet, Aln and Tweed, the last of which forms part of the Scottish border. The county contains Northumberland National Park and two national landscapes: the Northumberland Coast and part of the North Pennines.

Much of the county's history has been defined by its position on a border. In the Roman era most of the county lay north of Hadrian's Wall, and the region was contested between England and Scotland into the Early Modern era, leading to the construction of many castles, peel towers and bastle houses, and the early modern fortifications at Berwick-upon-Tweed. Northumberland is also associated with Celtic Christianity, particularly the tidal island of Lindisfarne. During the Industrial Revolution the area had significant coal mining, shipbuilding, and armaments industries.

== History ==
=== Name origin ===
The name of Northumberland is recorded in the Anglo-Saxon Chronicle as norð hẏmbra land, meaning "the land north of the Humber". The name of the kingdom of Northumbria derives from the Old English Norþan-hymbre meaning "the people or province north of the Humber", as opposed to Southumbria, south of the Humber Estuary.

=== Before the county ===
The land has long been an English frontier zone, and it is now bordered to the north by Scotland. Northumberland has a rich prehistory with many instances of rock art, hillforts such as Yeavering Bell, and stone circles such as the Goatstones and Duddo Five Stones. Most of the area was occupied by the Brythonic-Celtic Votadini people, with another large tribe, the Brigantes, to the south.

During the Roman occupation of Britain, most of the present county lay north of Hadrian's Wall. It was controlled by Rome only for the brief period of its extension of power north to the Antonine Wall. The Roman road Dere Street crosses the county from Corbridge over high moorland west of the Cheviot Hills to Melrose, Scottish Borders (Latin: Trimontium). As evidence of its border position through medieval times, Northumberland has more castles than any other county in England, including prominent ones at Alnwick, Bamburgh, Dunstanburgh, Newcastle, and Warkworth.

Nearly 2,000-year-old Roman boxing gloves were uncovered at Vindolanda in 2017 by the Vindolanda Trust experts, led by Andrew Birley. Being similar in style and function to the full-hand modern boxing gloves, those found at Vindolanda look like leather bands dating back to 120 AD. It is suggested that, based on their difference from gladiator gloves, the gloves were not used in mortal combat, but rather in a sport for promoting fighting skills. The gloves are currently displayed at Vindolanda's museum.

Present-day Northumberland formed the core of the Anglian kingdom of Bernicia from about 547. It was united with Deira (south of the River Tees) to form the kingdom of Northumbria in the 7th century. The boundaries of Northumbria under King Edwin (reigned 616–633) stretched from the Humber in the south to the Forth in the north. Northumberland is often called the "cradle of Christianity" in England because Christianity flourished on Lindisfarne—a tidal island north of Bamburgh, also called Holy Island—after King Oswald of Northumbria (r. 634–642) invited monks from Iona to come to convert the English. The monastery at Lindisfarne was the centre of production of the Lindisfarne Gospels (around 700). It became the home of St Cuthbert (c. 634–687, abbot from c. 665), who is buried in Durham Cathedral.

The Kingdom of Northumbria fragmented into a series of successor states following the Viking invasion. In the south, Viking settlers established the Kingdom of York between the Humber and Tees. However, Viking influence petered out at the Tees, with the river serving as the northern boundary of the Danelaw. Between the Tyne and Tees rivers, the Community of St. Cuthbert emerged as the successors to the Bishops of Lindisfarne; north of the Tyne, the earls of Bamburgh, who traced their lineage back to the Kings of Northumbria, continued to exercise authority and governance over this northern expanse. York was eventually integrated as a shire into the unified Kingdom of England by the House of Wessex. However, the West Saxon governmental structures were not extended beyond Tees, leaving the Earldom of Bamburgh and the Community of St. Cuthbert as contested buffer states with the emerging Kingdom of Scotland.

After the battle of Nechtansmere, Northumbrian influence north of the Tweed began to decline as the Picts gradually reclaimed the land previously invaded by the Anglian kingdom. In 1018, its northern part, the region between the Tweed and the Forth (including Lothian, which includes present-day Edinburgh), was ceded to the Kingdom of Scotland.

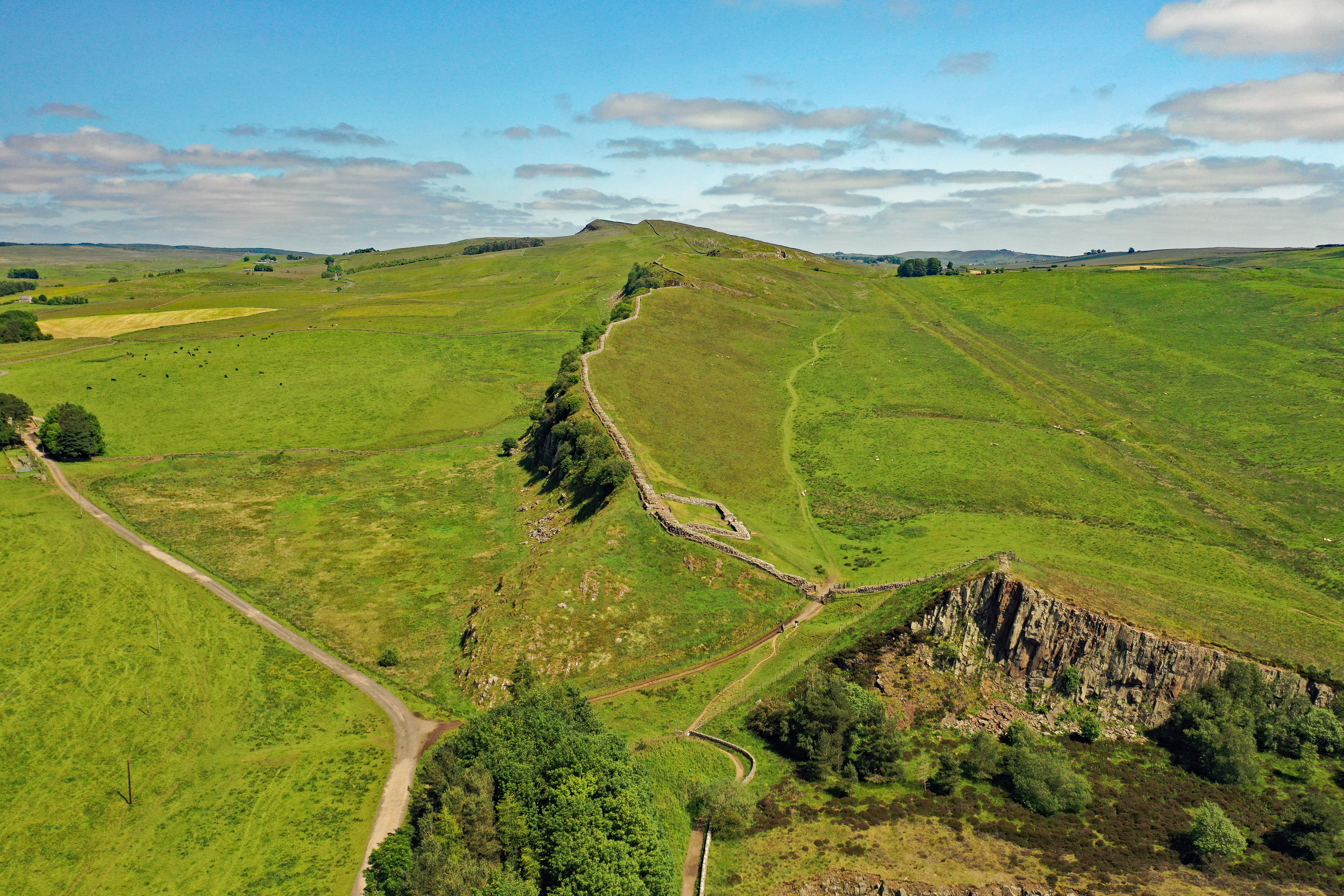
Hadrian's Wall

An early mention of Northumberland as norð hẏmbra land "north of Humber land" in the Anglo-Saxon Chronicle

=== As a county ===
The Earldom of Northumberland was briefly held by the Scottish royal family by marriage, between 1139–1157 and 1215–1217. Scotland relinquished all claims to the region as part of the Treaty of York (1237). The earls of Northumberland once wielded significant power in English affairs because, as powerful and militaristic lords in the Scottish Marches, they had the task of protecting England from Scottish retaliation for English invasions.

Northumberland has a history of revolt and rebellion against the government, as seen in the Rising of the North (1569–1570) against Elizabeth I. These revolts were usually led by the earls of Northumberland, the Percy family. Shakespeare makes one of the Percys, the dashing Harry Hotspur (1364–1403), the hero of his Henry IV, Part 1. The Percys were often aided in conflict by other powerful Northern families, such as the Nevilles and the Patchetts. The latter were stripped of all power and titles by the victorious Parliamentarians after the English Civil War of 1642–1651.

After the Restoration in 1660, the county was a centre for Roman Catholicism in England, as well as a focus of Jacobite support. Northumberland was long a wild county, where outlaws and Border Reivers hid from the law. However, the frequent cross-border skirmishes and accompanying local lawlessness largely subsided after the Union of the Crowns of Scotland and England under King James I and VI in 1603.

Northumberland played a key role in the Industrial Revolution from the 18th century on. Many coal mines operated in Northumberland until the widespread closures in the 1970s and 1980s. Collieries operated at Ashington, Bedlington, Blyth, Choppington, Netherton, Ellington, and Pegswood. The region's coalfields fuelled industrial expansion in other areas of Britain, and the need to transport the coal from the collieries to the Tyne led to the development of the first railways. Shipbuilding and armaments manufacture were other important industries before the deindustrialisation of the 1980s.

The historic county town was Alnwick; assizes were mainly held in Newcastle, with the county gaol in Morpeth. From the county council's formation in 1889 until 1981 Newcastle was the county town, being briefly the county town of two counties when the city became a part of the Tyne and Wear metropolitan county in 1974.

Northumberland remains largely rural, and is the least densely populated county in England. In recent years, the county has had considerable growth in tourism. Visitors are attracted both to its scenic beauty and to its historical sites.

== Geography ==
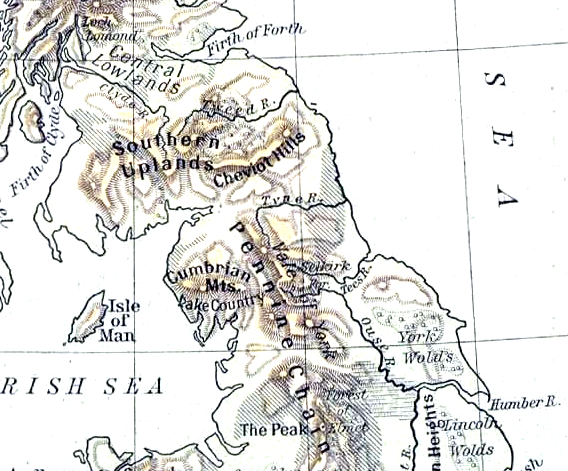
Physical geography of Northumberland and surrounding areas

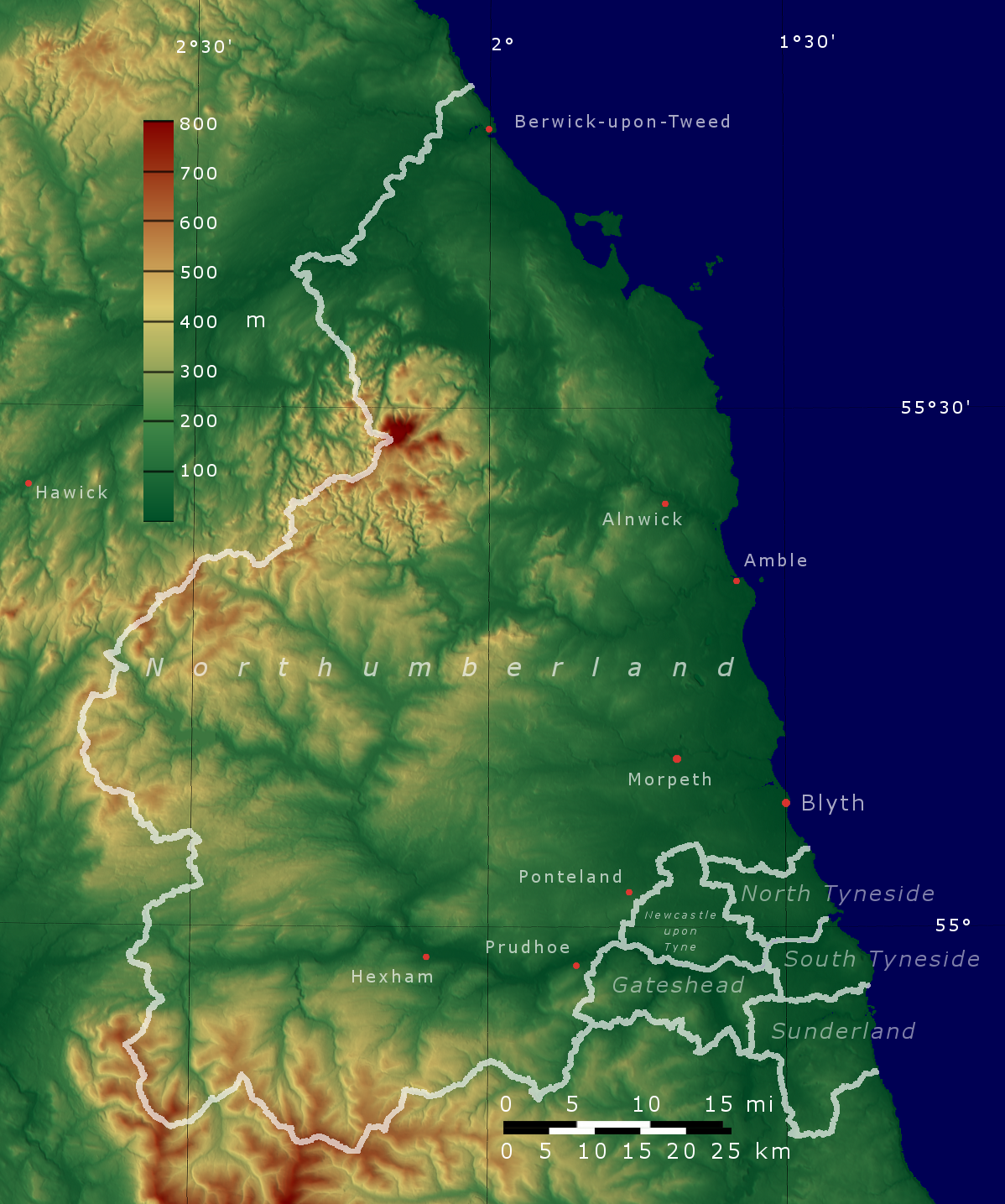

Northumberland has a diverse physical geography. It is low and flat near the North Sea coast and increasingly mountainous towards the northwest. Being in the far north of England, above 55° latitude, and having many areas of high land, Northumberland is one of the coldest areas of the country. But as the county lies on the east coast, it has relatively low rainfall, with the highest amounts falling on the high land in the west.

About a quarter of the county forms the Northumberland National Park, an area of outstanding landscape that has largely been protected from development and agriculture. The park stretches south from the Scottish border and includes Hadrian's Wall. Most of the park is over 240 metres (790 feet) above sea level. The Northumberland Coast is also a designated Area of Outstanding Natural Beauty (AONB). A small part of the North Pennines AONB is also in the county.

There is a variety of nature reserves in Northumberland including Holy Island National Nature Reserve and Farne Islands National Nature Reserve. Moreover, 50% of England's red squirrel population lives in the Kielder Water and Forest Park.

Natural England recognises the following natural regions, called national character areas, that lie wholly or partially within Northumberland:

- North Northumberland Coastal Plain
- South East Northumberland Coastal Plain
- Cheviot Fringe
- Cheviot Hills
- Northumberland Sandstone Hills
- Mid Northumberland
- Tyne Gap and Hadrian's Wall
- Border Moors and Forests
- Tyne and Wear Lowlands

=== Geology ===
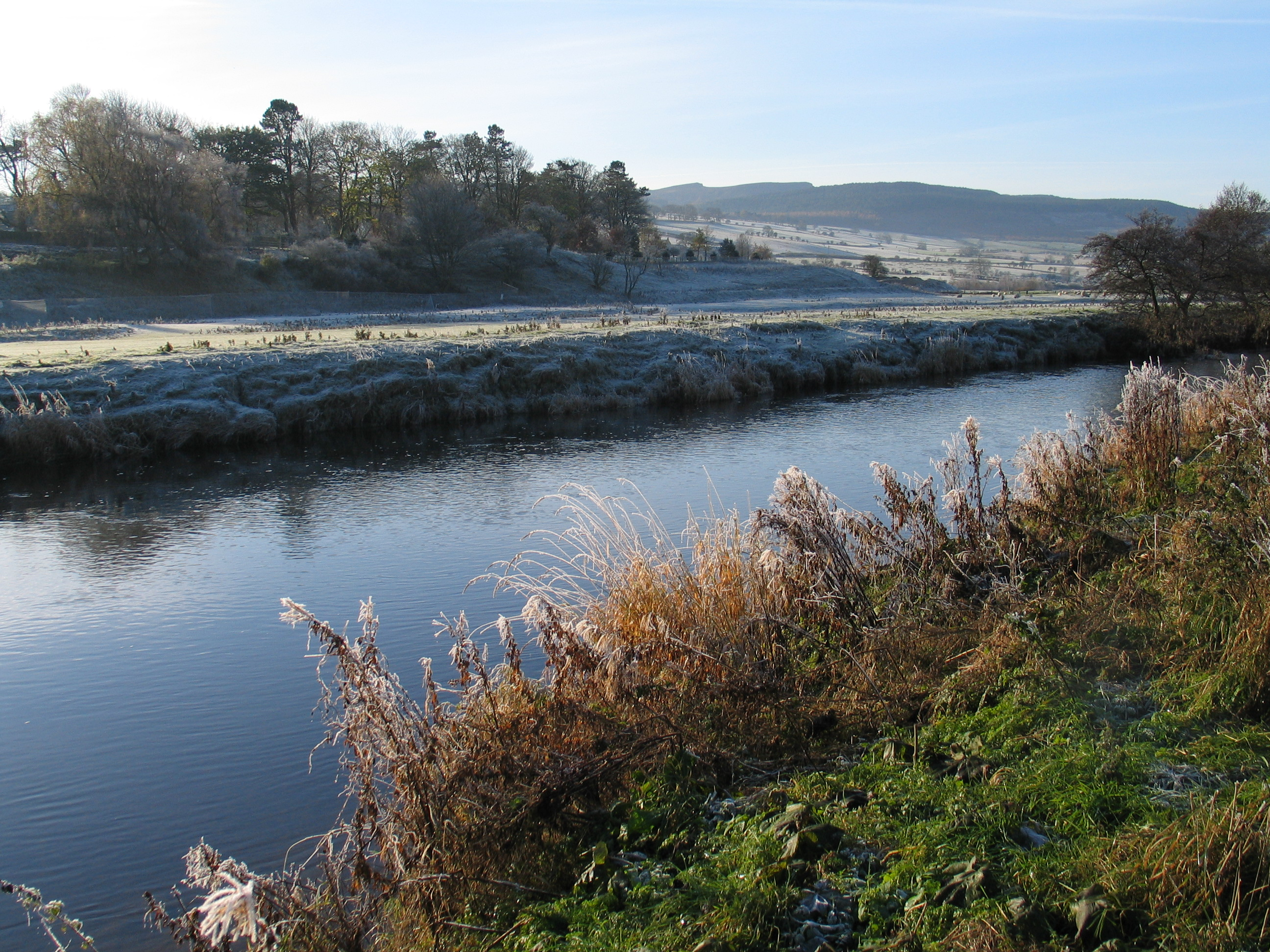
River Coquet

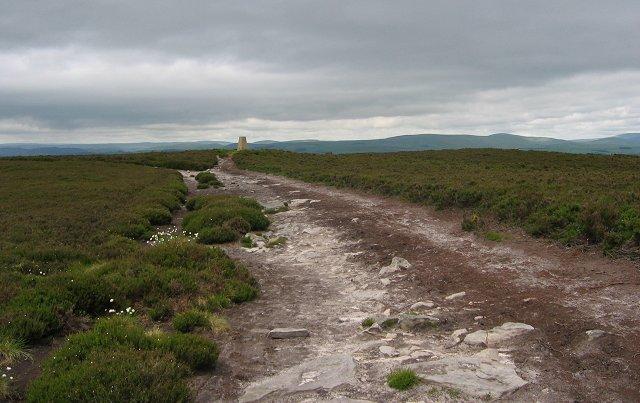
Long Crag summit

The Cheviot Hills, in the northwest of the county, consist mainly of resistant Devonian granite and andesite lava. A second area of igneous rock underlies the Whin Sill (on which Hadrian's Wall runs), an intrusion of Carboniferous dolerite. Both ridges support a rather bare moorland landscape. Either side of the Whin Sill the county lies on Carboniferous Limestone, giving some areas of karst landscape. Lying off the coast of Northumberland are the Farne Islands, another dolerite outcrop, famous for their bird life.

The Northumberland Coalfield extends across the southeast corner of the county, from the River Tyne as far north as Shilbottle. There were smaller-scale workings for coal within the Tyne Limestone Formation as far north as Scremerston. The term 'sea coal' likely originated from chunks of coal, found washed up on beaches, that wave action had broken from coastal outcroppings.

=== Green belt ===
Northumberland's green belt is in the south of the county, surrounding Cramlington and other communities along the county border, to afford a protection from the Tyneside conurbation. The belt continues west along the border, past Darras Hall, and on to Hexham, stopping before Haydon Bridge. Its border there is shared with the North Pennines AONB. There are also some separated belt areas, for example to the east of Morpeth. The green belt was first drawn up in the 1950s.

== Governance ==
=== Local government ===
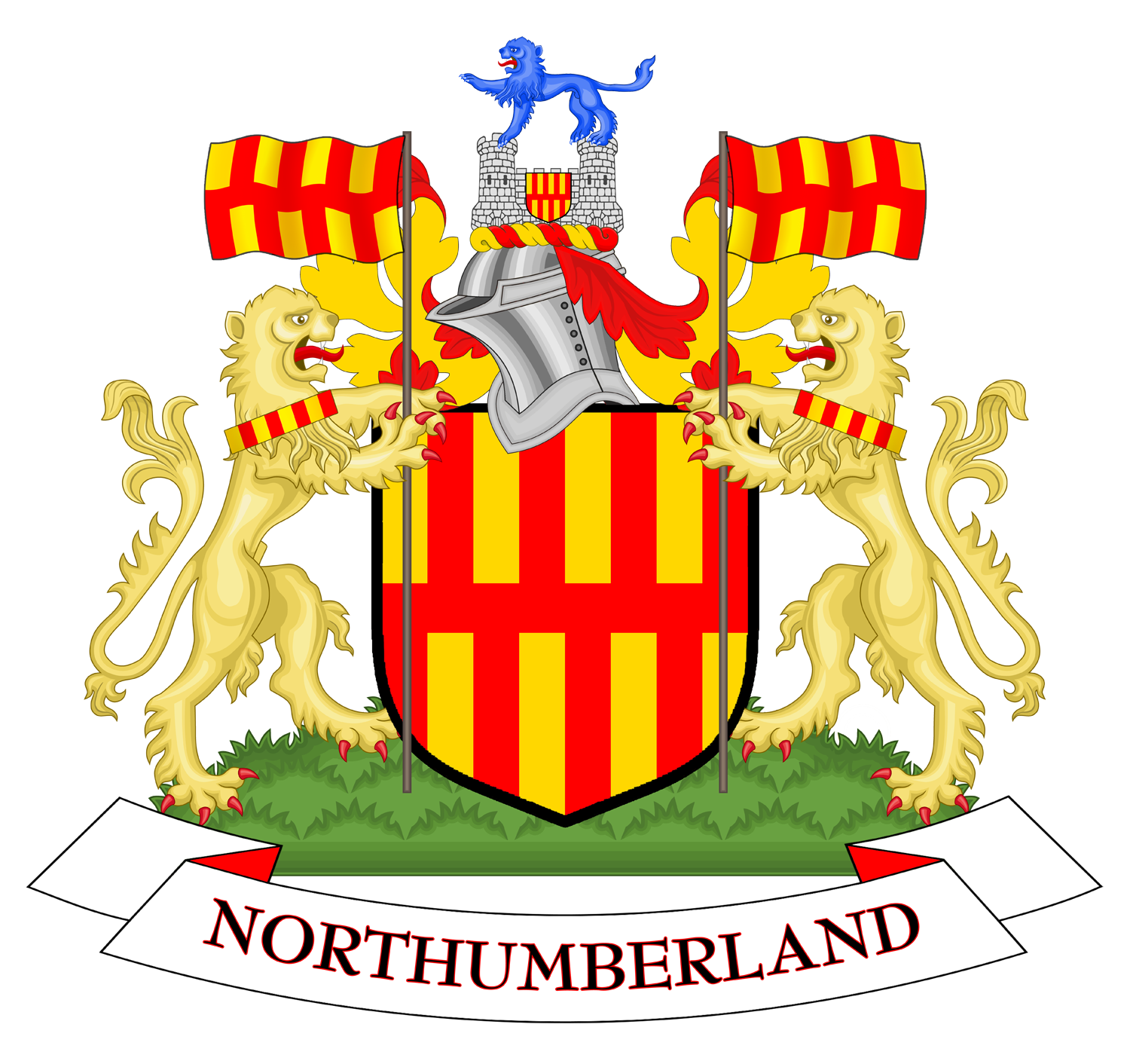
The coat of arms of Northumberland County Council

Since 2009, Northumberland has been a unitary authority area governed by Northumberland County Council. The council undertakes all local government functions, having the powers and responsibilities of a non-metropolitan county council and non-metropolitan district council. It meets at County Hall, Morpeth and consists of 69 county councillors. It has been under no overall control since 2021, a position maintained at the 2025 Northumberland County Council election, with the Conservative Party forming a minority administration.

==== History ====
The Local Government Act 1888, which established county councils, constituted Northumberland as an administrative county. Although the act considered Newcastle-upon-Tyne to be situated within Northumberland, it was designated a county borough and so maintained its independent local government. Nevertheless, Northumberland County Council met at the Moot Hall within the city and the building and its precincts were within the administrative county. Tynemouth also became a county borough, in 1904.

On 1 April 1974, under the Local Government Act 1972, Northumberland was re-constituted as a non-metropolitan county with six districts: Blyth Valley, Wansbeck, Castle Morpeth, Tynedale, Alnwick and Berwick-upon-Tweed. The provision of local government services was divided between the county council and the six district councils. At the same time, the new county of Tyne and Wear was created from north-east County Durham and south-east Northumberland, including Newcastle-upon-Tyne and Tynemouth. The new Northumberland County Council continued to meet in Newcastle until 1981, when it moved to new premises at County Hall, Morpeth.

In 2009, Northumberland was re-constituted as a unitary authority area by abolishing its six districts and their councils and making Northumberland County Council its sole principal authority.

=== Parliamentary constituencies ===
Northumberland contains all or part of four parliamentary constituencies. Blyth and Ashington and North Northumberland are entirely within the county. The constituency of Hexham is within Northumberland except for the ward of Callerton and Throckley, which is within Newcastle-upon-Tyne in Tyne and Wear. The northern part of Cramlington and Killingworth is within Northumberland, and the southern part within North Tyneside in Tyne and Wear.

All four constituencies have been held by members of the Labour Party since the 2024 United Kingdom general election.

== Demography ==
At the 2001 UK Census Northumberland registered a population of 307,190, estimated to be 309,237 in 2003, The 2011 UK Census gave a population of 316,028.

In 2001 there were 130,780 households, 10% of the population were retired, and one-third rented their homes. Northumberland has an ethnic minority population at 0.985% of the population, far lower compared to the average of 9.1% for England as a whole. In the 2001 UK Census, 81% of the population reported their religion as Christianity, 0.8% as "other religion", and 12% as having no religion.

Being primarily rural with significant areas of upland, the population density of Northumberland is only 66 persons per square kilometre, making it one of the least densely populated districts in England.

== Economy ==
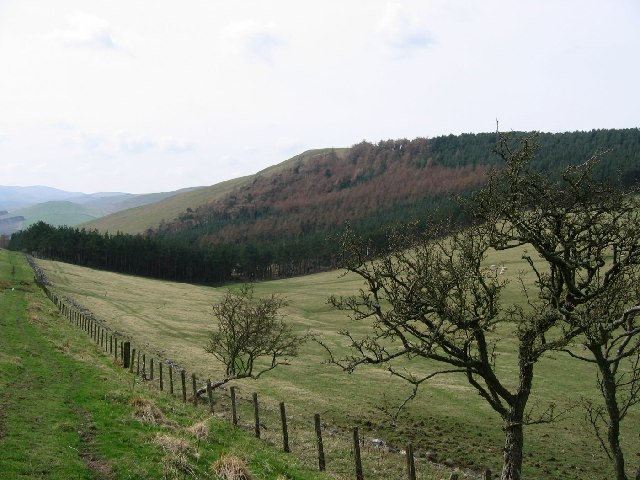
Housedon Hill

Northumberland's industry is dominated by some multinational corporations: Coca-Cola, MSD, GE and Drager all have significant facilities in the region.

Tourism is a major source of employment and income in Northumberland. In the early 2000s the county annually received 1.1 million British visitors and 50,000 foreign tourists, who spent a total of £162 million.

Coal mining in the county goes back to Tudor times. Coal mines continue to operate today; many of them are open-cast mines. Planning approval was given in January 2014 for an open-cast mine at Halton Lea Gate near Lambley.

A major employer in Northumberland is Hexham-based Egger (UK) Limited.

=== Pharmaceuticals, health care and biotechnology ===
Pharmaceutical, health care and emerging biotechnology companies form a very significant part of the county's economy. Many of these companies are part of the approximately 11,000-worker Northeast of England Process Industry Cluster (NEPIC) and include Aesica Pharmaceuticals, Arcinova, MSD, Piramal Healthcare, Procter & Gamble, Shire Plc (formerly SCM Pharma), Shasun Pharma Solutions, Specials Laboratory, and Thermo Fisher Scientific. The cluster also includes Cambridge Bioresearch, GlaxoSmithKline, Fujifilm Diosynth Biotech, Leica Bio, Data Trial, High Force Research, Non-Linear Dynamics, and Immuno Diagnostic Systems (IDS). The towns of Alnwick, Cramlington, Morpeth, Prudhoe all have significant pharmaceutical factories and laboratories.

Newcastle University and Northumbria University are the leading academic institutions nearby. The local industry includes commercial or academic activity in pre-clinical research and development, clinical research and development, pilot-scale manufacturing, full-scale active pharmaceutical ingredient/intermediate manufacturing, formulation, packaging, and distribution.

=== Media ===
Northumberland's mainstream media outlets are served from nearby Tyne and Wear, including radio stations and television channels (such as BBC Look North, BBC Radio Newcastle, ITV Tyne Tees and Hits Radio North East), along with the majority of daily newspapers covering the area (The Journal, Evening Chronicle). Newcastle's newspapers are widely read, alongside those of the wider county: the Northumberland Gazette, Morpeth Herald, Berwick Advertiser, Hexham Courant and the News Post Leader.

Lionheart Radio, a community radio station based in Alnwick, has been awarded a community broadcasting licence by Ofcom.

=== Businesses ===
Ashington has the former Alcan Lynemouth Aluminium Smelter, next to the Lynemouth Power Station. Hammerite and Cuprinol are made in Prudhoe by ICI Paints. A Procter & Gamble factory in Seaton Delaval makes Hugo Boss aftershave and Clairol and Nice 'n Easy hair dye at a site formerly owned by Shultons, who originated Old Spice and were bought by P&G in 1990. McQuay UK makes air conditioning systems on the Bassington Industrial Estate at the A1068/A1172 junction in Cramlington, and Avery Dennison UK make labels on the Nelson Industrial Estate off of the A192. Schweppes' Abbey Well mineral water is made by Coca-Cola in the east of Morpeth. The National Renewable Energy Centre (Narec) is at Blyth.

== Settlements ==
Major Settlements
(Civil parishes used for population counts where possible, otherwise the source closest to the locality's boundaries.)
The five largest settlements currently in Northumberland, as of the 2021 UK census. – Red.
A conurbation of suburban villages merged in a civil parish, which as of the 2021 UK census is larger than one of the above five towns (central settlement in the conurbation: Seaton Delaval). – Purple.
The five largest settlements which were historically in Northumberland, but now lie outside the modern county boundaries, as of the 2021 UK census. – Orange.
Town which has been earmarked for a large scale planned population increase. – Green.

=== Parishes ===
NOTE: New parishes have been added since 2001. These are missing from the list, see List of civil parishes in Northumberland.

Parishes of Northumberland
Name	Population (2001)	Former district/borough
Acklington	467	Alnwick
Acomb	1,184	Tynedale
Adderstone with Lucker	195	Berwick-upon-Tweed
Akeld	82	Berwick-upon-Tweed
Allendale	2,120	Tynedale
Alnham	99	Alnwick
Alnmouth	562	Alnwick
Alnwick	7,767	Alnwick
Alwinton	71	Alnwick
Amble	6,044	Alnwick
Ancroft	885	Berwick-upon-Tweed
Bamburgh	454	Berwick-upon-Tweed
Bardon Mill	364	Tynedale
Bavington	99	Tynedale
Beadnell	528	Berwick-upon-Tweed
Belford	1,055	Berwick-upon-Tweed
Belsay	436	Castle Morpeth
Bewick	69	Berwick-upon-Tweed
Biddlestone	88	Alnwick
Bowsden	157	Berwick-upon-Tweed
Branxton	121	Berwick-upon-Tweed
Brinkburn	200	Alnwick
Callaly	150	Alnwick
Capheaton	160	Castle Morpeth
Carham	347	Berwick-upon-Tweed
Cartington	97	Alnwick
Chatton	438	Berwick-upon-Tweed
Choppington	?	Castle Morpeth
Cornhill-on-Tweed	318	Berwick-upon-Tweed
Craster	342	Alnwick
Cresswell	237	Castle Morpeth
Denwick	266	Alnwick
Doddington	146	Berwick-upon-Tweed
Earle	89	Berwick-upon-Tweed
Easington	139	Berwick-upon-Tweed
East Chevington	3,192	Castle Morpeth
Edlingham	196	Alnwick
Eglingham	357	Alnwick
Ellingham	282	Berwick-upon-Tweed
Ellington and Linton	2,678	Castle Morpeth
Elsdon	205	Alnwick
Embleton	699	Alnwick
Ewart	72	Berwick-upon-Tweed
Felton	958	Alnwick
Ford	487	Berwick-upon-Tweed
Glanton	222	Alnwick
Harbottle	235	Alnwick
Hartburn	198	Castle Morpeth
Hauxley	220	Alnwick
Haydon	2,184	Tynedale
Hebron	679	Castle Morpeth
Heddon-on-the-Wall	1,518	Castle Morpeth
Hedgeley	322	Alnwick
Hepple	139	Alnwick
Hepscott	898	Castle Morpeth
Hesleyhurst	30	Alnwick
Hexham	11,829	Tynedale
Hollinghill	90	Alnwick
Holy Island	162	Berwick-upon-Tweed
Horncliffe	374	Berwick-upon-Tweed
Ilderton	94	Berwick-upon-Tweed
Ingram	148	Berwick-upon-Tweed
Kilham	131	Berwick-upon-Tweed
Kirknewton	108	Berwick-upon-Tweed
Kyloe	323	Berwick-upon-Tweed
Lesbury	871	Alnwick
Lilburn	106	Berwick-upon-Tweed
Longframlington	979	Alnwick
Longhirst	446	Castle Morpeth
Longhorsley	798	Castle Morpeth
Longhoughton	1,442	Alnwick
Lowick	559	Berwick-upon-Tweed
Lynemouth	1,832	Castle Morpeth
Matfen	495	Castle Morpeth
Meldon	162	Castle Morpeth
Middleton	136	Berwick-upon-Tweed
Milfield	243	Berwick-upon-Tweed
Mitford	431	Castle Morpeth
Morpeth	13,833	Castle Morpeth
Netherton	194	Alnwick
Netherwitton	272	Castle Morpeth
Newton-by-the-Sea	242	Alnwick
Newton on the Moor and Swarland	822	Alnwick
Norham	536	Berwick-upon-Tweed
North Sunderland	1,803	Berwick-upon-Tweed
Nunnykirk	138	Alnwick
Ord, Northumberland	1,365	Berwick-upon-Tweed
Pegswood	3,174	Castle Morpeth
Ponteland	10,871	Castle Morpeth
Prudhoe	11,500	Tynedale
Rennington	305	Alnwick
Roddam	77	Berwick-upon-Tweed
Rothbury	1,740	Alnwick
Rothley	136	Alnwick
Shilbottle	1,349	Alnwick
Shoreswood	163	Berwick-upon-Tweed
Snitter	114	Alnwick
Stamfordham	1,047	Castle Morpeth
Stannington	1,219	Castle Morpeth
Thirston	510	Castle Morpeth
Thropton	409	Alnwick
Togston	340	Alnwick
Tritlington and West Chevington	218	Castle Morpeth
Ulgham	365	Castle Morpeth
Wallington Demesne	361	Castle Morpeth
Warkworth	1,493	Alnwick
Whalton	427	Castle Morpeth
Whittingham	406	Alnwick
Whitton and Tosson	223	Alnwick
Widdrington	158	Castle Morpeth
Widdrington Station and Stobswood	2,386	Castle Morpeth
Wooler	1,857	Berwick-upon-Tweed

Although not on this list, the population of Cramlington is estimated at 39,000.

=== Historic areas ===
Some settlements that are part historic county of Northumberland now fall under the county of Tyne and Wear:

- Killingworth
- Longbenton
- Newcastle upon Tyne
- North Shields
- Tynemouth
- Wallsend
- Whitley Bay

== Sport ==
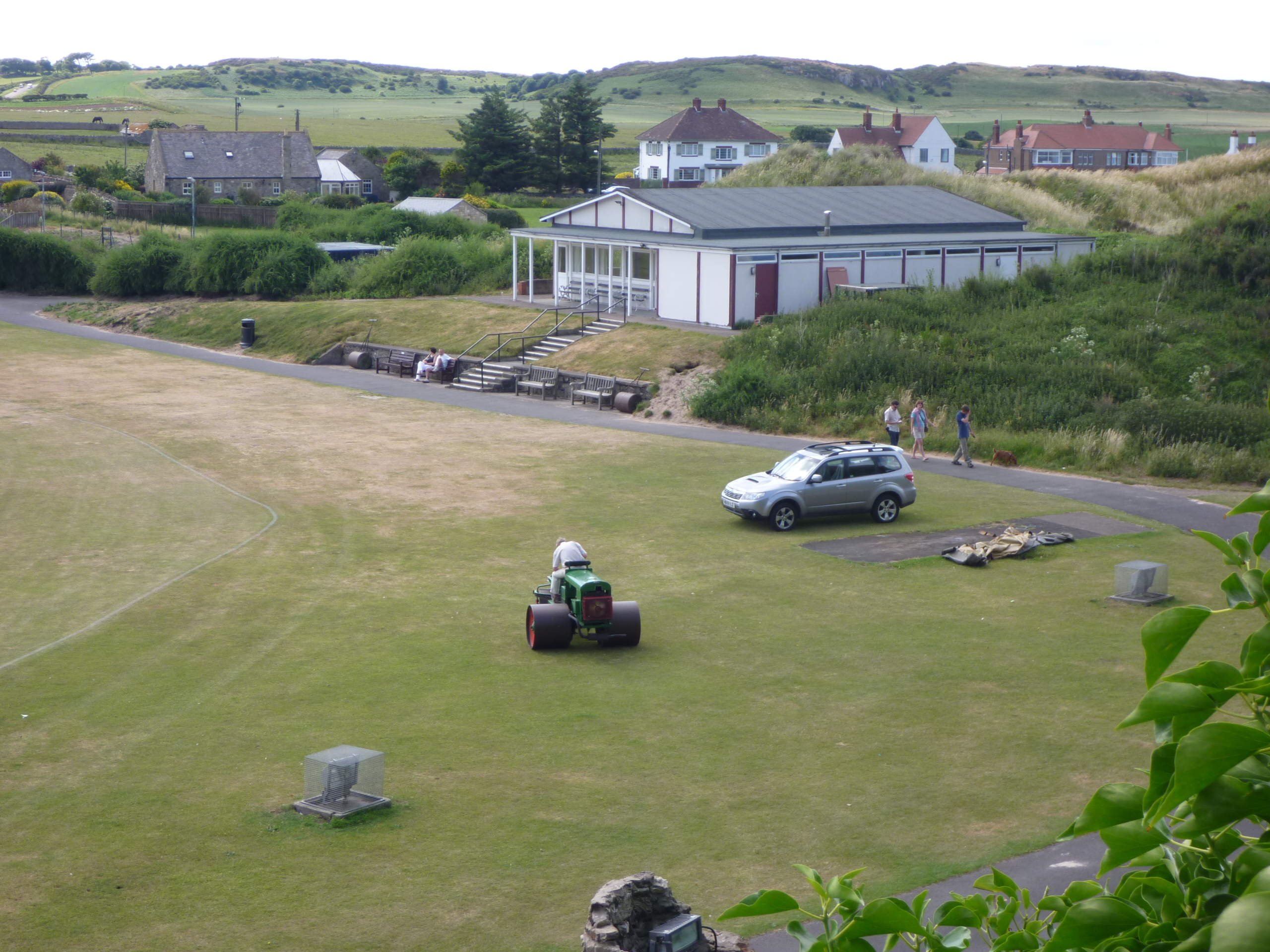
A cricket ground in Bamburgh

=== Football ===
A precursor of modern football is still seen in the region at some annual Shrove Tuesday games at Alnwick. In 1280 at Ulgham near Morpeth Northumberland, records show that Henry of Ellington was killed playing football when David Le Keu's knife went into Henry's belly and killed him. Organised football teams as we know today did not appear until the 1870s. Newcastle United Football Club was formed in 1892 by uniting Newcastle West End FC with Newcastle East End.

Newcastle United were first division champions three times in the early 20th century, reaching the FA Cup Final three times before winning it at the fourth attempt in 1910. Today, top quality professional football remains in Northumberland. Since the 2017 – 18 season, Newcastle United is a Premier League team. St James' Park in Newcastle is a first class football venue, often used for international games at all levels. Blyth Spartans A.F.C. have had success and public attention through Football Association Cup runs.

==== Notable associated footballers ====
There are many notable footballers from the county, pre Second World War and immediate post war greats were George Camsell and Hughie Gallacher, these were described in the "Clown Prince of Football" by Len Shackleton. The author played for Newcastle United and Northumberland County Cricket Club. Shackleton's book was controversial when it was first published because chapter 9, named "The Average Director's Knowledge of Football", was produced as a blank page. Notable players after the Second World War included Joe Harvey, Jackie Milburn, Brian Clough and Newcastle's Bobby Moncur who led his team to win the Inter City Fairs Cup in 1969.

Two of Jackie Milburn's nephews from Ashington, Bobby Charlton and Jackie Charlton are perhaps the two most significant players for England. Bobby joined Manchester United and Jackie Leeds United both contributing much to the success and history of their respective clubs. They both became permanent fixtures in Alf Ramsey's 1966 England World Cup winning team. Malcolm Macdonald was a successful Newcastle player of the 1970s. Great national players who played at Northumberland clubs in the 1980s and 1990s include Peter Beardsley, Paul Gascoigne, Chris Waddle and Alan Shearer. Shearer remains the highest scoring player in Premier League history with 260 goals in 441 appearances.

=== Horseracing ===
Early races were held at Newcastle's Killingworth Moor from 1632 before moving to the Town Moor. The 'Pitmen's Derby' or Northumberland Plate was held from 1833 and moved to Gosforth in 1882. Modern day horse racing still takes place at Newcastle Racecourse.

=== Golf ===
Golf is a Scottish import to many countries, but it is said to have been played in this region by St Cuthbert on the dunes of the Northumberland coast. The oldest club in Northumberland was at Alnmouth, founded in 1869, it is the fourth oldest in the country and is now Alnmouth Village Club; it is a 9 hole links course.

There is one old links course at Goswick. It is a James Braid design which is widely acknowledged as a classic Northumberland links course; so much so, that the Royal and Ancient Golf Club (R&A) chose Goswick as a regional qualifier for the Open Championship for five years from 2008.

During the English Civil War of 1642–1651, King Charles played 'Goff' in the Shield Fields suburb of Pandon during his imprisonment in the town.

Today inland golf courses are abundant in the county,

The county has a professional golfer who has played in many professional golf tour events: Kenny Ferrie from Ashington, who has won events on the prestigious European Tour.

=== Other ===
The annual Great North Run, one of the best known half marathons in which thousands of participants run from Newcastle to South Shields. In 2013 the 33rd Great North Run had 56,000 participants most of whom were raising money for charity.

== Places of interest ==
Key
	Abbey/Priory/Cathedral
Accessible open space	Accessible open space
	Amusement/Theme Park
	Castle
Country Park	Country Park
	English Heritage
	Forestry Commission
Heritage railway	Heritage railway
Historic house	Historic House
Places of Worship	Places of Worship
Museum (free) Museum	Museum (free/not free)
National Trust	National Trust
	Theatre
	Zoo

Fortifications

- Berwick town walls
- Castles
  - Alnwick
  - Aydon, Corbridge
  - Bamburgh
  - Chipchase Castle
  - Lindisfarne Castle and priory, Holy Island of Lindisfarne
  - Morpeth Castle and Carlisle Park, Morpeth
  - Norham
  - Prudhoe
  - Twizel
  - Warkworth
- Cilurnum Roman Fort
- Coria Roman Fort, Corbridge
- Vindolanda and Vercovicium Roman Forts

Halls, museums and other buildings

- Cherryburn house
- Chesters House
- Cragside, Rothbury
- Howick Hall, with gardens and arboretum
- Kirkley with Northumberland College Zoo
- Northumberlandia, Cramlington
- Royal Border Bridge
- Seaton Delaval
- Slaley Hall
- Woodhorn Museum, Ashington

Parks and forests

- Druridge Bay Country Park, Bedlington
- Kielder Forest and Kielder Water
- Northumberland National Park
- Plessey Woods Country Park, Bedlington

=== Gallery ===
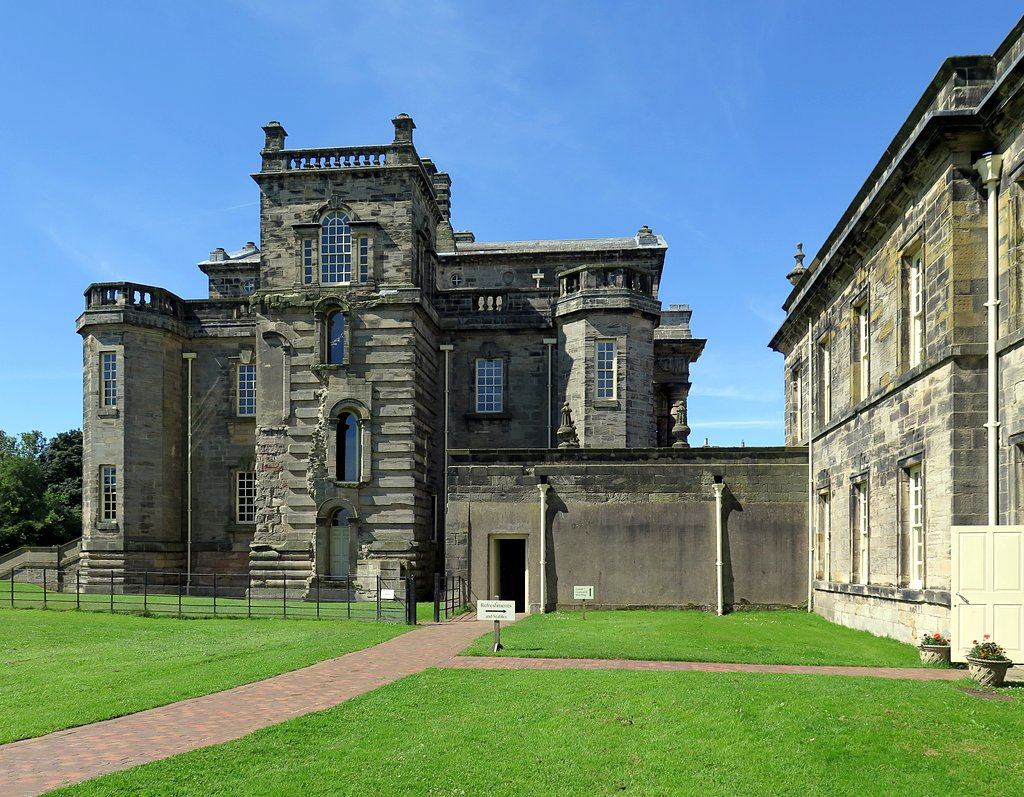
Seaton Delaval Hall

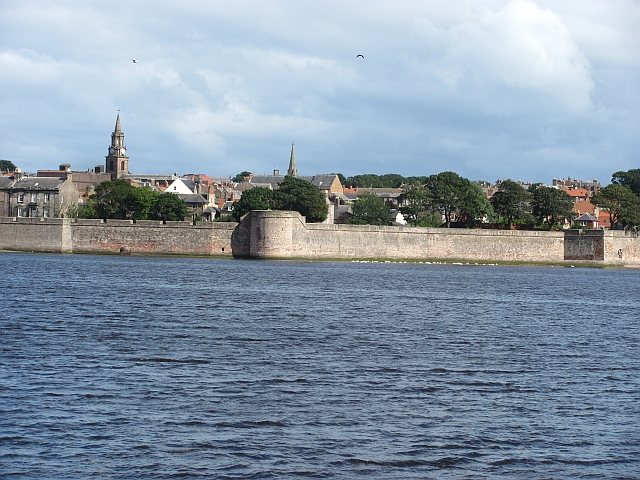
Berwick town walls

Lindisfarne Castle

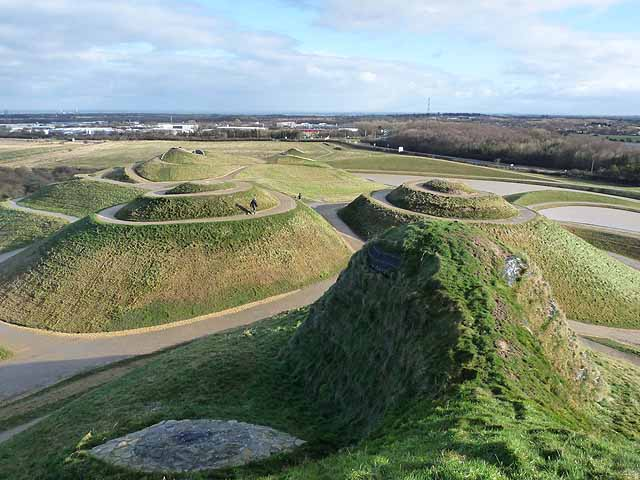
Northumberlandia

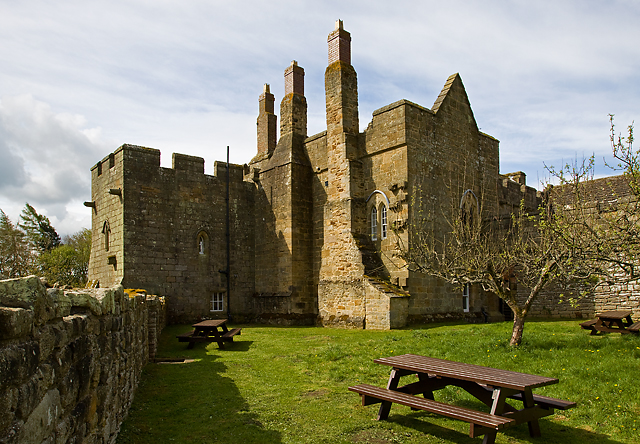
Aydon Castle

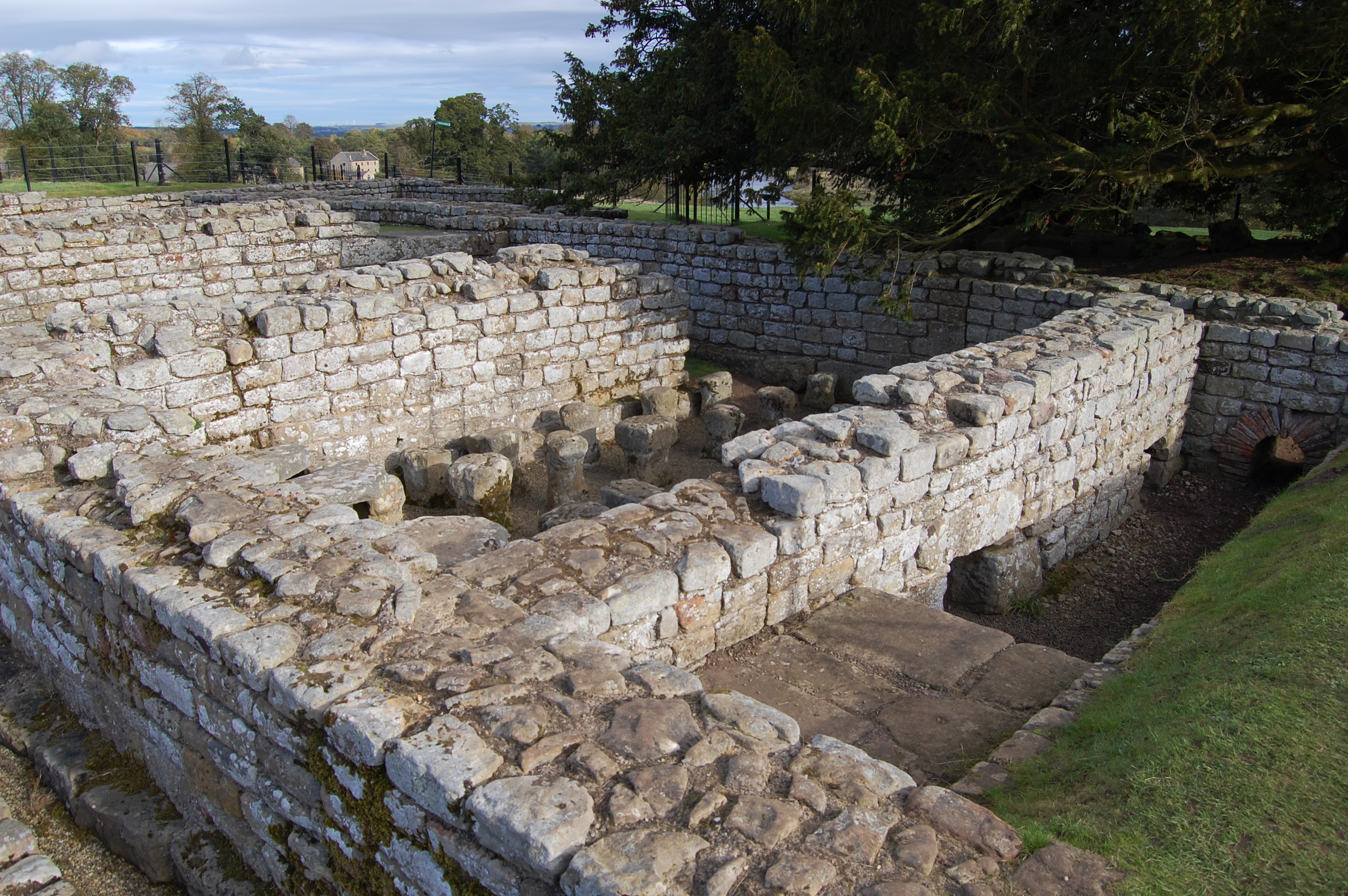
Cilurnum commander's house

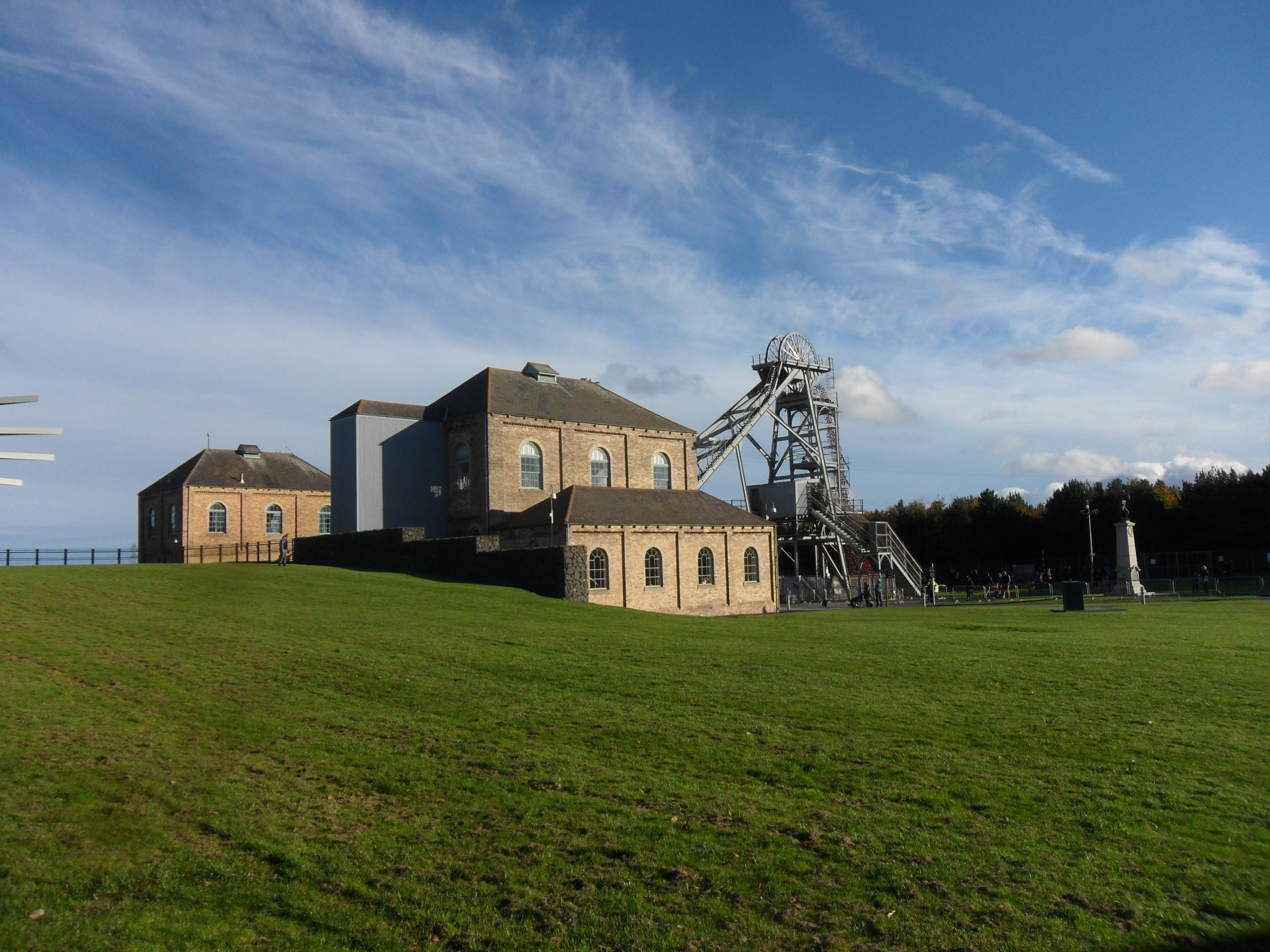
Woodhorn (museum)

== Education ==
Northumberland has a completely comprehensive education system, with 15 state schools, two academies and one independent school. Like Bedfordshire, it embraced the comprehensive ideal with the three-tier system of lower/middle/upper schools with large school year sizes (often around 300). This eliminated choice of school in most areas: instead of having two secondary schools in one town, one school became a middle school and another became an upper school. A programme introduced in 2006 known as Putting the Learner First has eliminated this structure in the former areas of Blyth Valley and Wansbeck, where two-tier education has been introduced. Although the two processes are not officially connected, the introduction of two tiers has coincided with the move to build academy schools in Blyth, with Bede Academy and in Ashington at Hirst. One response to these changes has been the decision of Ponteland High School to apply for Trust status.

Cramlington Learning Village has almost 400 pupils in each school year, making it one of the largest schools in England. The Blyth Academy in southeast Northumberland can hold 1,500 students throughout the building. Astley Community High School in Seaton Delaval, which accepts students from Seaton Delaval, Seaton Sluice and Blyth, has been the subject of controversial remarks from politicians claiming it would no longer be viable once Bede Academy opened in Blyth, a claim strongly disputed by the headteacher.

The county of Northumberland is served by one Catholic high school, St Benet Biscop Catholic Academy in Bedlington, which is attended by students from all over the area. Students from Northumberland also attend independent schools such as the Royal Grammar School in Newcastle.

== Culture ==
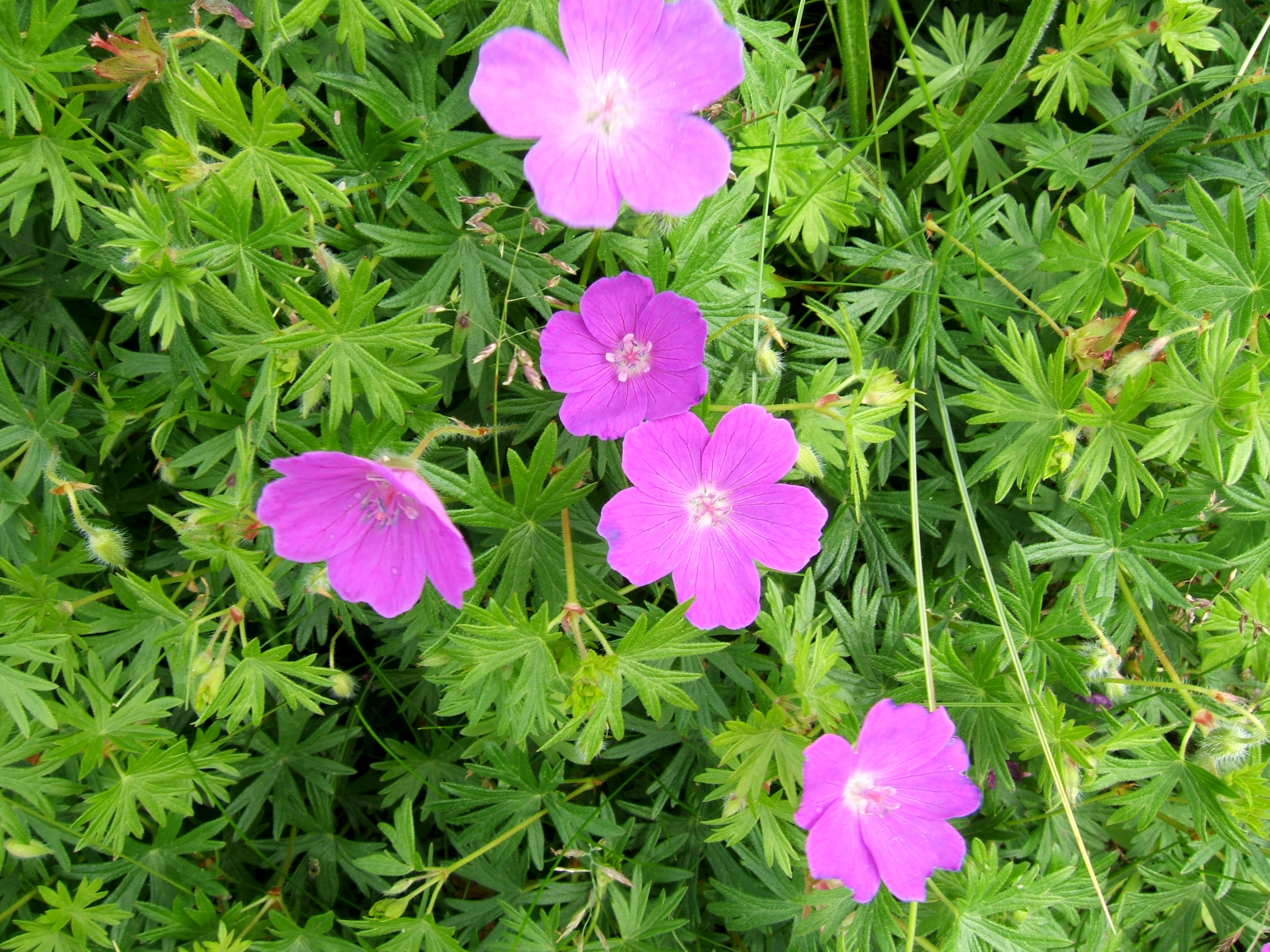
Bloody crane's-bill at Hauxley on the Northumberland coast

Northumberland has traditions not found elsewhere in England. These include the rapper sword dance, the clog dance and the Northumbrian smallpipe. Northumberland also has its own tartan or check, sometimes referred to in Scotland as the Shepherd's Tartan. Traditional Northumbrian music has more similarity to Lowland Scottish and Irish music than it does to that of other parts of England, reflecting the strong historical links between Northumbria and the Lowlands of Scotland, and the large Irish population on Tyneside.

The border ballads of the region have been famous since late mediaeval times. Thomas Percy, whose celebrated Reliques of Ancient English Poetry appeared in 1765, states that most of the minstrels who sang the border ballads in London and elsewhere in the 15th and 16th centuries belonged to the North. The activities of Sir Walter Scott and others in the 19th century gave the ballads an even wider popularity. William Morris considered them to be the greatest poems in the language, while Algernon Charles Swinburne knew virtually all of them by heart.

One of the best-known is the stirring "Chevy Chase", which tells of the Earl of Northumberland's vow to hunt for three days across the Border "maugre the doughty Douglas". Of it, the Elizabethan courtier, soldier and poet Sir Philip Sidney famously said, "I never heard the old song of Percy and Douglas that I found not my heart moved more than with a trumpet". Ben Jonson said that he would give all his works to have written "Chevy Chase".

Overall the culture of Northumberland, as with the North East of England in general, may have more in common with Scottish Lowland culture than with that of Southern England. Both regions have their cultural origins in the old Anglian Kingdom of Northumbria, a fact borne out by the linguistic links between the two regions. These include many Old English words not found in other forms of Modern English, such as bairn for child (see Scots language and Northumbrian dialect).

The lands just north or south of the border have long shared certain aspects of history and heritage; it is thus thought by some that the Anglo-Scottish border is largely political rather than cultural.

Attempts to raise the level of awareness of Northumberland culture have also started, with the formation of a Northumbrian Language Society to preserve the unique dialects (Pitmatic and other Northumbrian dialects) of this region, as well as to promote home-grown talent.

Northumberland's county flower is the bloody crane's-bill (Geranium sanguineum) and its affiliated Royal Navy ship is its namesake, HMS Northumberland.

=== Flag ===
The flag of the historic county of Northumberland

The historic county of Northumberland has its own flag, which is a banner of the arms of Northumberland County Council. The shield of arms is in turn based on the arms medieval heralds had attributed to the Kingdom of Bernicia (which the first County Council used until it was granted its own arms). The Bernician arms were fictional but inspired by Bede's brief description of a flag used on the tomb of St Oswald in the 7th century.

The current arms were granted to the county council in 1951, and adopted as the flag of Northumberland in 1995.

== Notable people ==
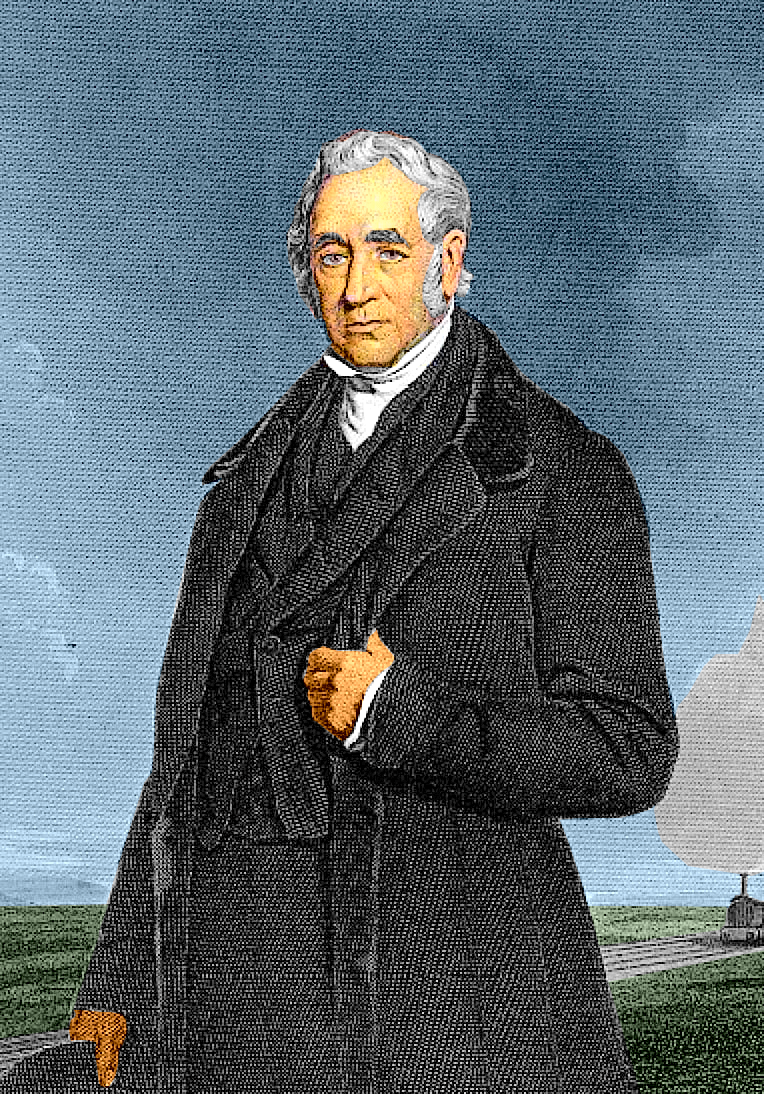
Railway engineer George Stephenson was born in Northumberland in 1781.

=== Born in Northumberland ===
Ashington was the birthplace of three famous footballers: Bobby and Jack Charlton, born in 1937 and 1935 respectively, and Jackie Milburn, born in 1924. In 1978 the international cricketer Steve Harmison was born in the same town.

Mickley was the birthplace of Thomas Bewick, an artist, wood engraver and naturalist born in 1753, and Bob Stokoe, a footballer and F.A. Cup-winning manager (with Sunderland in 1973) born in 1930.

Other notable births include:

- Thomas Addison, the physician who first described Addison's Disease, born at Longbenton in 1793
- George Airy, Astronomer Royal and geophysicist, born at Alnwick in 1802
- Alexander Armstrong, comedy actor and presenter, born at Rothbury in 1970
- Mary Bell, murderer, born at Corbridge in 1957
- Allan Boardman (1937–2018), British physicist
- Lancelot 'Capability' Brown, landscape and garden designer, born at Kirkharle in 1715
- Basil Bunting, poet, born at Scotswood-on-Tyne in 1900
- Eric Burdon, singer and leader of The Animals and War, born at Walker-on-Tyne in 1941
- Josephine Butler, social reformer, born at Milfield in 1828
- Cuthbert Collingwood, 1st Baron Collingwood, naval commander at the Battle of Trafalgar, born at Newcastle upon Tyne in 1748
- Grace Darling, sea-rescue heroine, born at Bamburgh in 1815
- Pete Doherty, musician, born at Hexham in 1979
- Bryan Donkin, engineer and industrialist, born at Sandhoe in 1768
- Wilfrid Wilson Gibson, poet, born at Hexham in 1878
- Daniel Gooch, engineer and politician, born at Bedlington in 1816
- Alistair Graham (1942–), trade unionist and civil servant
- Tom Graveney, former England cricketer and President of the Marylebone Cricket Club 2004/5, born in Riding Mill in 1927.
- Robson Green, actor and singer, born at Hexham in 1964
- Charles Grey, 2nd Earl Grey, British Prime Minister, born at the family seat of Howick Hall in 1764
- William Hewson, British physician, the "Father of Haematology", at Hexham, 14 November 1739
- Jean Heywood, actress, born at Blyth best known for Our Day Out and All Creatures Great and Small.
- Ray Kennedy: Footballer, Liverpool F.C.
- Marie Lebour (1876–1971), British marine biologist
- Robert Morrison (1782–1834), Protestant missionary and sinologist
- Ross Noble, stand-up comedian, born and raised in Cramlington in the 1970s and 1980s
- Matt Ridley, 5th Viscount Ridley, peer, science writer, and businessman
- John Rushworth (1793–1860), historian, born at Acklington Park, Warkworth
- George Stephenson, pioneering railway engineer, born at Wylam in 1781
- Trevor Steven, footballer born in Berwick-upon-Tweed in 1963
- Percival Stockdale, poet and slave-trade abolitionist, born 1736 in Branxton, Northumberland
- Hugh Trevor-Roper (1914–2003), Oxford historian, born at Glanton
- William Turner, ornithologist and botanist born at Morpeth in 1508
- Sid Waddell, sports commentator and children's television screenwriter, born at Alnwick in 1940
- Veronica Wedgwood (1910–1997), historian, usually published as C. V. Wedgwood
- Kevin Whately, actor, born in Humshaugh, near Hexham in 1951
- N. T. Wright, Anglican theologian and author, former Bishop of Durham, born in Morpeth in 1948
- Billy Younger (1940–2007), footballer

=== Linked with Northumberland ===
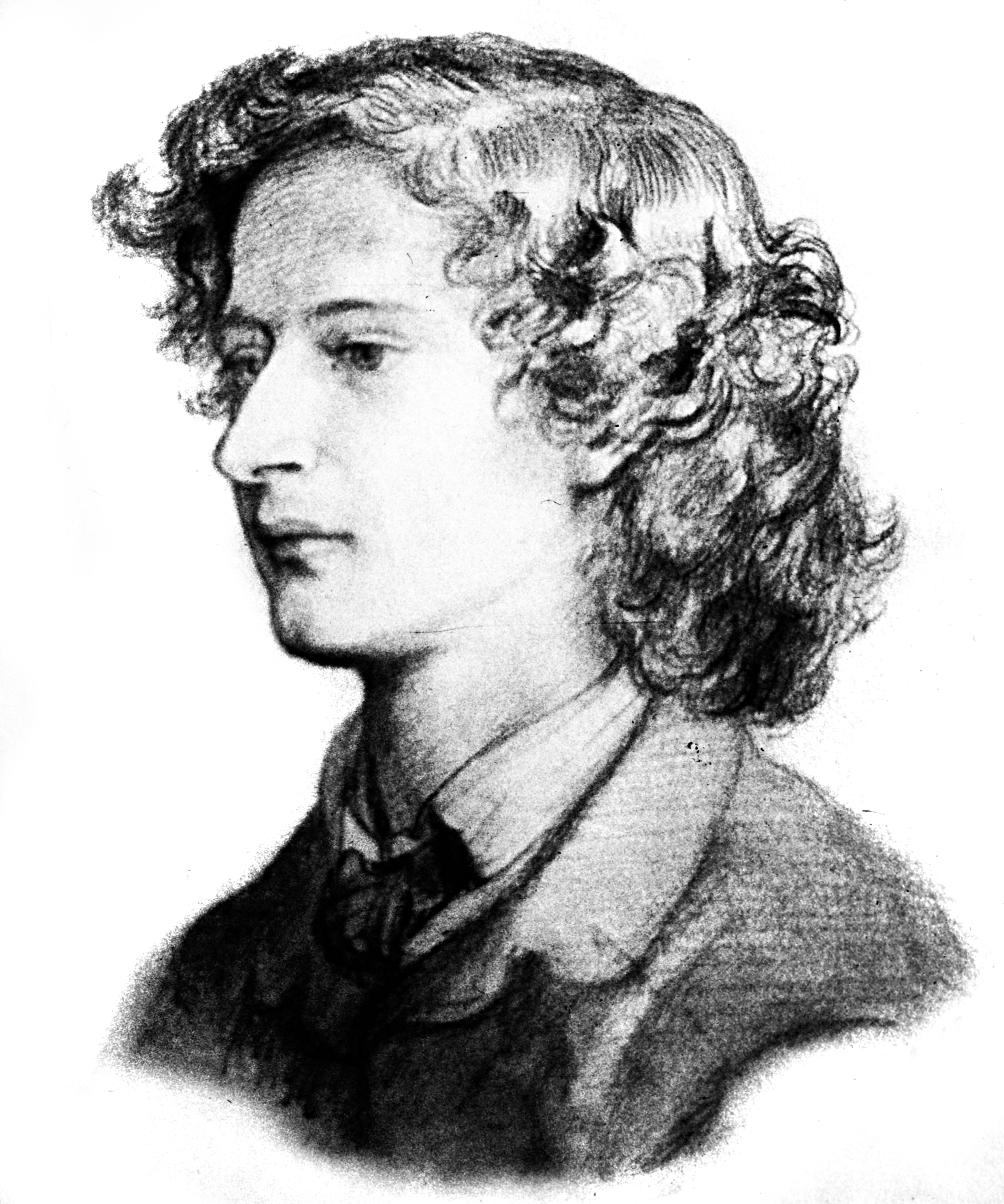
Algernon Charles Swinburne, the poet, was raised in Northumberland

- William Armstrong, engineer and inventor, born at Newcastle in 1810, built Cragside, one of the first houses powered by hydroelectric technology, near the town of Rothbury in Northumberland.
- Thomas Burt, one of the first working-class members of parliament and was secretary of the Northumberland Miners' Association in 1863
- Matthew Festing, 79th Grand Master, the Order of Malta.
- Kitty Fitzgerald (born 25 September 1946) is an Irish born writer living in Northumberland.
- Allan Holdsworth, guitarist, originated from Newcastle upon Tyne before moving to California.
- Mark Knopfler, guitarist and frontman of Dire Straits, was raised in his mother's hometown of Blyth, Northumberland.
- Harold Palmer (hermit), Christian hermit who lived at Shepherds Law for over fifty years until 2024
- Charles Algernon Parsons, inventor of the steam turbine while living in Wylam, Northumberland
- Henry 'Hotspur' Percy (1365–1403), borders warlord and rebel
- Billy Pigg, a 20th-century musician who was vice-President of the Northumbrian Pipers Society
- Alan Shearer footballer, lives in Ponteland.
- Gordon Sumner, better known by his stage name of Sting, a schoolteacher turned musician was born in Newcastle upon Tyne in 1951
- Algernon Charles Swinburne, a poet raised at Capheaton Hall
- Kathryn Tickell, a modern-day player of the Northumbrian smallpipes
- J. M. W. Turner, Thomas Girtin, and John Cotman all painted memorable pictures of Northumberland
- Jonny Wilkinson, English rugby player, currently lives in rural Northumberland.

== See also ==
- Duke of Northumberland
- List of Lord Lieutenants of Northumberland
- List of High Sheriffs of Northumberland
- Custos Rotulorum of Northumberland – List of Keepers of the Rolls
- Northumberland (UK Parliament constituency) – Historical list of MPs for the Northumberland constituency
- Kielder Forest Star Camp
- List of English and Welsh endowed schools (19th century)#Northumberland
- List of people from Northumberland
- List of parliamentary constituencies in Northumberland
- List of places of interest and tourist attractions in Northumberland
- Northumberland Street, Newcastle upon Tyne, Tyne and Wear
- Anglo-Scottish border

== Bibliography ==
- Sharp, Thomas (1937). Northumberland and Durham – a Shell Guide. B.T. Batsford.
- Tomlinson, W.W. (1968) [1888]. Comprehensive guide to the county of Northumberland. Trowbridge: Redwood.
- Thompson, Barbara; Norderhaug, Jennifer (2006). Walking the Northumberland Dales: Hadrian's Wall Country. Sigma Press. ISBN 1-85058-838-4.
