= Togston =

Coordinates: 55.307299°N 1.6144353°W

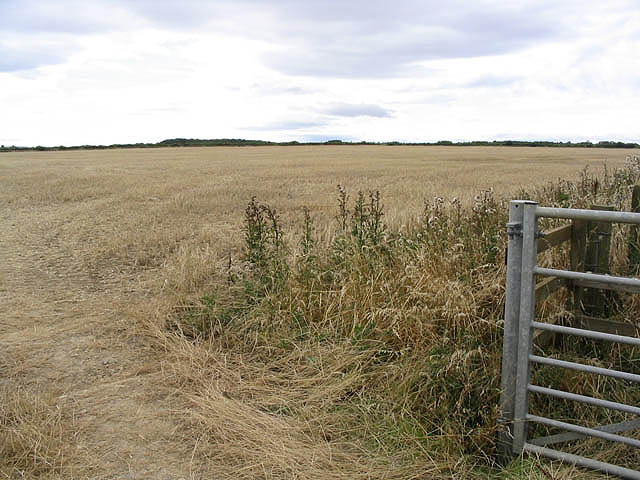

- Location within Northumberland
- Area: 4.346 km^{2} (1.678 sq mi)
- Population: 315 (2011 census)
  - Density: 72/km^{2} (190/sq mi)
- Civil parish: Togston
- Unitary authority: Northumberland
- Ceremonial county: Northumberland
- Region: North East
- Country: England
- Sovereign state: United Kingdom
- Police: Northumbria
- Fire: Northumberland
- Ambulance: North East
- Website: https://northumberlandparishes.uk/togston

Togston is a settlement and civil parish about 10 miles from Morpeth, in the county of Northumberland, England. The parish includes the hamlet of North Togston. In 2011 the parish had a population of 315. The parish borders Acklington, Amble By the Sea, East Chevington and Hauxley.

== Features ==
There are 7 listed buildings in Togston.

== History ==
The name "Togston" means 'Tocg's valley'. Togston was formerly a township in the parish of Warkworth, in 1866 Togston became a civil parish in its own right.
