= Lilburn, Northumberland =

Village in Northumberland, England

Coordinates: 55.514°N 1.958°W

Lilburn
- Location within Northumberland
- Population: 138 (2011 census)
- OS grid reference: NU027245
- Unitary authority: Northumberland
- Ceremonial county: Northumberland
- Region: North East
- Country: England
- Sovereign state: United Kingdom
- Post town: ALNWICK
- Postcode district: NE66
- Dialling code: 01668
- Police: Northumbria
- Fire: Northumberland
- Ambulance: North East
- UK Parliament: Berwick-upon-Tweed

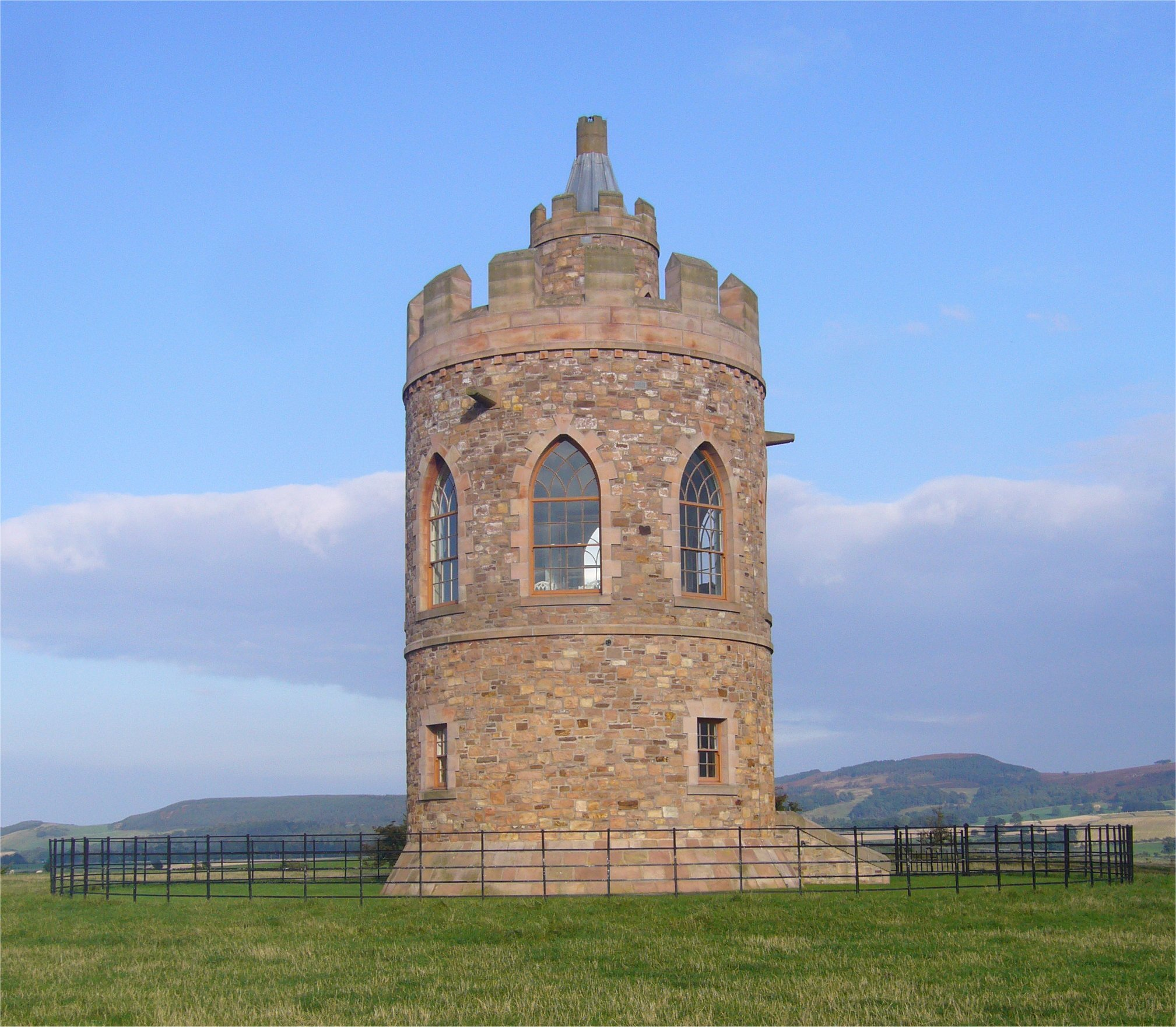
The Hurlestone Tower, at Lilburn, Northumberland.

Lilburn is a small village in Northumberland, England. It is located on the edge of the Cheviots. The local farming estate is centred on Lilburn Tower.

The area is noted for its large number of earthworks and remains of prehistoric settlements.

== Governance ==
Lilburn is in the parliamentary constituency of Berwick-upon-Tweed.
