= Glanton =

Village in Northumberland, England

Coordinates: 55.424°N 1.883°W

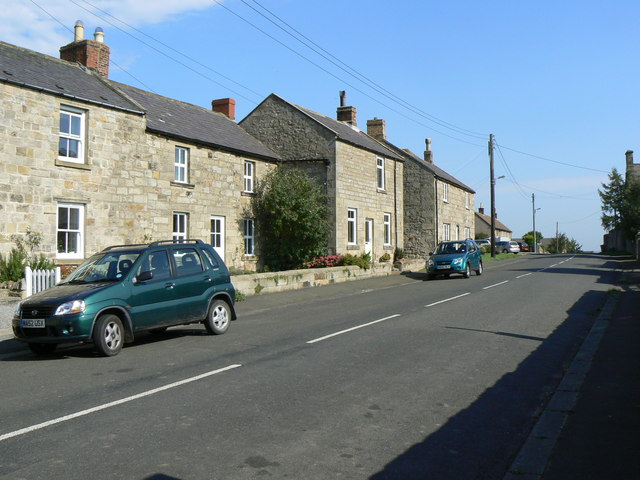
- Glanton

- Location within Northumberland
- Population: 239 (2011 census)
- OS grid reference: NU075145
- Unitary authority: Northumberland
- Ceremonial county: Northumberland
- Region: North East
- Country: England
- Sovereign state: United Kingdom
- Post town: ALNWICK
- Postcode district: NE66
- Dialling code: 01665
- Police: Northumbria
- Fire: Northumberland
- Ambulance: North East
- UK Parliament: North Northumberland

Glanton is a small rural village, in the county of Northumberland, England. Agriculture dominates the surrounding area.

== Governance ==
Glanton is in the parliamentary constituency of Berwick-upon-Tweed. As a district, it is a part of the unitary authority of Northumberland.

== Landmarks ==
The Devil's Causeway passes the eastern edge of the village. The causeway was a Roman road which started at Port Gate on Hadrian's Wall, north of Corbridge, and extended 55 miles (89 km) northwards across Northumberland to the mouth of the River Tweed at Berwick-upon-Tweed.

== Notable people ==
- Hugh Trevor-Roper, Lord Dacre of Glanton, historian
