= Denwick =

Coordinates: 55.422128°N 1.677818°W

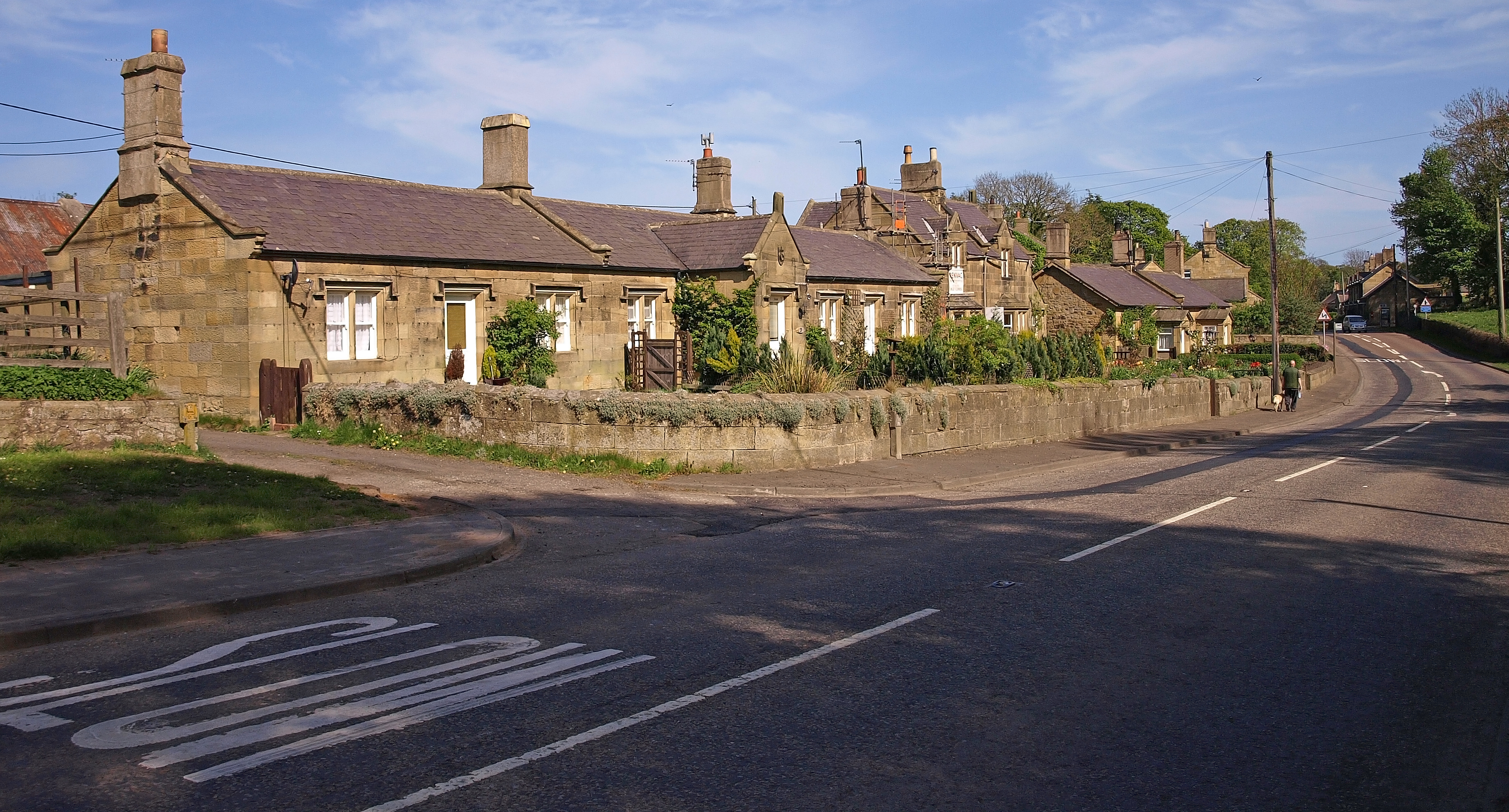

- Location within Northumberland
- Population: 267 (2011 census)
- OS grid reference: NU2049114294
- Unitary authority: Northumberland
- Ceremonial county: Northumberland
- Region: North East
- Country: England
- Sovereign state: United Kingdom
- Post town: ALNWICK
- Postcode district: NE66
- Dialling code: 01665
- Police: Northumbria
- Fire: Northumberland
- Ambulance: North East
- UK Parliament: North Northumberland

Denwick is a small village and civil parish in Northumberland, located about 1.4 miles (2 km) north-east of Alnwick.

== History ==
During a time of increased prosperity for Northumberland in the 19th century a whole village was planned and built in Denwick as part of the Duke of Northumberland's estate, although there is evidence of settlements in this area since the Bronze Age.

== Geography ==
The civil parish is divided into two parts. Denwick village is located within the main part, north of the Aln, along with the majority of Hulne Park. The detached southern part of the parish extends as far south as Newton on the Moor.

Denwick Burn, a tributary of the River Aln, flows past the village to the north.

== Demography ==
Parish population
1891	1901	1911	1921	1931	1951	1961	2001
682	662	713	668	593	441	451	266

== Landmarks ==
Several listed buildings are located within the civil parish including Denwick Bridge, Denwick House, Heiferlaw Tower, Brizlee Tower and Hulne Priory. A number of houses within the village are also grade II listed.

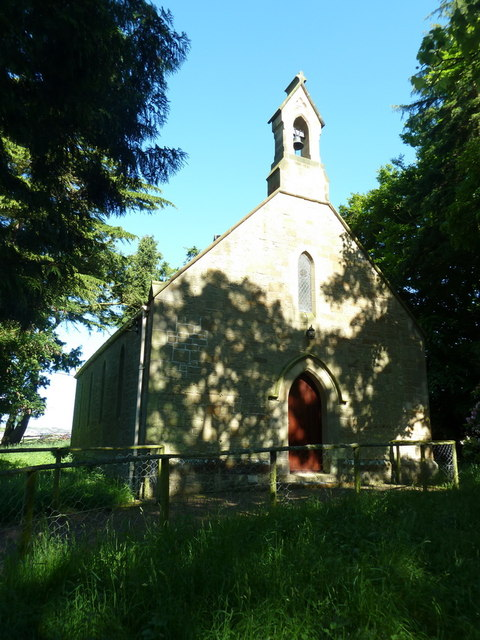
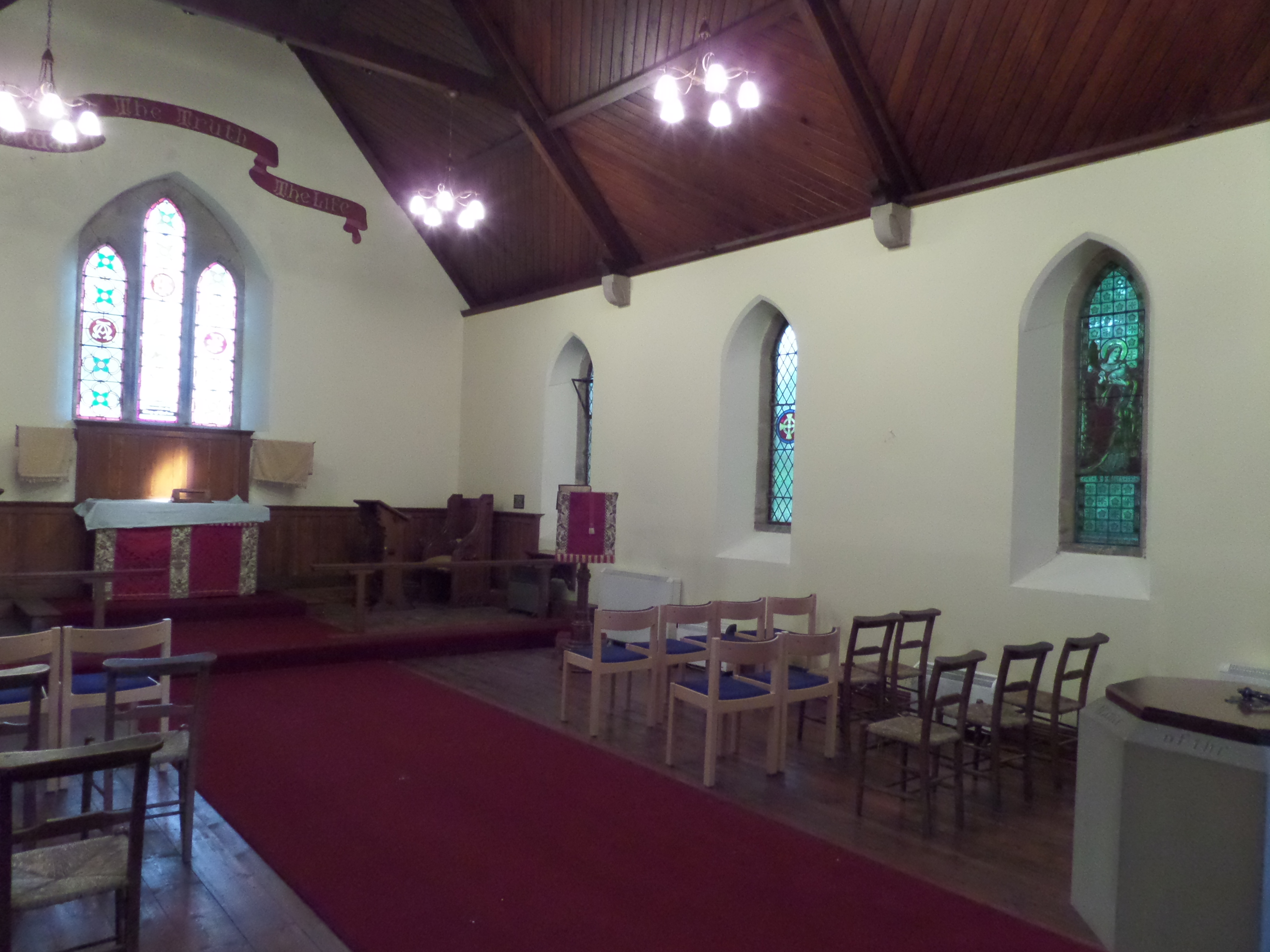
Exterior and interior of Denwick Chapel

Denwick is also home to Denwick Chapel. The small gothic styled chapel, was built as a gift on the expense of Algernon George Percy, 6th Duke of Northumberland at £537.4s.0d. (approximately £205,038.07), with the foundation stone laid on 10 February 1876 by Mrs Lisle, and was built by Robertson and Sons of Alnwick and designed by George Reavell, an architect at Alnwick Castle. The stone for the church is from Denwick Quarry. The church was built because villagers wanted a church in the village rather than travelling to Alnwick for services. The church has not been consecrated and is not dedicated to any saint yet does have a stained glass window of St. Anne, the mother of Mary and the maternal grandmother of Jesus. Services are still held there once a month at on the second Sunday at 11.15am with services alternating between Holy Communion (Common Worship) and Morning Prayer (Book of Common Prayer).

== Transport ==
Denwick is served by the 418 bus, operated by Travelsure. This service runs between Alnwick and Belford.

The main road through the village is the B1340, which provides a direct route to Alnwick. The Denwick interchange between the B1340 and the A1 was constructed in the 1980s as part of the Alnwick by-pass.
