= Snitter =

Village in Northumberland, England

Coordinates: 55.326°N 1.962°W

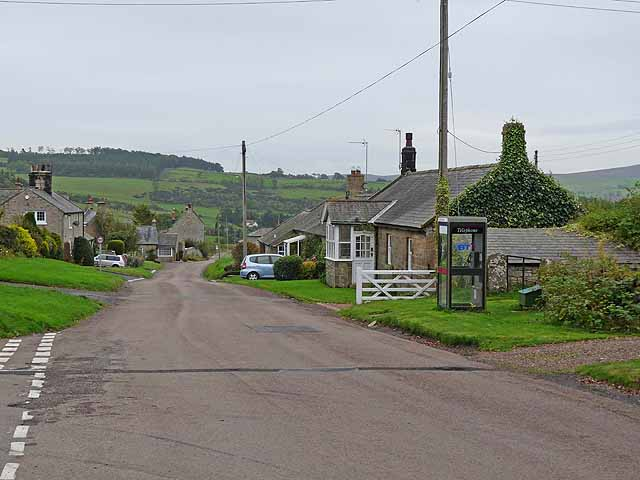

- Location within Northumberland
- Population: 108 (2011 census)
- OS grid reference: NU025035
- Unitary authority: Northumberland
- Ceremonial county: Northumberland
- Region: North East
- Country: England
- Sovereign state: United Kingdom
- Post town: MORPETH
- Postcode district: NE65
- Dialling code: 01669
- Police: Northumbria
- Fire: Northumberland
- Ambulance: North East
- UK Parliament: North Northumberland

Snitter is a village and civil parish in Northumberland, England. It is near the Northumberland National Park. The closest town is Rothbury.
