= Hepple =

Village in Northumberland, England

Coordinates: 55.298604°N 2.025170°W

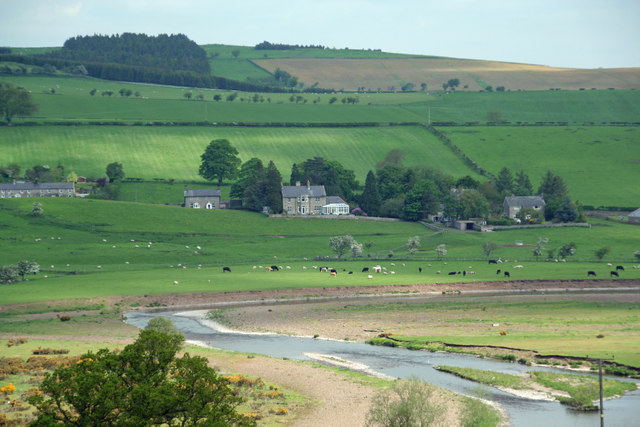
- Hepple

- Location within Northumberland
- Population: 144 (2011)
- OS grid reference: NT985005
- Civil parish: Rothbury
- Unitary authority: Northumberland
- Ceremonial county: Northumberland
- Region: North East
- Country: England
- Sovereign state: United Kingdom
- Post town: MORPETH
- Postcode district: NE65
- Police: Northumbria
- Fire: Northumberland
- Ambulance: North East
- UK Parliament: North Northumberland

Hepple is a small village and parish in rural Northumberland, 4 miles (6.4 km) west of Rothbury, which provides most of its local services. It is on the edge of the Northumberland National Park, and lies on the bank of the river Coquet, at a location which was on the Coquet Stop Line, of which a pillbox remains. It is on the road between Rothbury and Otterburn. The village contains a church, village hall and post office.

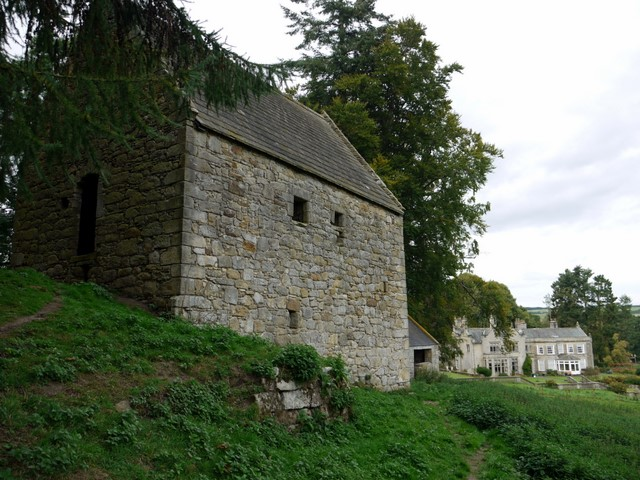
Woodhouses Bastle

Half a mile north-east of the village along the road to Rothbury are the ruins of Hepple Tower, a fourteenth-century tower house, which is listed by English Heritage as a building at risk. A mile to the west, close to the country house of Holystone Grange, is Woodhouses Bastle, dated 1602 and restored and re-roofed in the twentieth century, a well-preserved bastle which may have been converted from a pele tower.
