= Brinkburn =

Civil parish in Northumberland, England

Coordinates: 55.2813°N 1.8191°W

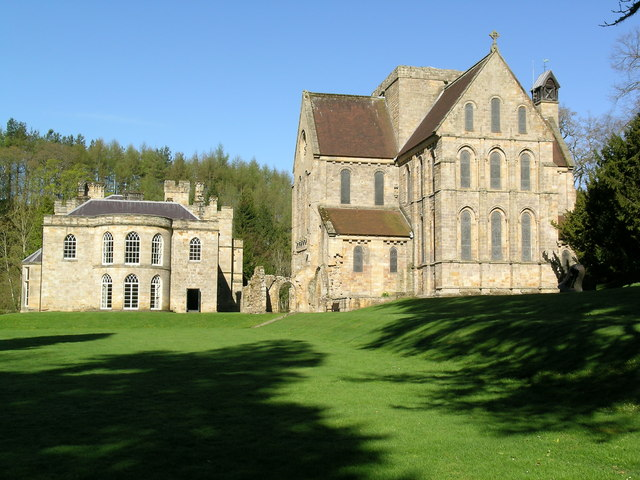

- Location within Northumberland
- Population: 222 (2011 census(including Hesleyhurst))
- OS grid reference: NZ115985
- Unitary authority: Northumberland
- Ceremonial county: Northumberland
- Region: North East
- Country: England
- Sovereign state: United Kingdom
- Post town: Morpeth
- Postcode district: NE65
- Police: Northumbria
- Fire: Northumberland
- Ambulance: North East

Brinkburn is a civil parish in Northumberland, England. It is divided by the River Coquet. The parish includes the hamlet of Pauperhaugh.

== History ==
The name "Brinkburn" means 'Brynca's stream'.

== Governance ==
The civil parish was formed on 1 April 1955 from the parishes of Brinkburn High Ward, Brinkburn Low Ward and Raw.

== See also ==
- Brinkburn Priory
- Brinkburn Mill
- Brinkburn railway station
