= Nunnykirk =

Civil parish in Northumberland, England

Coordinates: 55.227730°N 1.866030°W

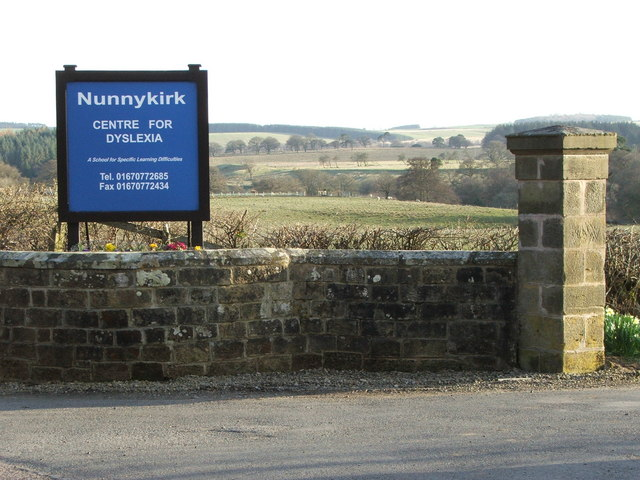

- Location within Northumberland
- Population: 160 (2011 census)
- OS grid reference: NZ0892
- Civil parish: Nunnykirk
- Unitary authority: Northumberland
- Ceremonial county: Northumberland
- Region: North East
- Country: England
- Sovereign state: United Kingdom
- Post town: Morpeth
- Postcode district: NE61
- Police: Northumbria
- Fire: Northumberland
- Ambulance: North East

Nunnykirk is a settlement and civil parish in the county of Northumberland, England. In 2011 the parish had a population of 160.

Nunnykirk is the location of Nunnykirk Hall, a former nunnery country house and current school.

== Governance ==
Nunnykirk was formerly a township in Nether Witton parish, in 1866 Nunnykirk became a civil parish in its own right, on 1 April 1955 the parishes of Coatyards, Ewesley, Healey and Combhill, Ritton Colt Park, Ritton White House, Todburn and Wingates were abolished and merged with Nunnykirk.
