= Alnwick District Council elections =

Local government elections in Northumberland, England

Alnwick District Council elections were generally held every four years between the council's creation in 1974 and its abolition in 2009. Alnwick District was a non-metropolitan district in Northumberland, England. The council was abolished and its functions transferred to Northumberland County Council with effect from 1 April 2009.

== Political control ==
The first election to the council was held in 1973, initially operating as a shadow authority before coming into its powers on 1 April 1974. From 1974 until its abolition in 2009 political control of the council was as follows:

Party in control	Years
Independent	1974–1979
No overall control	1979–1991
Liberal Democrats	1991–1995
No overall control	1995–2009

== Council elections ==
- 1973 Alnwick District Council election
- 1976 Alnwick District Council election
- 1979 Alnwick District Council election (New ward boundaries)
- 1983 Alnwick District Council election
- 1987 Alnwick District Council election
- 1991 Alnwick District Council election
- 1995 Alnwick District Council election
- 1999 Alnwick District Council election (New ward boundaries increased the number of seats by one)
- 2003 Alnwick District Council election
- 2007 Alnwick District Council election

== Result maps ==
2003 results map

2007 results map

== By-election results ==
=== 1995-1999 ===
Shilbottle By-Election 6 February 1997
Party	Candidate	Votes	%	±%
Liberal Democrats		365	37.1	
Conservative		324	32.9	
Labour		296	30.0	
Majority		41	4.2	
Turnout		985	40.0	
Liberal Democrats gain from Labour		Swing		

Rothbury By-Election 31 July 1997
Party	Candidate	Votes	%	±%
Liberal Democrats		775	81.9	+35.3
Conservative		171	18.1	+18.1
Majority		604	63.8	
Turnout		946		
Liberal Democrats hold		Swing		

=== 1999-2003 ===
Embleton By-Election 25 April 2002
Party	Candidate	Votes	%	±%
Liberal Democrats		220	58.5	−11.4
Independent		154	41.2	+41.2
Majority		66	17.3	
Turnout		374	47.5	
Liberal Democrats hold		Swing		

=== 2003-2007 ===
Shilbottle By-Election 12 June 2003
Party	Candidate	Votes	%	±%
Independent	A. Renton	N/A	N/A	N/A
Independent hold		Swing		

Shilbottle By-Election 14 July 2005
Party	Candidate	Votes	%	±%
Liberal Democrats	Ethel Mills	193	35.3	+3.1
Independent	John Taylor	167	30.5	−14.0
Labour	Mary Dixon	158	28.9	+5.6
Independent	Eric Thomason	29	5.3	+5.3
Majority		26	4.8	
Turnout		547	19.7	
Liberal Democrats hold		Swing		

Lesbury By-Election 6 April 2006
Party	Candidate	Votes	%	±%
Liberal Democrats	Robert Styring	300	39.0	+16.1
Independent	Judith Hill	225	29.3	−20.3
Conservative	Peter McIlroy	168	21.8	−5.7
Independent	Leslie Orange	76	9.9	+9.9
Majority		75	9.7	
Turnout		566	51.3	
Liberal Democrats gain from Conservative		Swing		

Amble West By-Election 26 October 2006
Party	Candidate	Votes	%	±%
Liberal Democrats	Ian Hinson	237	56.3	+21.6
Independent	Stanley Ireland	94	22.3	−19.7
Conservative	David Rixon	90	21.4	+21.4
Majority		143	34.0	
Turnout		421	26.0	
Liberal Democrats gain from Independent		Swing		
