= Cartington Castle =

Castle in Northumberland, England

- Cartington, Northumberland, England
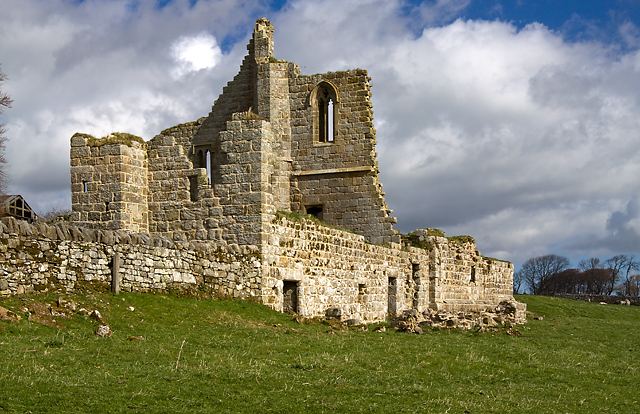

Site information
- Type: Castle
- Condition: Ruined

Location
- Shown within Northumberland
- Coordinates: 55°20′06″N 1°56′24″W

Site history
- Events: English Civil War

Garrison information
- Designations: UK Grade I

Cartington Castle is a ruinous, partly restored medieval English castle in the hamlet of Cartington, 2 miles (3.2 km) north-west of Rothbury in the county of Northumberland, England, looking down on the River Coquet. It is a Scheduled Ancient Monument and a Grade I listed building.

== History ==
=== Medieval period ===
Its first recorded owner was Ralph Fitzmain who held it in 1154. In the late 14th century a pele tower was built. This was extended to include a great hall, and probably a tower-defended courtyard, by John Cartington in 1442 when he was granted a licence to crenellate his home.

=== 16th century ===
In November 1515, Margaret, Queen of Scots, with her baby daughter Margaret stayed here on her flight from Scotland to London, having travelled from nearby Harbottle Castle. Nearly ten years later, Lord Dacre stationed his troops here on a march north to join the Earl of Surrey.

=== English Civil War ===
During the Civil War the castle was a major Royalist centre. Sir Edward Widdrington raised 2,000 foot Royalist soldiers and 200 horse and withheld a Parliamentary siege for over two hours in 1648, but the castle was eventually taken and slighted by the enemy.

=== Abandonment and conservation ===
Despite some demolition, the castle continued to be occupied until finally abandoned in the 1860s. In 1887 Lord Armstrong partially restored the castle in order to prevent its complete disintegration. Whilst ruinous, the castle is protected by its status as a Scheduled Ancient Monument and as a Grade I listed building.
