= Usway Burn =

River in Northumberland, England

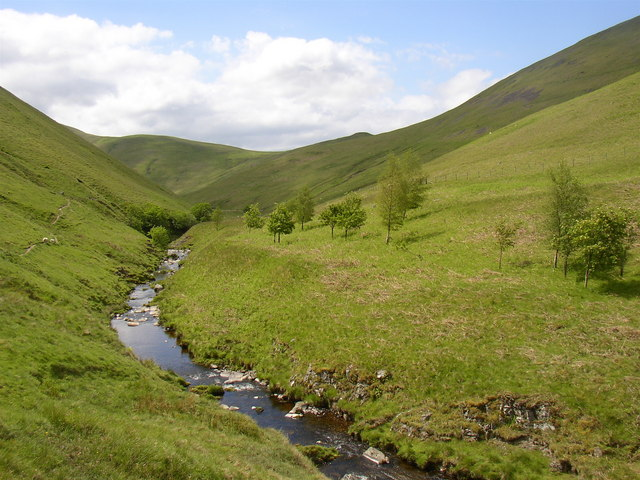
- Young trees in the Usway Burn valley

- Location within Northumberland

Location
- Country: United Kingdom
- County: Northumberland

Physical characteristics
- Mouth
  - coordinates: 55.362788°N 2.180575°W
- Discharge
  - location: Shillmoor

The Usway Burn is an upland river on the southern flanks of the Cheviot Hills, in the Northumberland National Park, England.

It is a tributary of the River Coquet and is about 15 km in length. It is located close to the northernmost end of the Pennine Way.

== Course ==
The Usway Burn has several tributaries and inlets, including some in the hills far to the north.

Cairn Hill, a 777m subsidiary of The Cheviot, is drained by both Coldwell Strand and Shedding Sike, the Usway Burn's northernmost tributaries.

Further south, the longer Davidson's Burn and Tod Sike join the Usway Burn from the western side, with sources very close to Scotland. Davidson's Linn waterfall was praised by the 20th-century travel writers F.R. Banks and Dippie Dixon.

The Clay Burn is an eastern tributary, which drains from streams on the edge of Bloodybush Edge hill (610m).

Uswayford is the northernmost settlement on the Usway Burn, by the hill Hazely Law (499m). Uswayford contains a farm and former quarry site. Previously there was a bed and breakfast at Uswayford, but as of 2013 this was no longer available.

Downriver in the less forested areas, Usway Burn and Hepden Burn (to the west) pass close to each other, running parallel for a few miles. Hepden Burn meets the River Coquet.

The Usway Burn runs south past the Fairhaugh House & Estate, and Batailshiel Haugh Farm between Saughy Hill and Shillhope Law (both approx. 500m high). About two miles further south is Shillmoor, where the Usway Burn meets its confluence with the River Coquet.

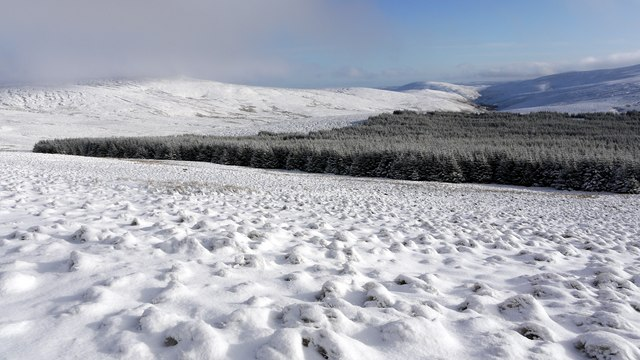
Usway forest, part of the river's northern catchment area

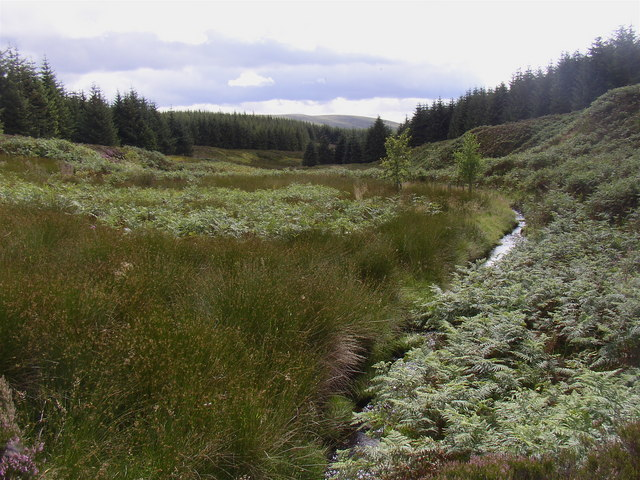
Davidson's Burn tributary in the Usway Forest

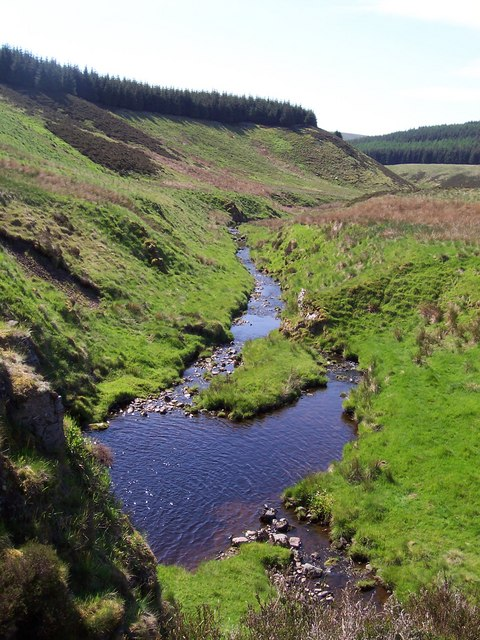
View south from Davidson's Linn

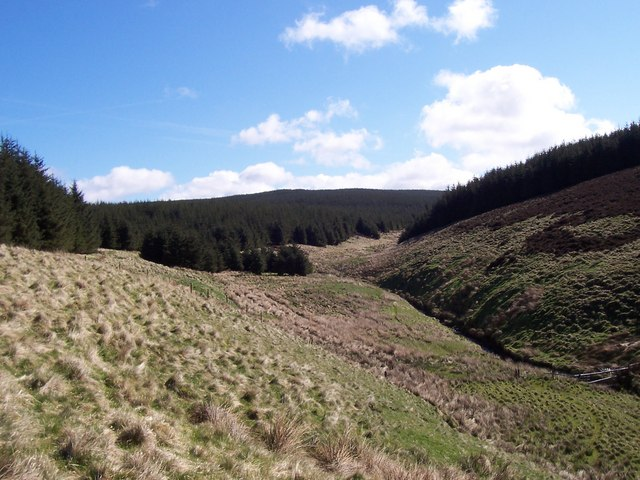
The Clay Burn and Uswayford Forest

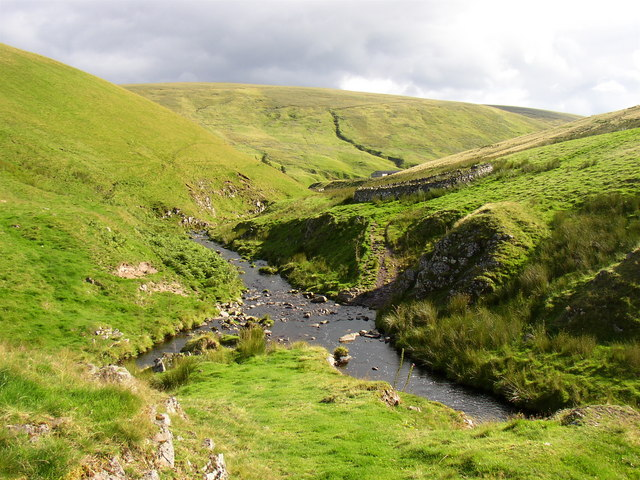
Usway Burn junction with Clay Burn (left). Sheepfold and Yarnspath Law in background

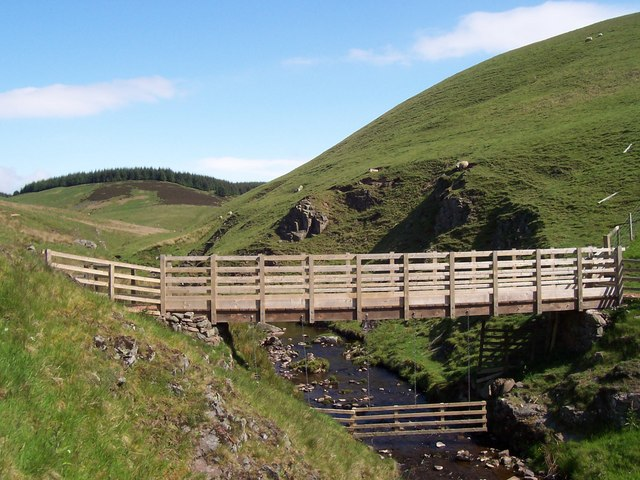
Usway Burn footbridge at Uswayford

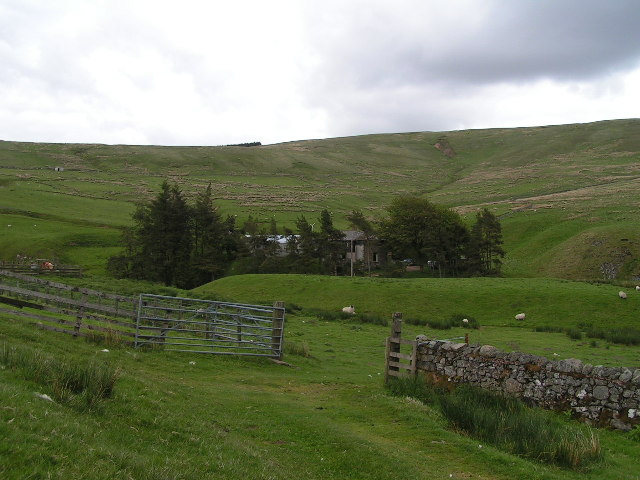
The remote Uswayford Farm

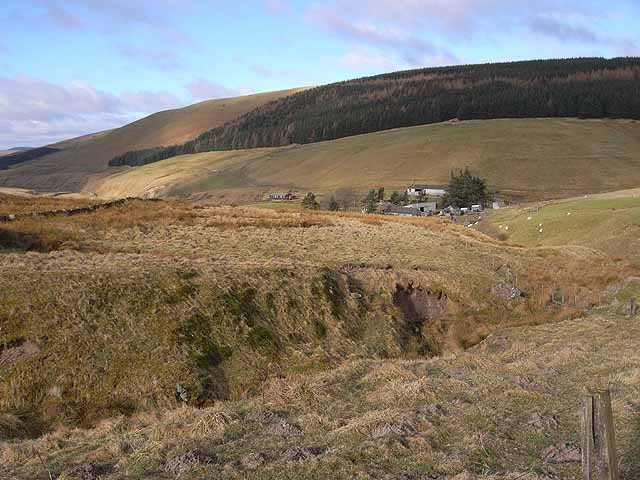
Uswayford buildings

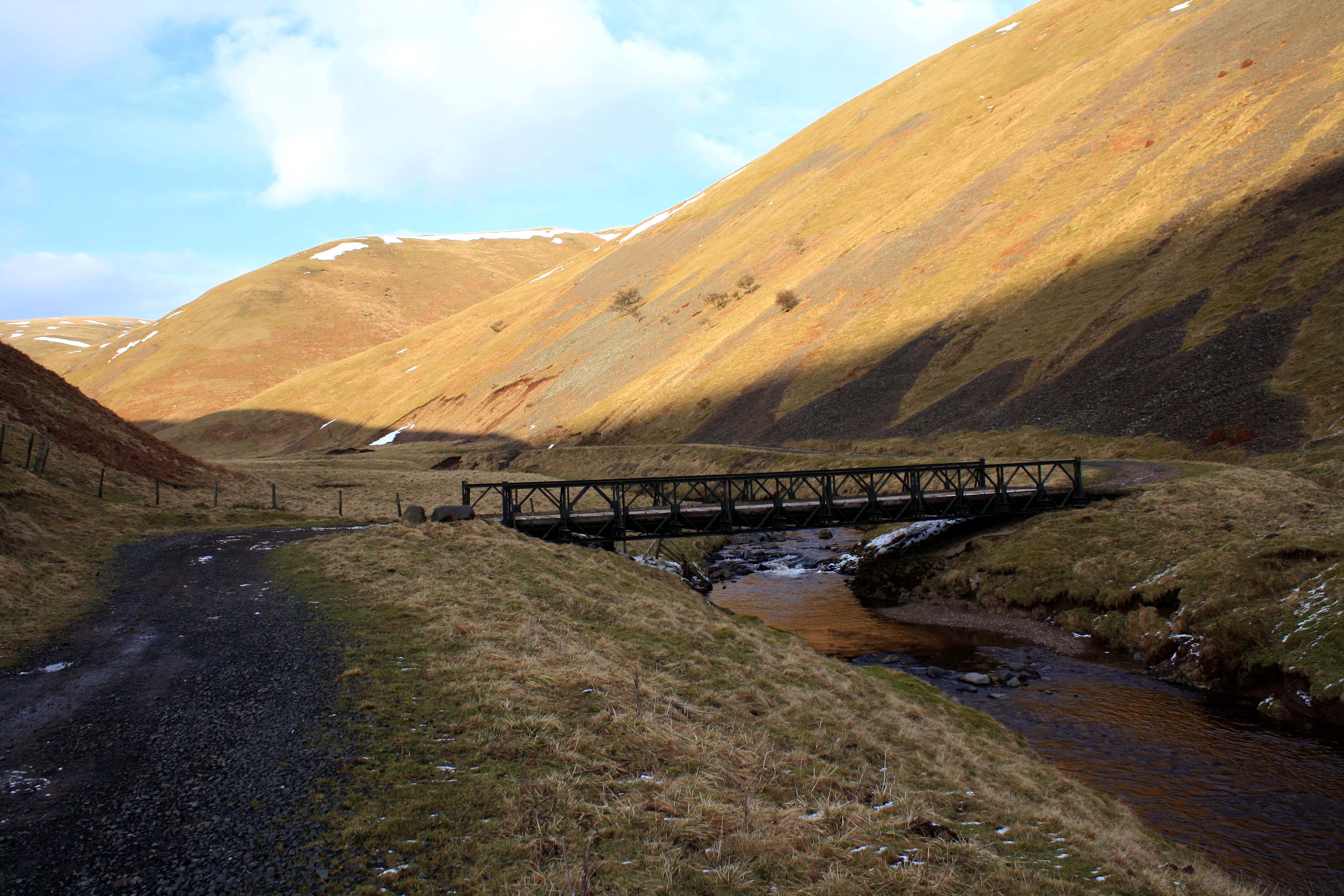
Bailey Bridge in shadow

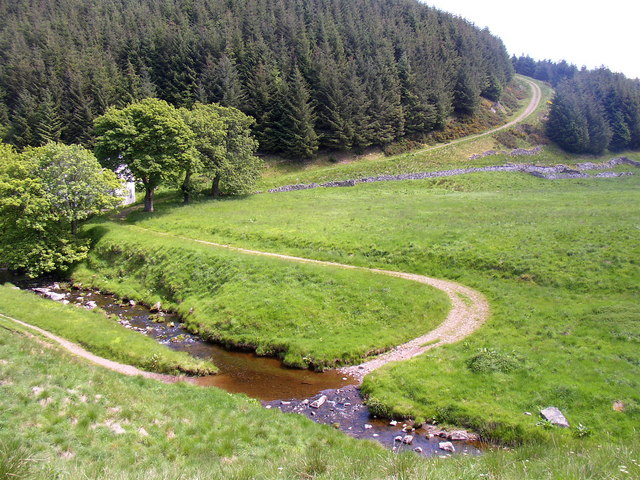
Ford at Fairhaugh House

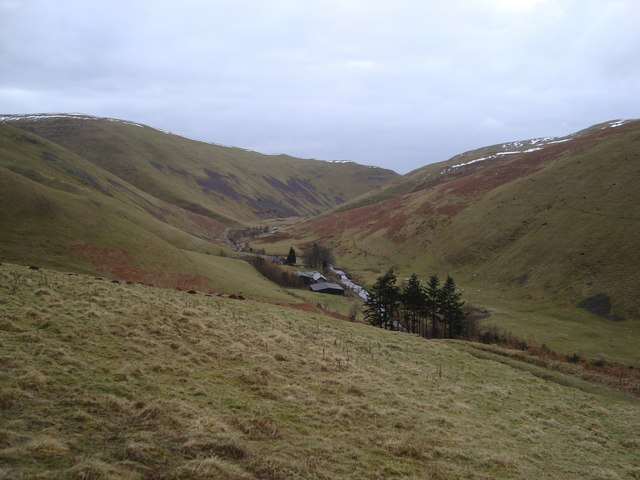
Batailshiel Haugh Farm

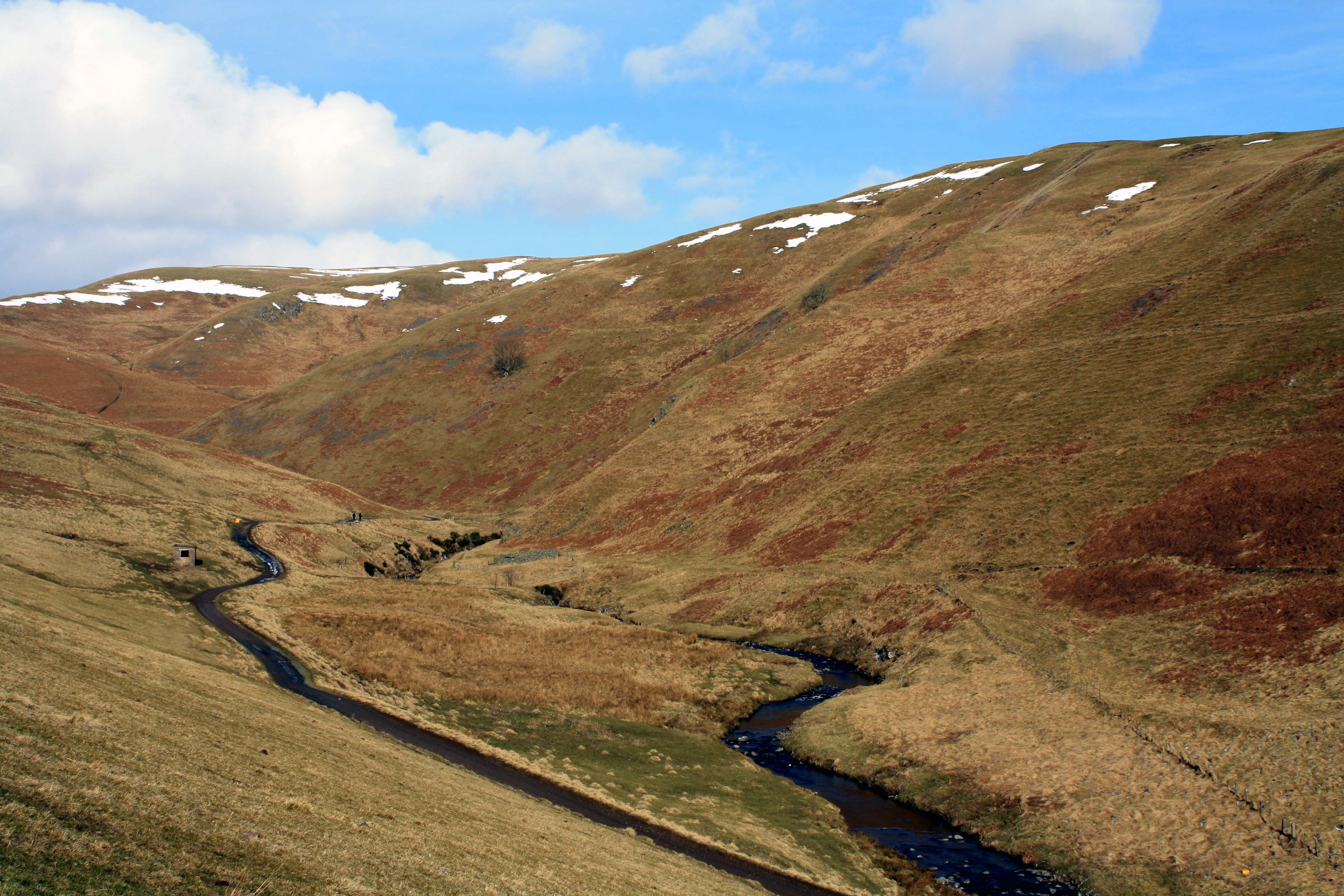
Southern Usway Burn and track to Batailshiel

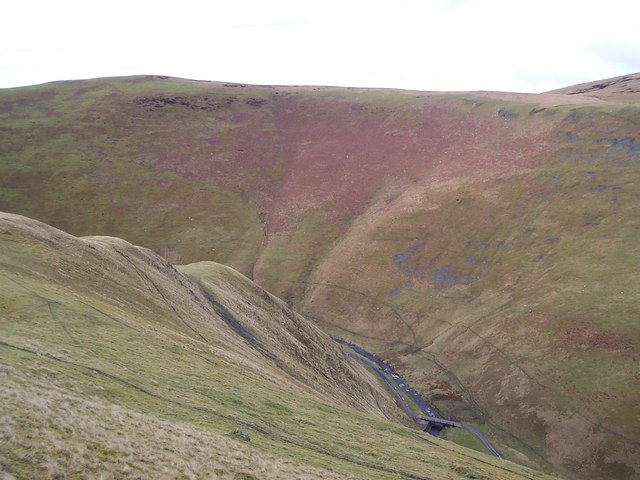
Footbridge viewed from above Spit Hopes

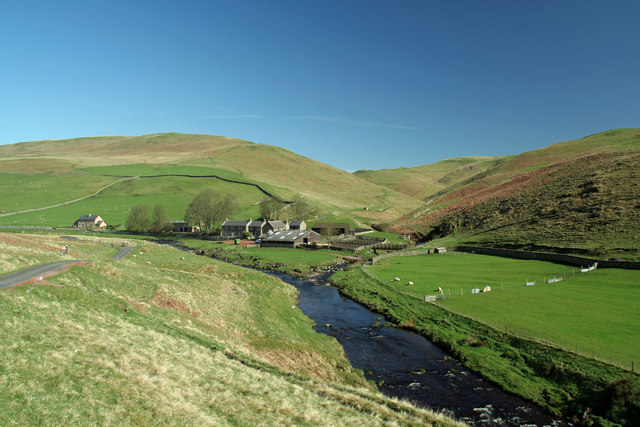
Usway Burn (right) flows into the River Coquet

== See also ==
- River Coquet
- River Alwin
- List of rivers of England
