= Cartington =

Village in Northumberland, England

Coordinates: 55.334°N 1.946°W

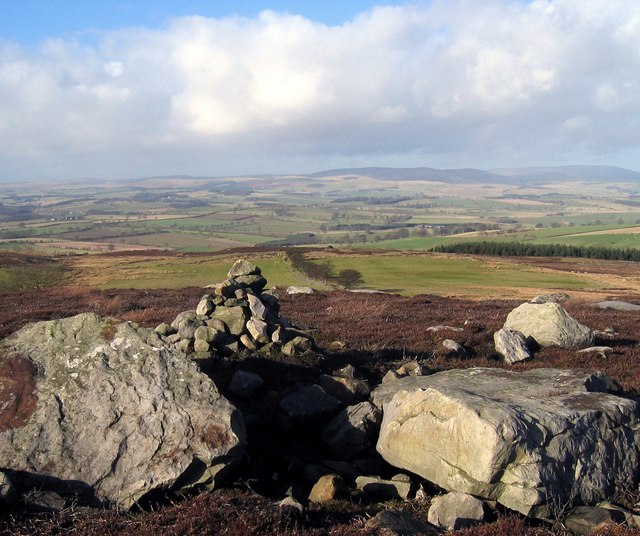
- Football Cairn

- Location within Northumberland
- Population: 97 (2001)
- OS grid reference: NU035045
- Civil parish: Thropton
- Unitary authority: Northumberland
- Ceremonial county: Northumberland
- Region: North East
- Country: England
- Sovereign state: United Kingdom
- Post town: MORPETH
- Postcode district: NE65
- Dialling code: 01669
- Police: Northumbria
- Fire: Northumberland
- Ambulance: North East
- UK Parliament: North Northumberland

Cartington is a village and former civil parish, now in the parish of Thropton, in Northumberland, England. It is about 11 miles (18 km) south west of Alnwick, and about 2 miles (3 km) north west of Rothbury. In 2019 it had an adult population of 95, after having returned a population of 97 in 2001.

== History ==
Although there is reason to suppose that the history of Cartington can be traced on the strength of its place-name to the Early Middle Ages, Cartington is not named until the Pipe Roll dated 1233 as Kertindon, a holding of the King's Forester, Ralph Fitz-Main. This family remained significant in the township, but increasingly land within it was held by another family, called the de Beaumains, who in time changed their name to Cartington, and eventually took over the manor here. The Cartington family remained influential until the death of John de Cartington in 1494, after which it passed through marriage to Sir Edward Radcliffe of Derwentwater. In 1601 it transferred as the dowry of Mary Radcliffe on her marriage to Roger Widdrington.

In 1515 it was briefly visited by the Scottish queen, Margaret Tudor, where she rested for four days (having recently given birth to a daughter, also called Margaret, later Lady Lennox) on her way further south to safety. It was noted at the time that she was unable to cope with travelling in a horse-drawn litter, so she was instead carried by servants of Lord Dacre.

The Widdringtons espoused the Royalist cause in the English Civil Wars, with Roger Widdrington supporting the King's Army during the Bishops' Wars of 1639, and his son, Sir Edward Widdrington, raised a brigade of two thousand foot and two hundred horse which served under the Marquis of Newcastle. After the defeat at Marston Moor he went into exile, not returning until the Restoration. Cartington remained in his wife's hands, and the family remained loyal to the King's cause, for in 1648 a Major Sanderson, serving under Parliament, made a raid across Northumberland to take by surprise a scattered remnant of a Royalist force, with the final action being at Cartington Castle, where Sir Richard Tempest was surprised and laid siege to for two hours before being captured. Subsequently the family were sequestered for their support of the King; being fined £400 for giving intelligence to the King's party and with Cartington Castle being slighted to prevent its further use.

By the early 18th century it became the property of the Talbots, but a John Talbot lost the estate for his role in the Jacobite Rising of 1715, passing first to Giles Alcock, a merchant from Newcastle upon Tyne. In 1883 it became part of the estate of Sir William George Armstrong of nearby Cragside.

Cartington was formerly a township in Rothbury parish, from 1866 Cartington was a civil parish in its own right.

In September 2019, with only 95 electors living in the parish, Cartington Parish Council voted to abolish itself, with the land distributed between neighbouring Thropton and Rothbury parishes, on 1 April 2021 the parish was abolished.

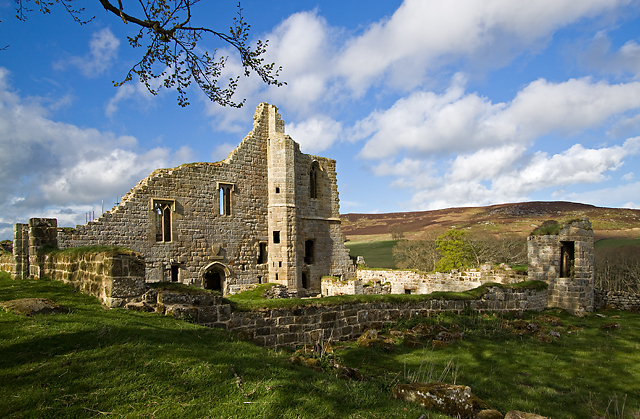
The ruins of Cartington Castle.

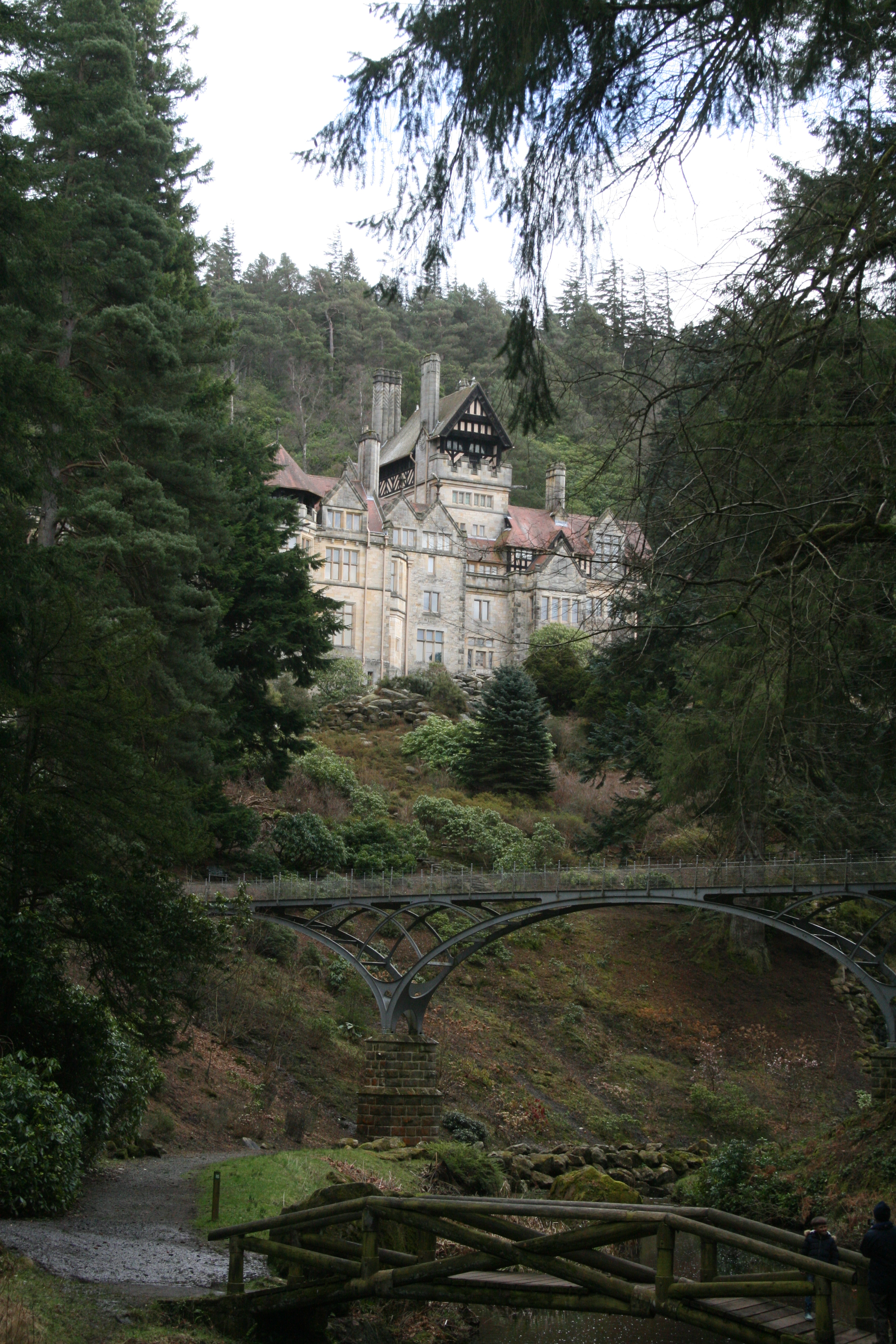
Cragside.

== Landmarks ==
Cartington Castle is a ruinous, partly restored medieval castle. It is a Scheduled Ancient Monument and a Grade I listed building. Its first recorded owner was Ralph Fitzmain who held it in 1154. In the late 14th century a pele tower was built. In November 1515 Margaret, Queen of Scots, with her baby daughter Margaret stayed here on her journey south from Harbottle Castle. Nearly ten years later, Lord Dacre stationed his troops here on a march north to join the Earl of Surrey. The castle continued to be occupied until finally abandoned in the 1860s. In 1887 Lord Armstrong partially restored the castle in order to prevent its complete disintegration.

In the south of the former parish is Cragside, a country house built by Lord Armstrong and maintained by the National Trust. It was the first house in the world to be lit by hydro-electric power.
