= Thropton =

Coordinates: 55.314°N 1.958°W

- Hamlet
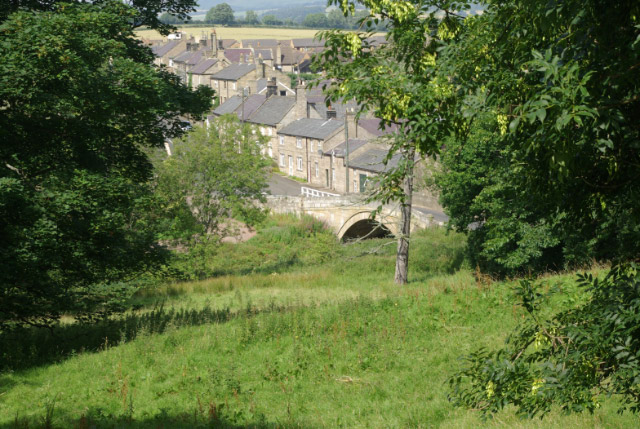
- View of Thropton from the east bank of Wreigh Burn, a tributary of the River Coquet to the west bank where the majority of the village stands.

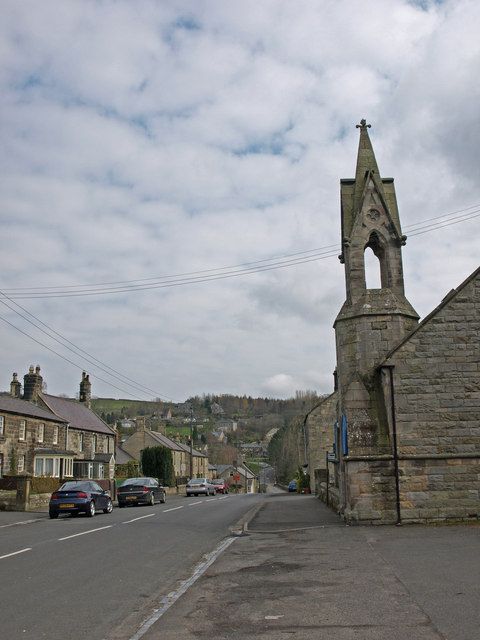
- Looking southeast along the B6341

- Location within Northumberland
- Population: 458 (2011 census)
- OS grid reference: NU027023
- Unitary authority: Northumberland
- Ceremonial county: Northumberland
- Region: North East
- Country: England
- Sovereign state: United Kingdom
- Post town: MORPETH
- Postcode district: NE65
- Dialling code: 01669
- Police: Northumbria
- Fire: Northumberland
- Ambulance: North East
- UK Parliament: North Northumberland

Thropton is a hamlet in Northumberland, England, located on the River Coquet, and its tributary Wreigh Burn. With a population of 780 (2021 census) it is situated 1.9 miles (3.1 km) west of the village of Rothbury connected by the B6431 near the junction of the Wreigh Burn and the River Coquet. In the hamlet is a stone bridge over the Wreigh Burn which was built in 1811. Thropton is on the edge of Northumberland National Park, and the surrounding area north and south of the hamlet consists of haughs, and also to the south on the opposite side of the Coquet lies Simonside Hills, a hill range that has many crags dotted along it. Thropton was known in the past as Tattie-toon, a reference to the fertility of the soil in the surrounding area.

== Amenities ==
The post office closed in approximately 2018, likewise the small village shop in which it was located, and the adjacent vehicle repair garage closed in November 2020 and reopened in 2022. In November 2022 a SPAR opened in Thropton, the shop has a floor area of 3,000 sq. ft. and has a four-pump forecourt operated by Shell. The neon Shell sign has caused a row over light pollution due to Thropton being on the edge of Northumberland National Park which is a dark-sky preserve, however a poll on a community Facebook page showed that 98% to 99% of residents did not think the sign was a problem . The row has been reported by the national media, including an article in The Telegraph and a mention on Jeremy Vine. Thropton has a pub the Three Wheat Heads, a 300-year-old coaching inn.

There is a small Church of England church, a Roman Catholic church and a Plymouth Brethren Church.

== Landmarks ==
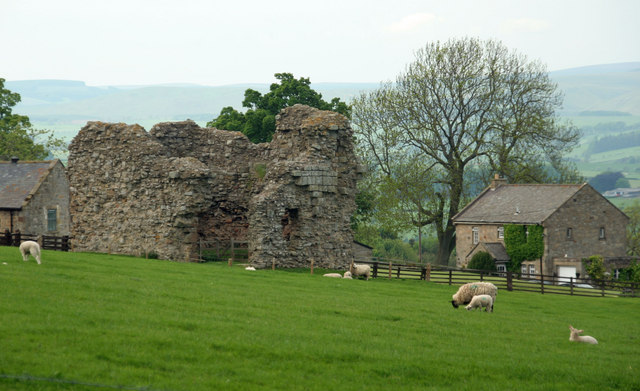
Great Tosson Tower

A little over a mile to the south of the village are the ruins of Great Tosson Tower, a pele tower probably built in the late fifteenth century and later used as part of a system of watch towers designed to curb the activities of the Border Reivers. A short distance from Great Tosson is Tosson lime kiln, designed by architect George Reavell in 1888, disused and restored in appearance by Northumberland National Park Authority. The site has a small car park and picnic site, and has fine views across the valley to Thropton main village and Rothbury. An information board at the site relates how a cow once fell down inside it.

Thropton SPAR is the main shop and petrol station in the village.

== Geography ==
Thropton has the B6431 running though, with the majority of the hamlet based along the road. Thropton also had two C roads, the C176 road from Thropton to Netherton via Snitter connects to the B6341, and is connected to the C178 running from Thropton to Whittingham via Cartington.

== Culture ==
On the third Saturday in September Thropton holds its annual village show. The show is in field on next to the junction of the C176 road from Thropton to Snitter, and the C178 from Thropton to Cartington. leading from Thropton to Netherton. Alongside local trade and craft stalls, the show also has a Northumbrian pipe band, and fell race where runners run to and up the Simonside Hills and back. The village show started in 1915 and 2015 the centenary was celebrated.

The Coquetdale Music Centre is also present in the village occupying a former United Reform Church. It is managed by the Coquetdale Music Trust. It hosts year round music events and also has a recording studio complex.

== Transport ==
Thropton is the terminus for the X14 Thropton - Rothbury - Morpeth bus which is a lifeline to the rural community, with many services continuing towards Newcastle upon Tyne. It is currently operated by Arriva Northumbria and was formerly operated by Go North East.
