= Alwinton =

Village in Northumberland, England

Coordinates: 55.351°N 2.126°W

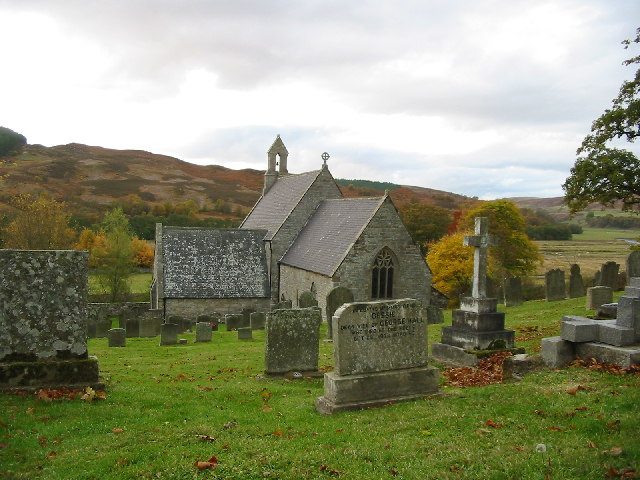
- St Michael and All Angels

- Location within Northumberland
- Population: 71 (2001 census)
- OS grid reference: NT925065
- Unitary authority: Northumberland
- Ceremonial county: Northumberland
- Region: North East
- Country: England
- Sovereign state: United Kingdom
- Post town: MORPETH
- Postcode district: NE65
- Dialling code: 01669
- Police: Northumbria
- Fire: Northumberland
- Ambulance: North East
- UK Parliament: North Northumberland

Alwinton (previously named "Allenton" and sometimes still referred to as this) is a village and former parish in Northumberland, England. Alwinton is named after the nearby River Alwin, and means farm on the River Alwin.

Alwinton lies at the head of the Coquet valley, on the edge of both the Otterburn Army Training Estate and the Northumberland National Park. The village is roughly 10 miles (16 km) from the border with Scotland, and about 18 miles (29 km) to the west of Alnwick.

The neighbouring village of Harbottle and Harbottle Castle are about 2.5 kilometres (1.6 mi) from Alwinton. A road continues past Alwinton into the Cheviot Hills where it terminates at the ancient Roman military encampment of Chew Green.

Having no shops, Alwinton's social life centres on the Rose and Thistle Inn, a public house owned by the Latchams. Regular Church of England services are offered at St. Michael and All Angels, which traditionally serves the parish of Alwinton encompassing the nearby townships of Biddlestone, Burradon, Clennell, Fairhaugh, Farnham, Linbriggs, Netherton, Peels, and Sharperton. In the early 21st century several of rural Northumberland's least populated parishes were merged into slightly larger units, and Alwinton was one example, being merged with the neighbouring Biddlestone (where from the Census 2011 the population is included).

== Governance ==
Alwinton is in the parliamentary constituency of Berwick-upon-Tweed.

== Historical population and surnames ==
Surnames of Alwinton residents during the period 1538 to 1828 gathered from militia lists, parish books, feodary books and poll books include Belany, Bell, Bertram, Bland, Brokyt, Brown, Browne, Burn, Charleton, Clarke, Clavering, Clennell, Davison, Drybrough, Dykson, Foreste, Gibson, Gladstaines, Hall, Handley, Kirkup, Levingstone, Martin, Moses, Myngzies, Nesbit, Nevison, Patonson, Peary, Potts, Pratt, Robson, Scott, Selby, Starbecke, Steynson, Stuart, Thirwall, Trumble, Turnbull, Wallis, Whyt, Widdrington, Wilkinson, Wilson, and Young (Dixon, 1903, pp. 173, 215, 230).

Census records for Alwinton township during the 19th and 20th centuries indicate a gradual decline in population:

Year	1801	1811	1821	1831	1841	1851	1861	1871	1881	1891
Population	102	103	106	85	78	71	64	83	88	60
Year	1901	1911	1921	1931						
Population	58	53	51	43						

== Religious sites ==
The Parish Church of St Michael and All Angels is an early Norman church, and was built on a hillside in the late 11th century or 12th century. Little historical information is available about Alwinton prior to 1245, when the value of its vicarage was first recorded. In 1279, two prisoners escaped from Harbottle Castle and fled to Alwinton church, where they confessed to thievery and abjured the realm.

The church building was significantly neglected in the 15th and 16th centuries, to the extent that a Court of High Commission reported "the walls of the church and chancell are in great decay, noe glass in the windowes and noe doores for the church". Major repairs were finally funded and completed in the 1720s. The church was largely rebuilt in the 19th century. The crypt was last used for a burial in 1868 and is now inaccessible. The church is now a Grade II* listed building.

== Alwinton Border Shepherds Show ==
The annual Border Shepherds Show, a traditional agricultural show or fair featuring sheep farming in the borders area of England and Scotland, is held on the second Saturday of October. The Alwinton show is the last agricultural show of the season in the borders area. Traditionally, it marks the end of summer and the time for hill farmers to begin preparations for winter.

== Images gallery ==
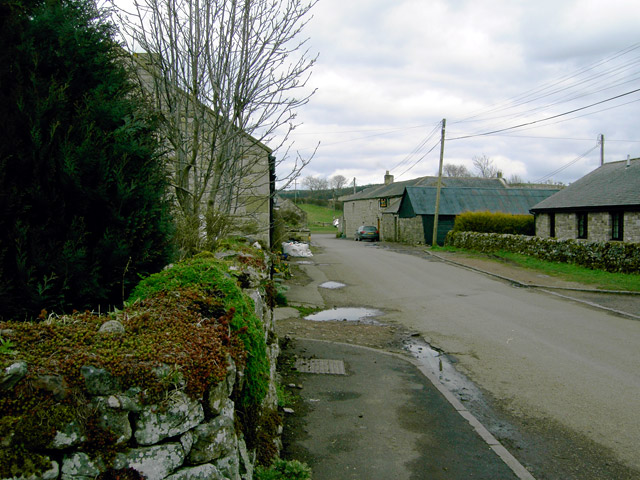
Alwinton in 2008

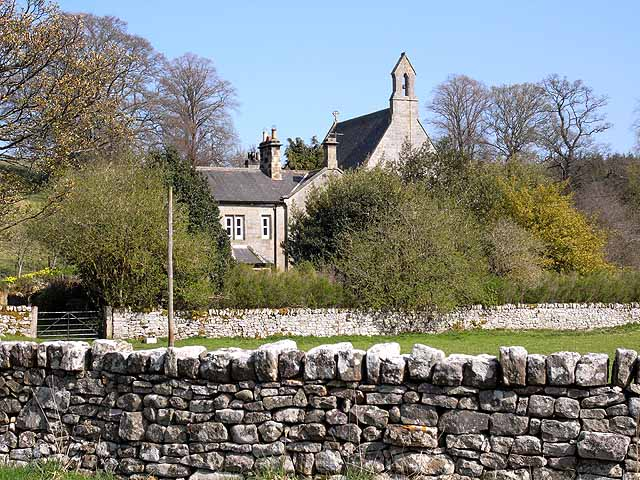
St Michael and All Angels, 2009

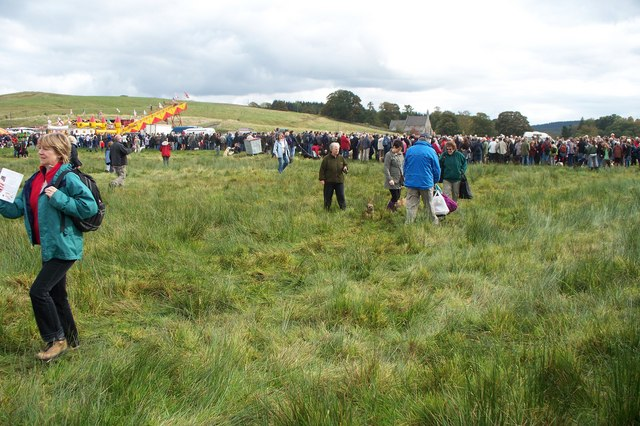
Show Day in October 2009

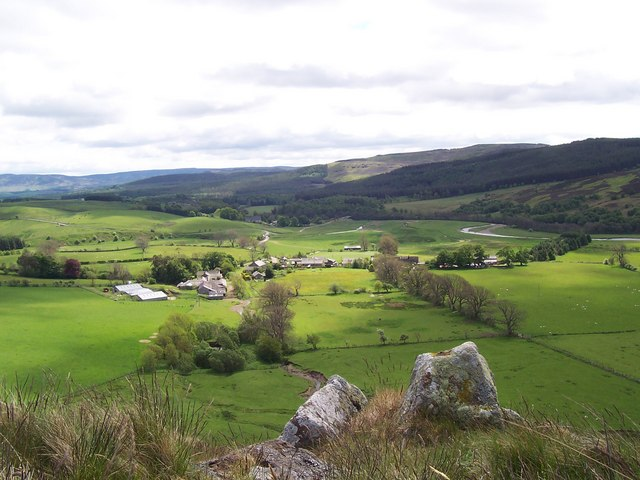
Alwinton viewed from Castle Hills

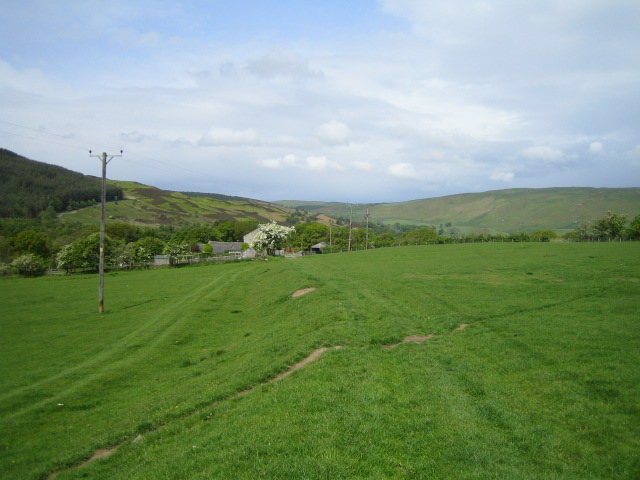
Bridleway near Low Alwinton

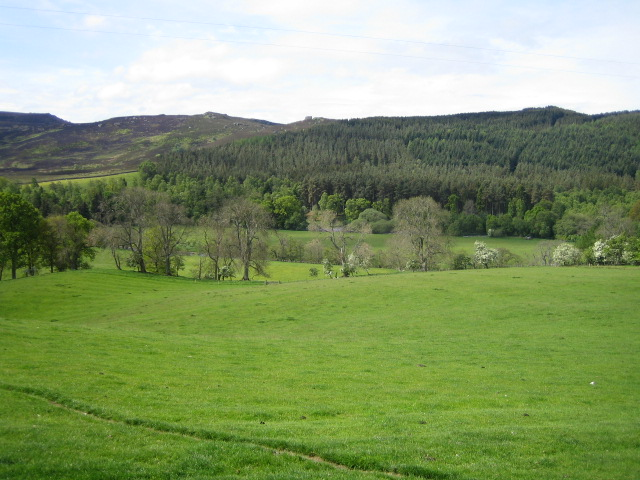
Coquetdale near Low Alwinton looking south from the bridleway – in background Harbottle Woods and the Harbottle Hills (left)

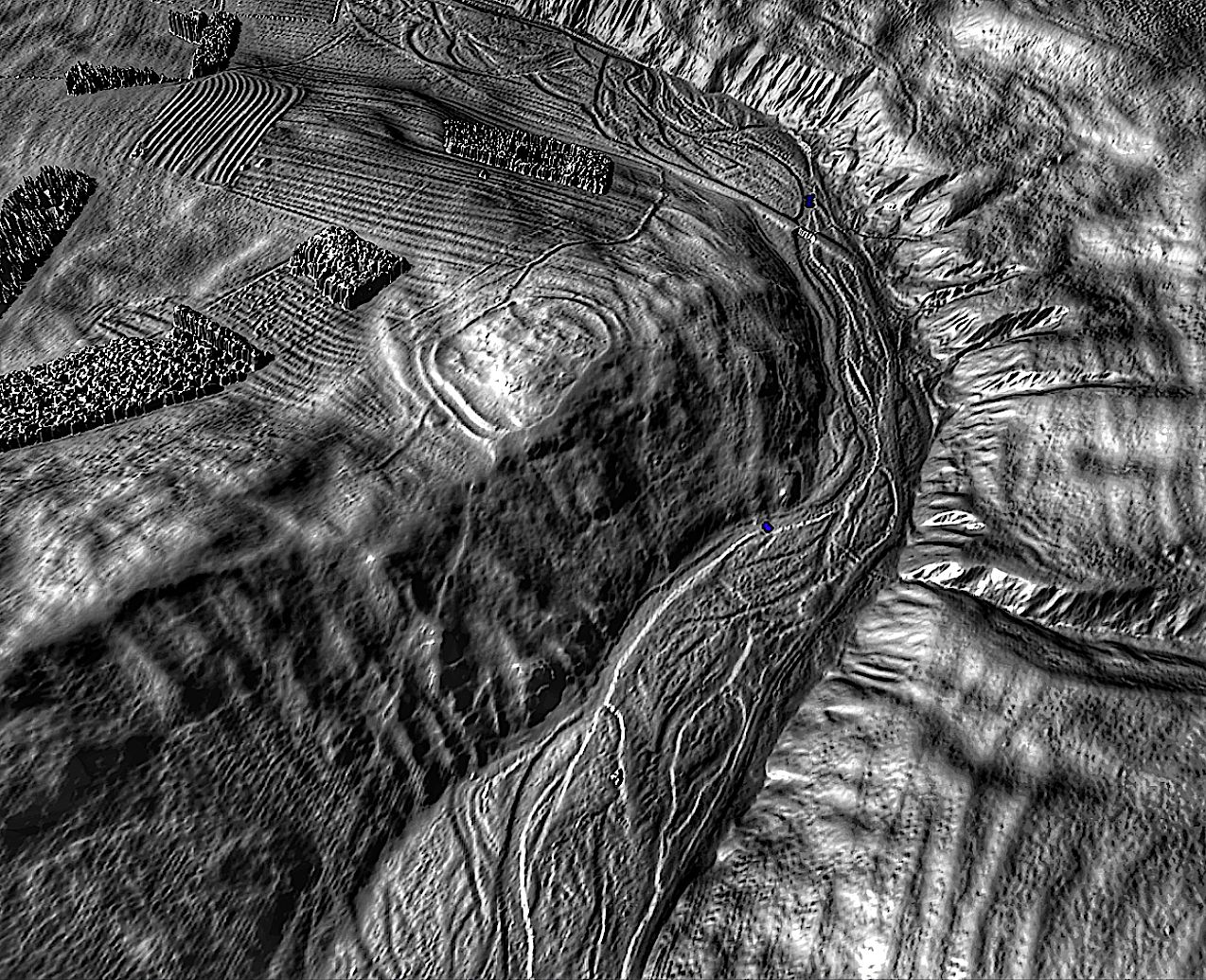
A lidar view of Alwinton's local hillfort, Camp Knowe, located north of the village.
