= Burradon =

Burradon may refer to two villages in England:

- Burradon, Northumberland, near Alnwick
- Burradon, Tyne and Wear, which historically, was also in Northumberland
