= Holystone, Northumberland =

Village in Northumberland, England

Coordinates: 55.317°N 2.072°W

Holystone
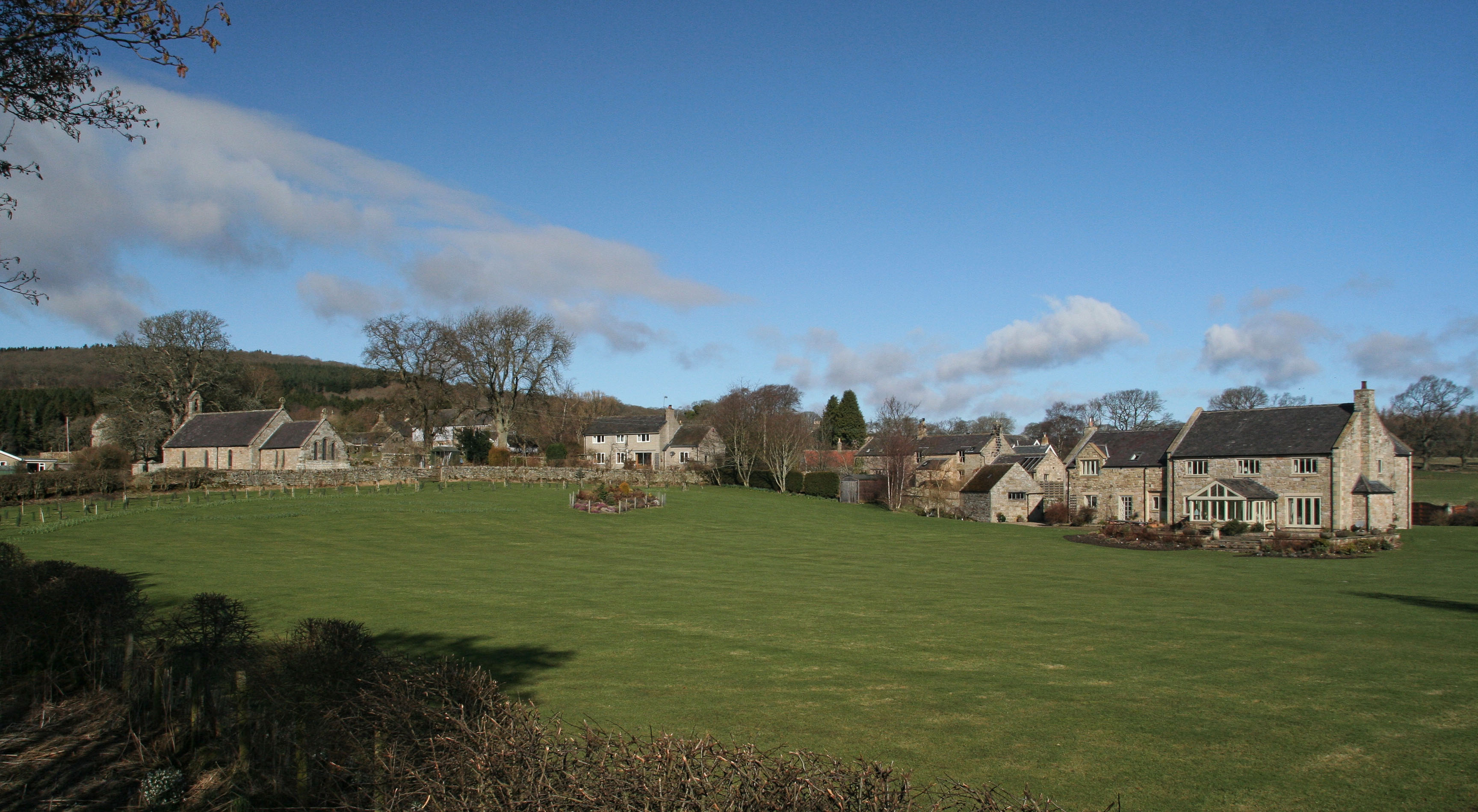
- Holystone

- Location within Northumberland
- OS grid reference: NT955025
  - London: 275 mi (443 km) SSE
- Civil parish: Harbottle
- Unitary authority: Northumberland
- Ceremonial county: Northumberland
- Region: North East
- Country: England
- Sovereign state: United Kingdom
- Post town: MORPETH
- Postcode district: NE65
- Dialling code: 01669
- Police: Northumbria
- Fire: Northumberland
- Ambulance: North East
- UK Parliament: Berwick-upon-Tweed

Holystone is a small village and former civil parish, now in the parish of Harbottle, in Northumberland, England. It lies on the edge of (and just within) the Northumberland National Park on the north bank of the River Coquet. A significant landmark is Holy Well, traditionally the site of early Christian baptisms, and the source of Holystone's water supply. In 1951 the parish had a population of 71.

In the early 12th century Holystone became the home of a priory of Augustinian Canonesses. The priory buildings were demolished during the reformation in 1541.

In 1903, Newcastle upon Tyne-based architect Frank West Rich purchased Dues Hill Grange and 3000 acres of land in Holystone, which he subsequently renovated.

== Governance ==
Holystone is in the parliamentary constituency of Berwick-upon-Tweed. On 1 April 1955 the parish was abolished and merged with Harbottle.
