= 1973 Alnwick District Council election =

1973 UK local government election

30 May 1973	1976 →

All 28 seats to Alnwick District Council 15 seats needed for a majority
	First party	Second party
Party	Independent	Labour
Seats won	25	3
Popular vote	18,767	4,107
Percentage	82.0%	18.0%
Control of Council after election
Independent

Elections to Alnwick District Council were held on the 30th of May 1973 alongside other local elections for Non-metropolitan district councils across England. The election was mainly fought between Independent politicians with a few wards being contested by Labour candidates. This was the first election for Alnwick District Council after it was created by the Local Government Act 1972. Although the election took place in 1973, the elected council only operated as a shadow authority until 1 April 1974 when they took over the powers of the previous council. The district was formed on 1 April 1974 as a merger of the urban districts of Alnwick and Amble and the rural districts of Alnwick and Rothbury.

== Election result ==
Alnwick local election result 1973
Party	Seats	Gains	Losses	Net gain/loss	Seats %	Votes %	Votes	+/−
Independent	25	25	0	▲25	89.3	82.0	18,767	new
Labour	3	3	0	▲3	10.7	18.0	4,107	new

== Ward results ==
The result for each ward was as follows:

Harbottle
Party	Candidate	Votes	%	±%
Independent	J Coatsworth	235	65.5	
Independent	M Blakey	124	34.5	
Majority		111	30.9	
Turnout		359	65.8	
Registered electors		546		

Longframlington
Party	Candidate	Votes	%	±%
Independent	M Keen	183	55.1	
Independent	F Hill	149	44.9	
Majority		34	10.2	
Turnout		332	58.8	
Registered electors		565		

No. 1 (Alnwick) (7)
Party	Candidate	Votes	%	±%
Independent	I Robertson	1,263	76.6	
Independent	H Reavell	909	55.1	
Independent	D Davidson	897	54.4	
Independent	W Proudlock	896	54.3	
Independent	C Oliver	857	52.0	
Independent	J Young	754	45.7	
Independent	R Waddell	580	35.2	
Independent	C Cookson	527	32.0	
Labour	J Wright	384	23.3	
Independent	W Young	364	22.1	
Labour	M Lawrence	363	22.0	
Majority		354	21.5	
Turnout		1,649	28.8	
Registered electors		5,726		

No. 2 (Amble) (5)
Party	Candidate	Votes	%	±%
Labour	J Gilgannon	1,193	50.8	
Labour	W Mitchell	1,190	50.6	
Independent	T Straffen	1,158	49.3	
Labour	D Bell	977	41.6	
Independent	C Turnbull	975	41.5	
Independent	A Rowell	969	41.2	
Independent	N Henderson	948	40.3	
Independent	C Murray	866	36.9	
Majority		3	0.1	
Turnout		2,350	63.5	
Registered electors		3,701		

No. 3 (Lesbury) (2)
Party	Candidate	Votes	%	±%
Independent	H Philipson	459	71.8	
Independent	J Baxter	429	67.1	
Independent	W Robertson	390	61.0	
Majority		30	4.7	
Turnout		639	53.8	
Registered electors		1,187		

No. 4 (Embleton)
Party	Candidate	Votes	%	±%
Independent	P Bridgeman	252	43.5	
Independent	S Purvis	237	40.9	
Independent	M Sutherland	90	15.5	
Majority		15	2.6	
Turnout		579	51.6	
Registered electors		1,123		

No. 5 (Longhoughton)
Party	Candidate	Votes	%	±%
Independent	R Huggins	246	52.8	
Independent	A White	220	47.2	
Majority		26	5.6	
Turnout		466	50.5	
Registered electors		922		

No. 6 (Shilbottle) (2)
Party	Candidate	Votes	%	±%
Independent	E Tully	300	89.0	
Independent	J Swordly	97	28.8	
Independent	W Tearney	95	28.2	
Independent	J Ternent	93	27.6	
Independent	P Blenkinsop	88	26.1	
Majority		203	60.2	
Turnout		337	27.4	
Registered electors		1,232		

No. 7 (Warkworth) (2)
Party	Candidate	Votes	%	±%
Independent	A Curry	414	64.4	
Independent	O Farrell	319	49.6	
Independent	H Slaughter	295	45.9	
Independent	W Carr	257	40.0	
Majority		95	14.8	
Turnout		643	37.3	
Registered electors		1,725		

No. 8 (Felton)
Party	Candidate	Votes	%	±%
Independent	K Ainsley	194	47.0	
Independent	F Widdringron	152	36.8	
Independent	G Armstrong	67	16.2	
Majority		42	10.2	
Turnout		413	49.4	
Registered electors		836		

No. 9 (Edlingham)
Party	Candidate	Votes	%	±%
Independent	M Hill	unopposed		

No. 10 (Rothbury) (2)
Party	Candidate	Votes	%	±%
Independent	M Thompson	438	77.9	
Independent	J Miller	374	66.5	
Independent	L Wright	311	55.3	
Majority		64	11.4	
Turnout		562	34.2	
Registered electors		1,641		

No. 11 (Whittingham)
Party	Candidate	Votes	%	±%
Independent	R Smith	unopposed		

No. 13 (Elsdon)
Party	Candidate	Votes	%	±%
Independent	R Elliott	190	64.2	
Independent	A Tait	60	20.3	
Independent	G McKenzie	46	15.5	
Majority		130	43.9	
Turnout		296	50.4	
Registered electors		587		
