= River Alwin =

River in Northumberland, England

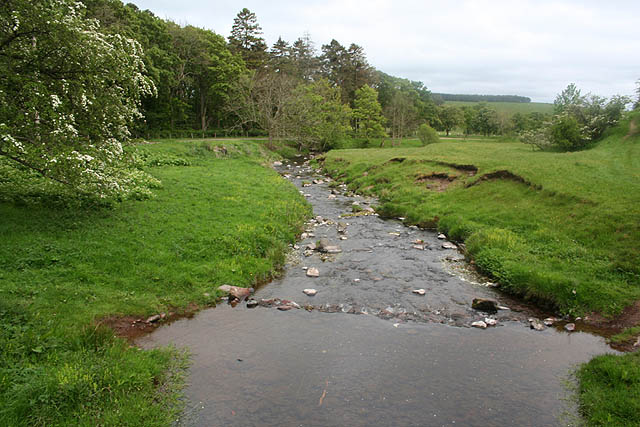
- River Alwin near Clennell

- Location within Northumberland

Location
- Country: United Kingdom
- County: Northumberland

Physical characteristics
- Mouth
  - coordinates: 55.3451°N 2.1257°W
- Basin size: 33.5 km^{2} (12.9 sq mi)
- Discharge
  - location: Clennell, Northumberland
  - average: 0.57 m^{3}/s (20 cu ft/s)

The River Alwin is a short, steep upland river that drains the Kidland Forest on the southern flanks of the Cheviot Hills, in the Northumberland National Park, England. It is a tributary of the River Coquet and 2.7 miles (4.3 km) in length.

== Course ==
Rising as the Outer Sike at the edge of the Kidland Forest between the peaks of Yarnspath Law and Bloodybush edge. It flows south through the forest gaining various burns and cloughs, to become the White Burn, until it reaches the confluence of the Yoke Burn, where it forms the River Alwin to the north of Kidlandlee.

From this point the river flows south to collect the Allerhope Burn at the edge of the forest, continuing through a steep sided valley before reaching Clennell Hall. It then passes to the south of Alwinton, finally reaching the hamlet of Low Alwinton where it joins the Coquet.

== Hydrology ==
Between 1969 and 1983 the flow of the Alwin, was measured in its lower reaches at a weir near Clennel. The fourteen year record shows that the catchment of 28 square kilometres (11 sq mi) to the gauging station yielded an average flow of 0.57 cubic metres per second (20 cu ft/s).

The catchment upstream of the station has an average annual rainfall of 1,003 millimetres (39.5 in) and a maximum altitude of 615 metres (2,018 ft) at Cushat Law. Land use is mostly forest with more than half of the catchment consisting of woodland, the remainder is grassland and moorland.

The River Alwin has been classed as having good ecological quality under the Water Framework Directive. This is one of the upper bands in the five part framework scale, which ranges from high, good, and moderate, through to poor and finally bad.

== See also ==
- List of rivers of England
