= Sharperton =

Coordinates: 55.326°N 2.072°W

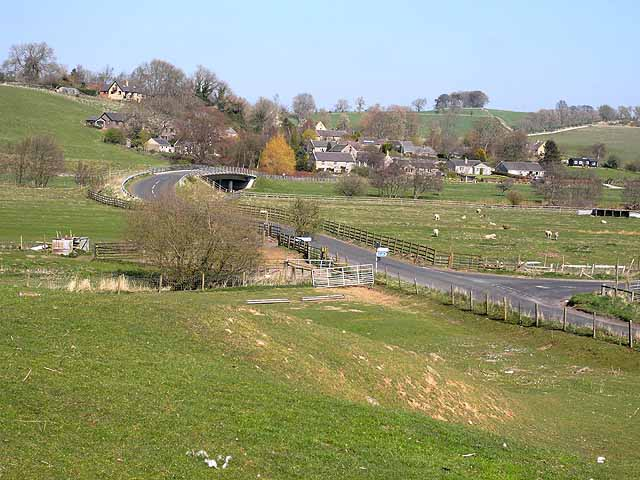

- Location within Northumberland
- OS grid reference: NT955035
- Civil parish: Harbottle
- Unitary authority: Northumberland
- Ceremonial county: Northumberland
- Region: North East
- Country: England
- Sovereign state: United Kingdom
- Post town: MORPETH
- Postcode district: NE65
- Dialling code: 01669
- Police: Northumbria
- Fire: Northumberland
- Ambulance: North East
- UK Parliament: North Northumberland

Sharperton is a small settlement and former civil parish, now in the parish of Harbottle, in Northumberland, England. Sharperton is the site of a deserted medieval village, which was documented as having 14 taxpayers in 1296, and described as having two short rows of dwellings in 1632. There was also a bastle (fortified farmhouse) here. In 1951 the parish had a population of 36.

== Governance ==
Sharperton is in the parliamentary constituency of Berwick-upon-Tweed. Sharperton was formerly a township in Alwinton parish, from 1866 Sharperton was a civil parish in its own right until it was abolished on 1 April 1955 and merged with Harbottle.
