= 1976 Alnwick District Council election =

1976 UK local government election

← 1973	6 May 1976	1979 →

All 28 seats to Alnwick District Council 15 seats needed for a majority
	First party	Second party
Party	Independent	Labour
Last election	25	3
Seats won	22	3
Seat change	▼3	Steady
Popular vote	15,582	4,161
Percentage	62.3%	16.6%
	Third party	Fourth party
Party	Conservative	Liberal
Last election	new	new
Seats won	2	1
Seat change	▲2	▲1
Popular vote	2,074	3,068
Percentage	8.3%	12.3%
Control of Council before election
Independent
Control of Council after election
Independent

Elections to Alnwick District Council were held on 6 of May 1976 alongside other local elections for Non-metropolitan district councils across England. Unlike the election of 1973, which was mainly fought between Independent politicians with a few wards being contested by Labour candidates, there were a few wards contested by Conservative and Liberal candidates this time around.

== Election result ==
Alnwick local election result 1976
Party	Seats	Gains	Losses	Net gain/loss	Seats %	Votes %	Votes	+/−
Independent	22	1	4	▼3	78.6	62.3	15,582	-19.7
Labour	3	2	2	Steady	10.7	16.6	4,161	-1.4
Conservative	2	2	0	▲2	7.1	8.3	2,074	new
Liberal	1	1	0	▲1	3.6	12.3	3,068	new
Ind. Labour Party	0	0	0	Steady	0.0	0.6	140	new

== Ward results ==
The result for each ward was as follows:

Harbottle
Party	Candidate	Votes	%	±%
Independent	J Coatsworth *	unopposed		
Independent hold				

Longframlington
Party	Candidate	Votes	%	±%
Independent	M Keen *	201	74.7	+19.6
Independent	Ditcham	68	25.3	
Majority		133	49.4	
Turnout		269	50.0	
Registered electors		538		
Independent hold				

No. 1 (Alnwick) (7)
Party	Candidate	Votes	%	±%
Independent	I Robertson *	1,547		
Independent	D Davidson *	1,126		
Independent	H Reavell *	1,121		
Liberal	R Simpson	1,104		
Independent	C Cookson	1,065		
Independent	C Oliver *	1,056		
Conservative	G Pope	930		
Independent	W Young	538		
Independent	Hopper	516		
Labour	J Wright	277		
Independent	Anderson	229		
Majority		421		
Turnout				
Registered electors		5,711		
Independent hold				
Independent hold				
Independent hold				
Liberal gain from Independent				
Independent gain from Independent				
Independent hold				
Conservative gain from Independent				

No. 2 (Amble) (5)
Party	Candidate	Votes	%	±%
Independent	T Straffen *	1,451	79.4	+30.1
Independent	C Turnbull *	1,164	63.7	+22.2
Conservative	A Rowell	1,144	62.6	+21.1
Independent	J Johnstone	1,080	59.1	
Labour	W Mitchell *	1,037	56.7	+6.1
Labour	J Gilgannon *	914	50.0	−0.8
Liberal	Riddell	710	38.8	
Independent	Portersdon	546	29.9	
Labour	Laidler	456	24.9	
Labour	Shinwell	342	18.7	
Labour	Arries	296	16.2	
Majority		287	15.7	
Turnout		1,828	49.7	
Registered electors		3,680		
Independent hold				
Independent hold				
Conservative gain from Labour				
Independent gain from Labour				
Labour hold				

No. 3 (Lesbury) (2)
Party	Candidate	Votes	%	±%
Independent	H Philipson *	663	78.8	+7.0
Independent	J Baxter *	543	64.6	−2.5
Liberal	W Robertson	267	31.7	−29.3
Liberal	Nutt	208	24.7	
Majority		120	14.3	
Turnout		841	69.6	
Registered electors		1,208		
Independent hold				
Independent hold				

No. 4 (Embleton)
Party	Candidate	Votes	%	±%
Independent	P Bridgeman *	362	56.1	+12.6
Liberal	Gaunt	283	43.9	
Majority		79	12.2	
Turnout		645	61.0	
Registered electors		1,058		
Independent hold				

No. 5 (Longhoughton)
Party	Candidate	Votes	%	±%
Independent	S Alexander	382	55.0	
Independent	R Huggins *	312	45.0	−7.8
Majority		70	10.1	
Turnout		694	62.9	
Registered electors		1,104		
Independent gain from Independent				

No. 6 (Shilbottle) (2)
Party	Candidate	Votes	%	±%
Labour	E Tully *	485	86.6	−2.4
Labour	W Dobbie	354	63.2	
Independent	W Tearney	140	25.0	−3.2
Independent Labour	J Swordly *	140	25.0	−3.8
Majority		131	23.4	
Turnout		560	45.1	
Registered electors		1,242		
Labour gain from Independent				
Labour gain from Independent				

No. 7 (Warkworth) (2)
Party	Candidate	Votes	%	±%
Independent	A Curry *	unopposed		
Independent	A Curry	unopposed		
Independent hold				
Independent gain from Independent				

No. 8 (Felton)
Party	Candidate	Votes	%	±%
Independent	K Ainsley *	unopposed		
Independent hold				

No. 9 (Edlingham)
Party	Candidate	Votes	%	±%
Independent	M Hill *	unopposed		
Independent hold				

No. 10 (Rothbury) (2)
Party	Candidate	Votes	%	±%
Independent	S Bolam	578	58.7	
Independent	R Mackie	458	46.5	
Independent	J Miller *	346	35.2	−31.3
Liberal	G France	317	32.2	
Liberal	Fairgrieve	179	18.2	
Independent	Chalk	90	9.1	
Majority		120	12.2	
Turnout		984	57.6	
Registered electors		1,709		
Independent gain from Independent				
Independent gain from Independent				

No. 11 (Whittingham)
Party	Candidate	Votes	%	±%
Independent	R Smith *	unopposed		
Independent hold				

No. 13 (Elsdon)
Party	Candidate	Votes	%	±%
Independent	R Elliott *	unopposed		
Independent hold				
