= 1995 Alnwick District Council election =

1995 UK local government election

An election for the Alnwick District Council was held on 4 May 1995. The Liberal Democrats won the most seats, although the council stayed under no overall control. The whole council was up for election, and turnout was 47.1%.

== Election result ==
Alnwick local election result 1995
Party	Seats	Gains	Losses	Net gain/loss	Seats %	Votes %	Votes	+/−
Liberal Democrats	11					37.7		-0.1
Labour	7					28.3		+7.3
Independent	7					18.5		+6.3
Conservative	4					15.8		-10.1

== See also ==
- Alnwick District Council elections
