= River Coquet =

River in Northumberland, England

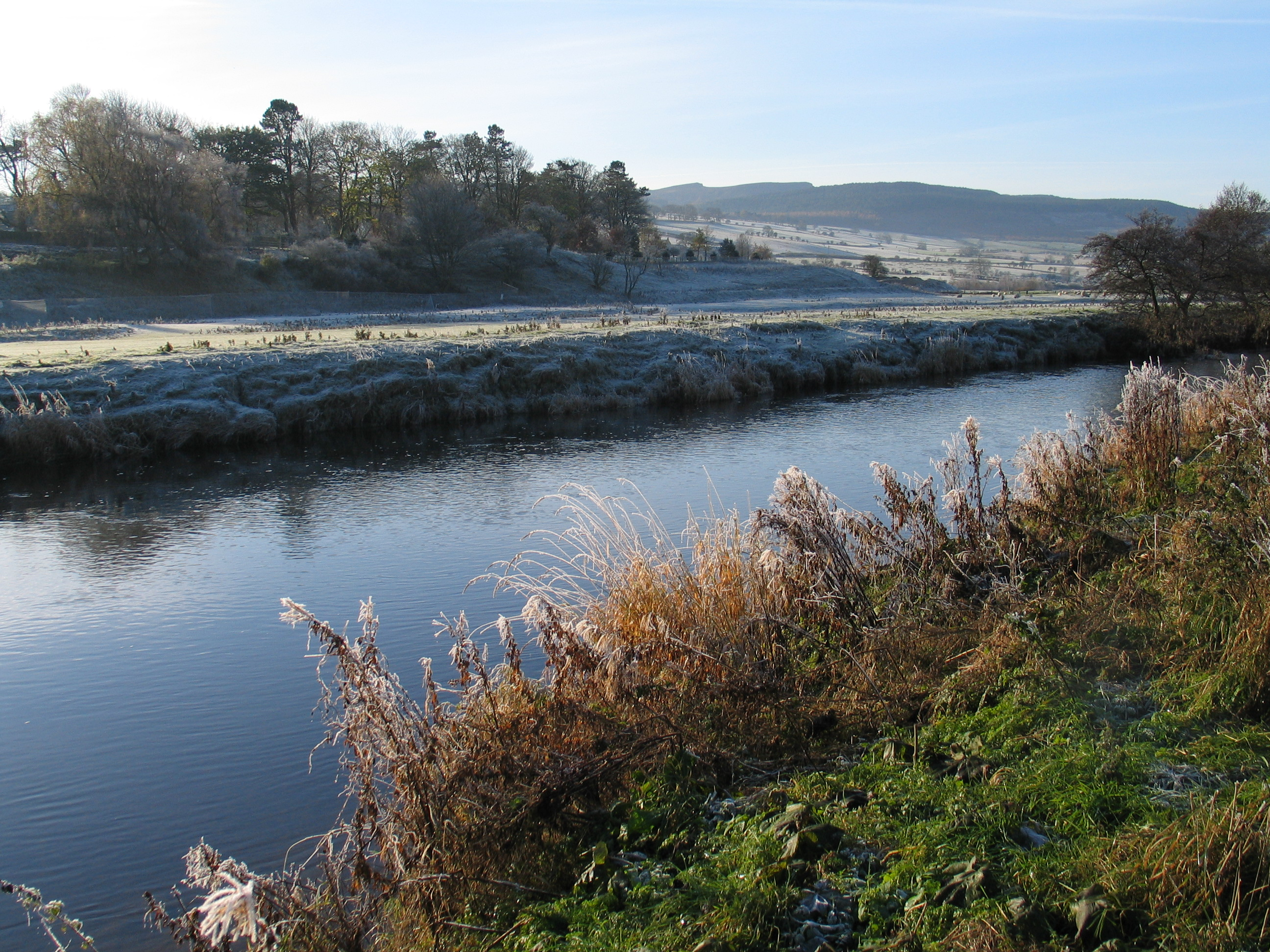
- River Coquet near Rothbury

Location
- Country: United Kingdom
- County: Northumberland

Physical characteristics
- Source
  - coordinates: 55.3625°N 2.3548°W
- Mouth
  - location: Amble
  - coordinates: 55.3393°N 1.5718°W
- Length: 90 km (56 mi)
- Basin size: 625 km^{2} (241 sq mi)
- Discharge
  - location: Morwick
  - average: 8.7 m^{3}/s (310 cu ft/s)

Map of Northumberland - showing the source and mouth

The River Coquet /ˈkoʊkət/ runs through the county of Northumberland, England, discharging into the North Sea on the east coast at Amble. It rises in the Cheviot Hills on the border between England and Scotland, and follows a winding course across the landscape ("Coquetdale"). The upper reaches are bordered by the Otterburn Ranges military training ground, and are crossed by a number of bridges built in the 20th century. It passes a number of small villages and hamlets, and feeds one of the lakes created by extraction of gravel that form the Caistron Nature Reserve, before reaching the town of Rothbury, where it is crossed by a grade II listed bridge. Below the town is Thrum Mill, a Grade II-listed water mill.

It loops around Brinkburn Priory, founded in the 1130s for Augustinian Canons, and its associated mill. At Felton it is crossed by two bridges, one dating from the 15th century, and its replacement, built in 1927, both of which are listed structures. Below the bridges is a sewage treatment works, built in the 1990s. At Brainshaugh, the river passes over a large horseshoe dam, built in 1775 by the engineer John Smeaton to power an iron and tin works, which later became a woollen mill, and subsequently one of the first factories to be powered by hydroelectricity. Before it reaches Warkworth, the river passes over another dam, which is now part of the intake works for Warkworth Water Treatment Works, which supplies drinking water to some 92,000 customers in the region. Below the dam the river is tidal, and Warkworth Castle is built in a loop of the Coquet. The river reaches the sea at Warkworth Harbour in Amble, where there is a Royal National Lifeboat Institution lifeboat station.

The river has been used as a source of power, as a number of mills have been constructed along its length. One of the earliest was on Hepden Burn, a tributary in the upper reaches, which was mentioned in the early 13th century, but was not subsequently developed, due to unrest in the area. Archaeological investigation between 2010 and 2013 revealed one of the few unaltered medieval mill sites in Britain, and pushed the development of the breast-shot water wheel back by three centuries. Although most of the mills were used for grinding corn, some were used for fulling of wool, and that at Brainshaugh for an industrial process. The earliest was at Warkworth, the rent from which was used to provide a light in St Cuthbert's shrine in 1214.

The earliest known reference to the River Coquet is found in the Ravenna Cosmography, which dates from the 8th century. The water quality of the non-tidal river is good ecologically, and only in the final tidal section is the water affected by run-off from agricultural land, reducing the quality to moderate.

== Course ==
The river, which is about 56 miles (90 km) in length, rises in the Cheviot Hills close to the 1,440-foot (440 m) contour, to the east of Grindstone Law and to the north of Ravens Knowe. The border between England and Scotland follows it briefly, before turning northwards at Chew Green, where there are the remains of Roman camps on the north bank of the river, the course of Dere Street, locally named as Camelspath, crosses the river, and there are the remains of the medieval village of Kemylpethe. The river continues in a north-easterly direction, where it is joined by Fulhope Burn, Buckham's Walls Burn, Blind Burn and Gable Burn, before it reaches Carshope plantation. It turns to the east, to be joined by Carlcroft Burn, Rowhope Burn and Hepden Burn, and after passing between Barrow Law to the north and Tindale Law to the south, the river turns to the south. The area to the south of the river forms part of the Otterburn Ranges, which has been used as a military training ground since 1911. It is owned by the Ministry of Defence, and public access is restricted.

The Deerbush Burn joins the Dumbhope Burn before they join the Coquet, and the river turns to the south-east, to be joined by Croft Sike and Pathlaw Sike, draining boggy areas to the south, while Usway Burn and Wholehope Burn drain hilly areas to the north. When it reaches the hamlet of Linbriggs, it is joined by the Ridlees Burn and turns to the east. At the village of Alwinton, the Barrow Burn, Hosedon Burn and River Alwin all converge, and the Coquet continues in a south-easterly direction through Harbottle, where there is a Neolithic enclosure and several Bronze Age cairns. At Sharperton, the ford was replaced by a bridge around 1896, since the bridge and a weir just downstream of it appears on the 1897 map, but a ford appears on the 1895 map. The bridge was rebuilt in 1920 using concrete beams, with six spans and parapets with latticework.

The upper Coquet above Alwinton is crossed by a number of bridges, all dating from a bridge-building programme in the 20th century, as prior to 1928, fords were the main means of crossing the channel on this section. Linbriggs Bridge was the first of the new bridges, and consists of a concrete arch spanning a 70-foot (21 m) gorge. Subsequent bridges were built with flat decks, and the programme was completed in 1968, when Mackendon Bridge was opened. The 1897 Ordnance Survey map shows three suspension bridges carrying footpaths over the river. There is one at Linbriggs, a second a short distance below Linbriggs and a third at Harbottle.

The Holystone Burn joins the Coquet at Holystone. The village has a Holy Well, with a rectangular stone tank dating from Roman times, but the fact that Bishop Paulinus baptized around 3000 Northumbrians there in the year 627 is now thought to be based on a misreading of the writings of Bede. The well is a grade I listed structure, and there is a Roman road which passed through the well enclosure and then crossed the Coquet on its way from High Rochester fort to the River Aln.

There was a fourth suspension bridge near Hepple, made of iron with a 90-foot (27 m) span, which cost £30 when it was constructed. By the time the river reaches Hepple bridge, which consists of modern steel beams resting on piers dating from around 1874, it has dropped below the 330-foot (100 m) contour. It turns to the north-east, and then passes the hamlet of Caistron, where there are two large lakes caused by extraction of sand and gravel, which started in 1956. The largest lake covers 50 acres (20 ha), and is managed as a nature reserve and fishery. Traffic from the quarry crossed a curious bridge, which consists of large metal tubes laid onto the bed of the river, above which the roadway has been constructed. The river channel has been engineered to make way for the quarrying, as it looped further to the south in 1925, and to the north-east of the first lake is a second smaller lake, fed by the river. Water supply to the upper lake is from Bickerton Burn.

=== Middle section ===
The river continues to the south of Thropton where Wreigh Burn joins from the north, and passes through Rothbury, where a bridge dating from the 16th century crosses it. Built as a packhorse bridge, it was made wider in 1759 by William Oliphant, a mason from Rothbury, to accommodate vehicles, and was further widened in the 20th century, when the parapets were removed and a concrete deck constructed on top of the original structure. Unlike many bridges, the earlier phases have not been concealed by later work. It is a scheduled monument and a grade II listed structure. Below Rothbury is a velocity-area gauging station, which measures the river's flow. Its accuracy is enhanced by a mill weir further downstream, and it has been used to collect flow data since 1972. The mean flow between 1972 and 2005 was 201 cubic feet per second (5.69 m^{3}/s), but the maximum flow during this period was 9,382 cu ft/s (265.7 m^{3}/s) on 1 April 1992. Just to the east is Thrum Mill, a grade II listed three-storey mill building dating from the 18th and 19th centuries the restoration of which was featured in the Channel 4 television programme The Restoration Man. From 1870 the Rothbury Branch of the Northumberland Central Railway ran along the south bank of the river on its final approach to Rothbury. Passenger services ceased in 1952 and goods services were withdrawn in 1963. The river continues through the hamlet of Pauperhaugh, where there is a bridge with three segmental arches and a weir on the downstream side. It then loops around a finger of land, which was given by its owner, William Bertram lord of Mitford, to Augustinian canons between 1130 and 1135, who founded Brinkburn Priory. After the dissolution of the monasteries, the main building was derelict until 1858, when it was re-roofed and partly rebuilt, to be used as a parish church. Parts of the original buildings were incorporated into a manor house, which was occupied intermittently until 1953, after which it was given to the Ministry of Public Building and Works. Both the church and the house are now managed by English Heritage and are open for public viewing. Nearby is Brinkburn Mill, built in the 18th century, but re-using medieval masonry. A cottage for the miller was added around 1830. The wheel and stones remain, although it is now used as holiday accommodation.

After passing through Weldon, where there is a mill and a three-arched bridge dating from 1760, which is thought to have been designed by the engineer John Smeaton, the Coquet is crossed by the A1 road. As it approaches Felton, there is a dam, from which a long rock-cut leat on the north bank supplied Felton corn mill. This was first mentioned in the 13th century, but the present building dates from the 18th and 19th centuries. An undershot water wheel drove four sets of stones, used for milling corn, while a second breast-shot wheel drove an oat mill, with two sets of stones, a rotary kiln and a pearl barley machine. There was once a sawmill powered by a third wheel. The site was operational until 1970, but was subsequently converted into homes, and the wheels were broken up. At Felton, the river turns to the north-east, and is crossed by two bridges. The first dates from the 15th century, and has three arches. It was widened in the 19th and 20th centuries, but was disused after 1927, when a new concrete bridge by Considere Constructions, also with three spans, was built to replace it. It is grade II listed because it is one of the earliest bridges of its type produced by the company. Beyond the bridges, a new sewage treatment works was built on the north bank, after it was authorised in 1991. It was designed to discharge 19,000 cubic feet (539 m^{3}) of treated effluent to the river each day, and replaced old inefficient works at Felton, Longframlington, Swarland and Thirston.

Near Brainshaugh, the river passes over a horseshoe dam, built in 1775 by John Smeaton for John Archbold of Acton and Edward Cook of Brainshaugh. It is built of squared stone, and was repaired and modified in 1926. The downstream face is vertical, and the water falls 8 feet (2.4 m). The curved dam has a radius of 170 feet (51.8 m) and supplied a mill race to the south of the river. This originally powered an iron and tin foundry, subsequently converted to a woollen mill in 1791, and becoming derelict in 1884. From 1915, it was used to manufacture a white pigment called Hydrate of Alumina, and became one of the first factories in the country to be powered by hydroelectric power when a Gilkes water turbine was fitted into the millrace. The factory closed in 1930 when its lease was not renewed following pollution of the river. The mill building was converted into flats in 1968. At the eastern end of the site is Factory Bridge, consisting of three segmental arches, which was built of rock-faced stone in 1865. Some railings were added in the 20th century.

=== Lower River ===
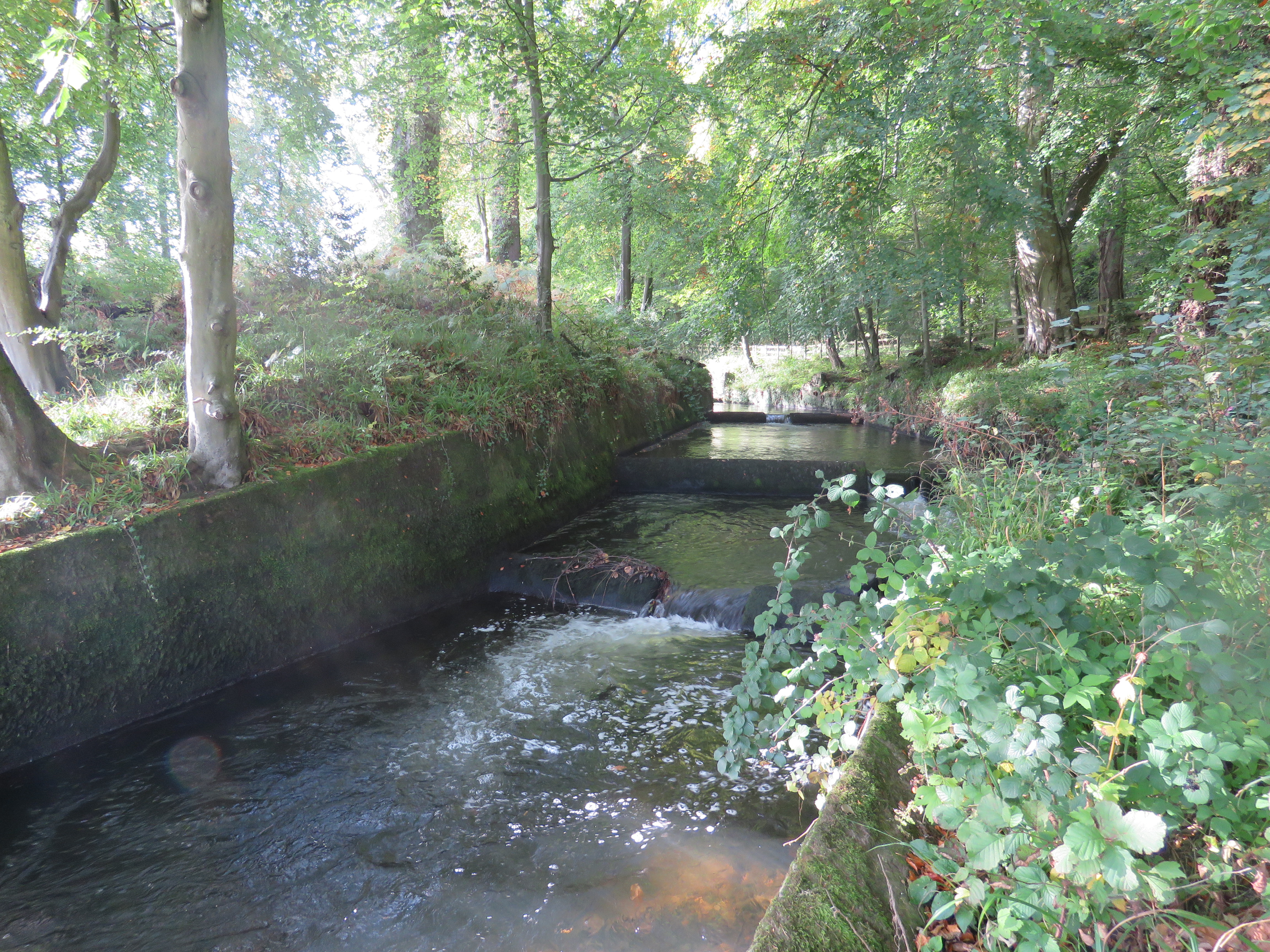
Warkworth fish pass was refurbished in 2013 after 20 years of dereliction

Further downstream near Guyzance are the ruins of Brainshaugh Priory, which was established by Richard Tison around 1147 for Premonstratensian nuns. The community had disbanded by 1500, but the chapel remains, and is a grade II* listed structure. Another large dam provided the water supply for Guyzance Mill, on the west bank of the river. The main building has three storeys, and the undershot water wheel is located inside the building, although it may have been external when first built. Some of the machinery and the stones remain in situ. The East Coast Main Line crosses the river on a railway viaduct with nine arches, designed in Robert Stephenson and completed in 1849 or 1850. The river passes over the weir of Morwick Mill, and a little further downstream is Morwick gauging station, which has been collecting data since 1963. It uses velocity area technology, and there is a 112-foot (34 m) wide concrete weir, which dates from 1973. The station replaced one at Guyzance, and while the measurements are good for most of the year, they are briefly inaccurate when the Morwick Mill weir is drained and flushed once a year. Mean flow between 1963 and 2005 was 303 cubic feet per second (8.58 m^{3}/s), with a high of 12,913 cu ft/s (365.7 m^{3}/s) on 1 April 1992. Just to the west of Warkworth the river passes over a large weir, beyond which the water is tidal. The weir is bypassed by a fish pass, consisting of a series of pools with small jumps between them. The fish pass was refurbished in 2013 after lying derelict for 20 years, to prevent harm to salmon, sea trout and eels, which were being injured while trying to negotiate the main weir. On the south bank is Warkworth Water Treatment Works, which takes 9.2 million imperial gallons (42 Ml) of water from the river each day to supply potable water to 92,000 customers in Alnwick, Morpeth, Ashington and the surrounding areas. A £2.2 million upgrade to the plant was completed in 2015.

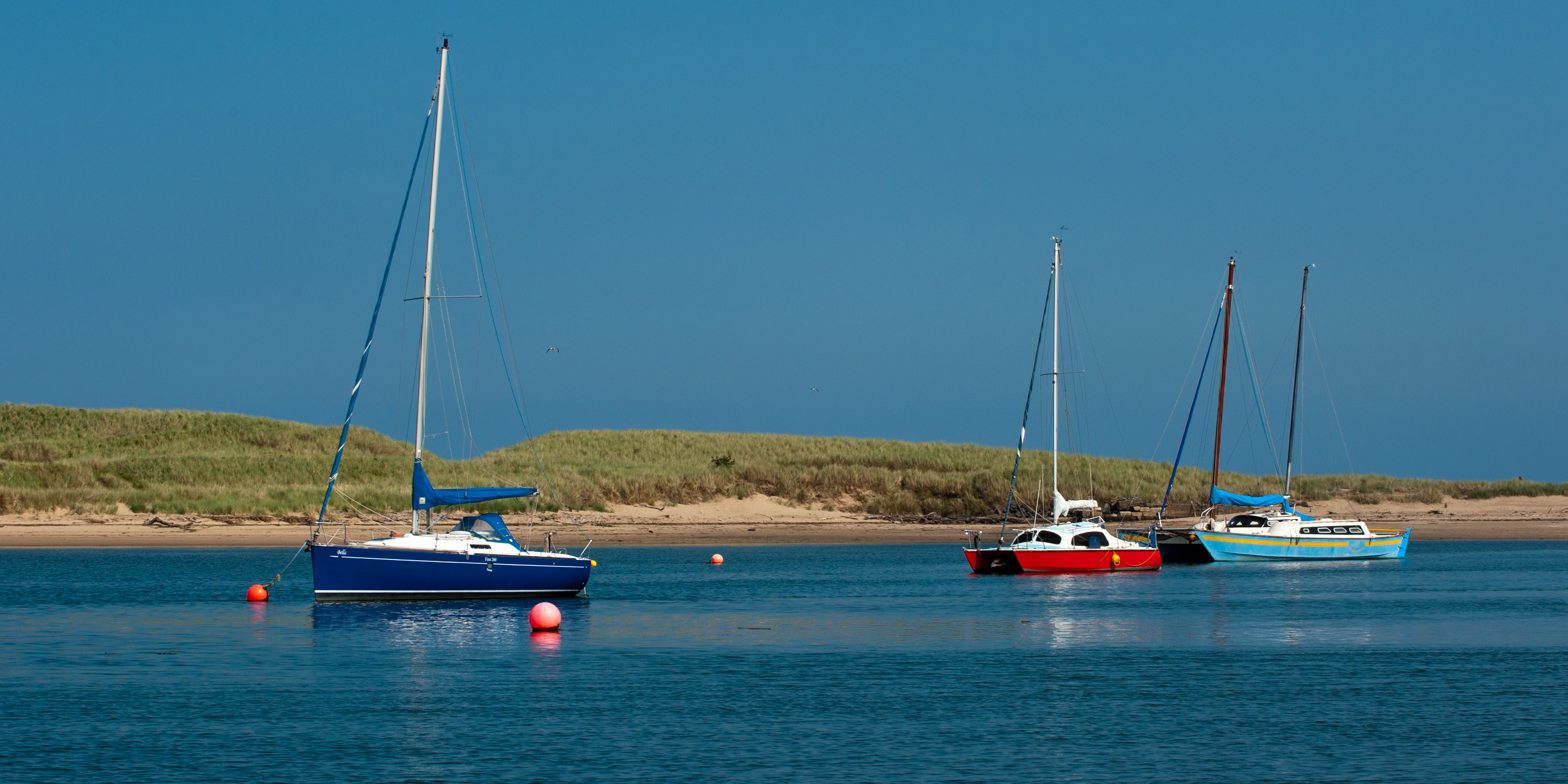
The estuary of the River Coquet in Amble

On the north bank below the weir is a cave hermitage, which dates from the 14th and early 15th centuries. It was abandoned by 1567, but remains one of the best preserved and elaborate monuments of its type in the British Isles, and is a grade I listed structure. On the tidal section, a loop to the north encloses the centre of Warkworth, including its medieval castle and church. Below Warkworth is Amble half-tide weir, which maintains water levels through Warkworth when the tide is low, but is submerged at high tide. It has a central notch and a fish pass near the southern bank. In 2018, the flow through the notch was decreased, and that down the fish pass increased, as fish tended to use the notch, where they were caught in large numbers by seals. Below the weir the channel widens to form Warkworth Harbour, with the town of Amble on the south bank. There is a marina and a Royal National Lifeboat Institution lifeboat station, which houses two lifeboats, a Shannon-class all-weather boat propelled by water jets, and a D-class inflatable boat for inshore work. The crew have received 18 awards for gallantry between them, including the first ever awarded for a rescue by an inshore boat. Finally the river enters the North Sea, almost opposite Coquet Island, located 1 mile (1.6 km) out to sea.

== Mills ==
For most of England, the Domesday Book which was produced in 1086 provides the first comprehensive survey of mills, but the Domesday survey did not cover Northumberland or County Durham, and so documentary records for the Coquet are not available from that period. The first known records are from the 12th century, when water mills were normally owned by the Lord of the Manor or by Religious establishments. While most mills were used for grinding corn, they were also employed in the fulling of wool. This process, which removed grease and other impurities from the woollen fabric and knitted the fibres together to form a denser product, was a manual one until the 12th century, with the cloth put into tubs and trampled by foot, before it was washed in a stream. The fulling mill used a rotating shaft with cams to raise and drop mallets onto the cloth, which was immersed in tubs. The Newminster Chartulary, which records the activities of a Cistercian abbey near Morpeth lists two fulling mills on the Coquet, including one between Rowhope Burn and Hepden Burn. This is thought to have been on the Hepden Burn, a tributary which was known as Barrow Burn in 1866, and the mill site is now known as Barrowburn. Archaeological investigation of the site was carried out between 2010 and 2013 by members of Coquetdale Community Archaeology.

As some time between 1226 and 1245, the monks of Newminster Abbey were granted a licence to erect a fulling mill at Barrowburn. They also built dykes to mark the boundaries of the land they had been given. It is not clear how long the mill was operational, as there are no further documentary records, and the area was turbulent with Scottish incursions in the 14th century, which may have contributed to its demise, but the site of the mill was identified by Dippie Dixon in 1903. The archaeological investigations found the remains of a wheel pit for a breast-shot water wheel, and a wooden structure in the river bed which was probably part of a sluice. The wheel was unusual, since documentary evidence for breast-shot wheels begins in the 16th century, but the finds push their history back by three centuries. The unrest in the area may have had unexpected consequences, as the site was never developed subsequently, and is one of very few medieval mill sites to be excavated in Britain.

Barrow Mill was a corn mill located upstream of Alwinton, and was first documented in 1712. It is shown with a large weir, a sluice feeding a mill race, and an exit leat on an 1895 map, but only the buildings are shown by 1897. It was built on lands owned by Holystone Priory, and appears to have been disused by 1887. Although there is no evidence from early Ordnance Survey maps for further mills above Rothbury, there were two mills at Alwinton in 1623, one of which may have been a fulling mill, as a fulling mill was confiscated from Sir Edward Widdrington in 1654. Widdrington also lost a corn mill and a fulling mill at Harbottle, which were sold in 1655, but later recovered following the Restoration. There were two mills at Holystone, a corn mill which was mentioned when Holystone Nunnery was dissolved in 1539, and Holystone Walk Mill, both of which are shown on a map dating from 1765. A fulling mill at Caistron was the other mill on the Coquet mentioned in the Newminster Chartulary, and there was at least one mill at Tosson, as a corn mill was documented in 1290 and 1436, but a fulling mill was mentioned in 1622.

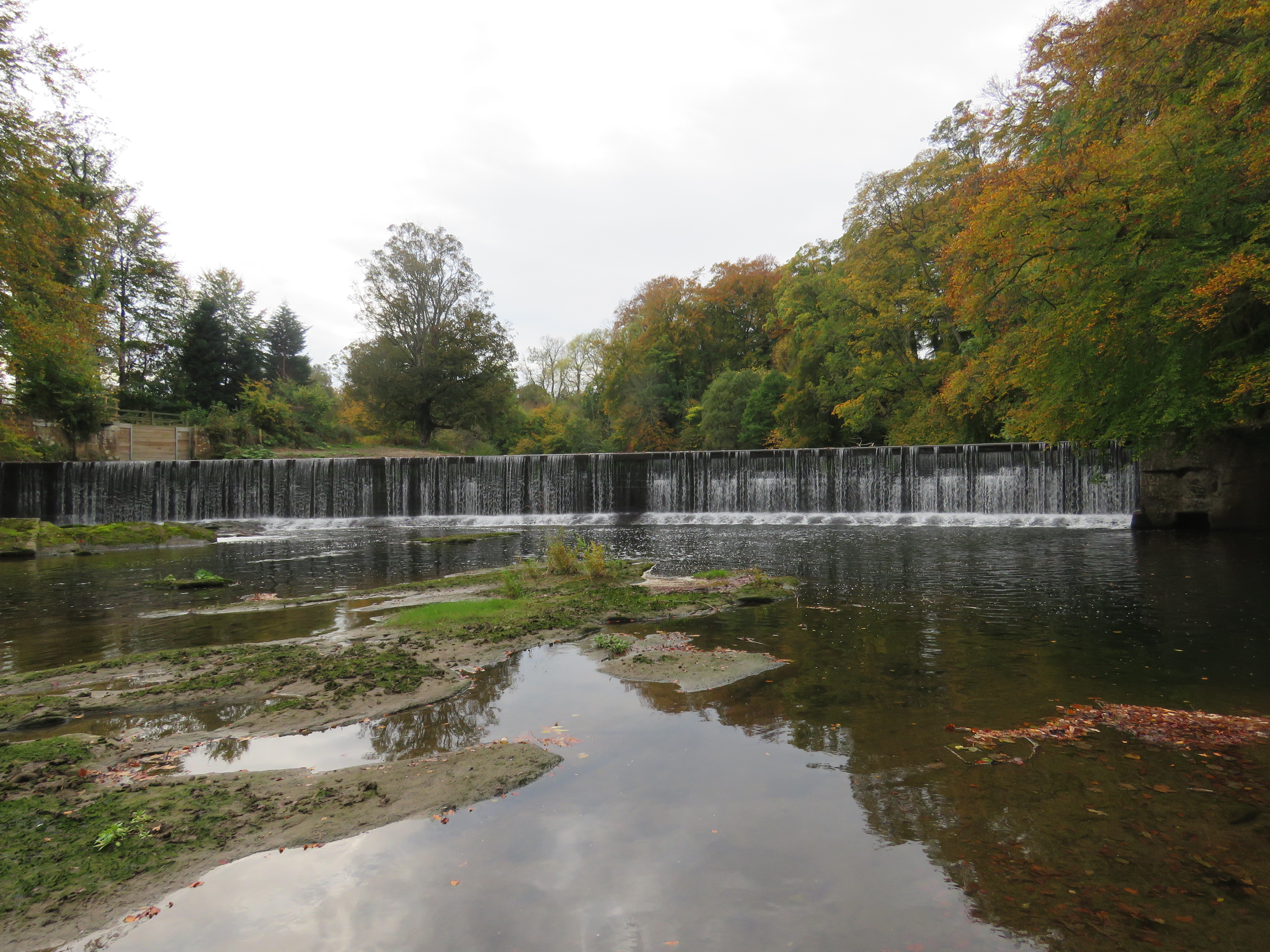
John Smeaton's weir at Guyzance fed an iron and tin works when first built.

There were four mills at various times in Rothbury. Debdon Mill was a woollen mill on the Debdon Burn, and was first documented in 1762. It was shown on the Ordnance Survey map of 1879, but not on that of 1897. East Mill was a corn mill of unknown date, located just upstream from the site of Thrum Mill. Thrum Mill itself is known to have existed before 1841, while Little Mill dates from 1827, and was located just below the confluence with Whitton Burn. Both were corn mills. Brinkburn Mill, which was owned by Brinkburn Priory, was documented in 1535, and although its main function was grinding corn, it may also have been used to generate electricity in the 20th century. Wheldon Mill was another corn mill first documented in 1668. It was just upstream of Wheldon Bridge, and the downstream mill race rejoined the river below the bridge. At Felton, there is a mill upstream of the bridges, which was operational until 1970, and another just below the bridge, of which there is no trace.

Smeaton's dam at Guyzance fed the iron and tin works, which was later converted to a woollen mill, producing blankets. Guyzance Mill was a corn mill further downstream, which may have been used as a fulling mill in its early days. It is first attested to in 1336. There was also a corn mill on the Hazon Burn, which joins the Coquet just below Smeaton's weir. Hazon Mill was near the hamlet of Hazon, and was documented in the 16th century. Morwick Mill, on the outskirts of Warkworth, was a corn mill first documented in 1284. The weir is still extant, and the modern map shows a mill cottage, but not the mill itself. Warkworth Mill was one of the earliest on the river, as the rent from it was used to provide a light in St Cuthbert's shrine in 1214, and this was still the arrangement in 1400. Two mills were recorded at the site in 1567 and 1607, while the last record of rents being collected was in 1855. The building was damaged by fire in 1860, and was probably not used afterwards. A number of buildings remain, although not the mill building, while the weir has been incorporated into the intake works for Warkworth Water Treatment Works. There were also two mills on Grange Burn, a tributary that joins the Coquet above Warkworth Mill site. Grange Mill was near the medieval village of Low Buston, and Houndean Mill was just to the east of the railway bridge over the burn.

== History ==
The earliest known reference to the River Coquet is found in the 8th century Ravenna Cosmography, where it is known as Coccuueda. Bede referred to Cocuedi fluminis. This can be roughly translated to 'Red River', perhaps reflecting the red porphyritic pebbles found here in large numbers. Alternatively, a recent emerging theory proposes the river took its name in the Anglo-Saxon period after an area of land between the Coquet and river Wansbeck called the "Cocwudu" meaning "cock wood", with the river therefore taking its name via a process of back-formation.

The area provides the background to William Gibson's poem The Sailor or the Coquet Cottage. This and other poems, some in the Scottish dialect, were published in 1828. Copies of this very rare book are in the British Library and also in the Duke of Northumberland's library at Alnwick Castle.

== Water quality ==
The Environment Agency measure the water quality of the river systems in England. Each is given an overall ecological status, which may be one of five levels: high, good, moderate, poor and bad. There are several components that are used to determine this, including biological status, which looks at the quantity and varieties of invertebrates, angiosperms and fish. Chemical status, which compares the concentrations of various chemicals against known safe concentrations, is rated good or fail.

The water quality of the River Coquet system was as follows in 2019.

Section	Ecological Status	Chemical Status	Length	Catchment	Channel
Coquet from Source to Usway Burn	Good	Fail	10.0 miles (16.1 km)	24.11 square miles (62.4 km^{2})	
Coquet from Usway Burn to Holystone Burn	Good	Fail	7.8 miles (12.6 km)	8.07 square miles (20.9 km^{2})	
Coquet from Holystone Burn to Forest Burn	Good	Fail	15.1 miles (24.3 km)	24.51 square miles (63.5 km^{2})	
Coquet from Forest Burn to Tidal Limit	Good	Fail	19.4 miles (31.2 km)	25.33 square miles (65.6 km^{2})	
Coquet estuary	Moderate	Fail			heavily modified

The reasons for the tidal section being less than good are physical modification of the channel and run-off of nutrients from agricultural land. Like most rivers in the UK, the chemical status changed from good to fail in 2019, due to the presence of polybrominated diphenyl ethers (PBDE), perfluorooctane sulphonate (PFOS) and mercury compounds, none of which had previously been included in the assessment.

== See also ==
- Usway Burn
- River Alwin
- Rivers of the United Kingdom
- Bridges On the Coquet

== Bibliography ==
- Carlton, Richard; Jones, David (2014). "A medieval fulling mill at Barrowburn on the River Coquet: evidence and context". Archaeologia Aeliana. doi:10.5284/1061292. Archived from the original on 24 November 2023.
- Fitzpatrick-Matthews, Keith J (5 August 2013). "Britannia in the Ravenna Cosmography". Academia.edu.
- Frodsham, Paul (2006). In the Valley of the Sacred Mountain: An Introduction to Prehistoric Upper Coquetdale (1st ed.). Northern Heritage. ISBN 978-0-9544777-5-2.
- Jones, David (2012). "Barrowburn Mill" (PDF). Archaeology in Northumberland. Coquetdale Community Archaeology / Northumberland County Council.
- Marsh, Terry; Hannaford, Jamie (2008). UK Hydrometric Register (PDF). Natural Environment Research Council. ISBN 978-0-9557672-2-7.
- Roberts, Martin (2003). Brinkburn Priory. English Heritage. ISBN 978-1-85074-848-9.
