= 2003 Alnwick District Council election =

2003 UK local government election

Results of the 2003 Alnwick District Council election, including the subsequent by-election in Rothbury and South Rural

An election for the Alnwick District Council was held on 1 May 2003. The whole council was up for election and the council stayed under no overall control. One of the three seats in the Rothbury and South Rural ward had no candidate for the seat - a subsequent by-election on 12 June was won by an independent candidate.

== Election result ==
Alnwick local election result 2003
Party	Seats	Gains	Losses	Net gain/loss	Seats %	Votes %	Votes	+/−
Independent	14			+3	48.3	53.7	5,487	
Liberal Democrats	10			-3	34.5	30.0	3,062	
Conservative	3			+1	10.3	4.1	420	
Labour	2			0	6.9	11.6	1,184	
UKIP	0			0	0.0	0.6	63	

5 Liberal Democrat, 2 Conservative and 1 Independent candidates were unopposed.

== Ward results ==
Alnwick Castle (3)
Party	Candidate	Votes	%	±%
Liberal Democrats	David Archer	unopposed		
Liberal Democrats	Alastair Graham	unopposed		
Liberal Democrats	Kevin Thompson	unopposed		

Alnwick Clayport (2)
Party	Candidate	Votes	%	±%
Liberal Democrats	Kenneth Gray	295		
Liberal Democrats	Eileen Blakey	231		
Conservative	Karl Poulsen	29		
Turnout		555	20.7	

Alnwick Hotspur (2)
Party	Candidate	Votes	%	±%
Independent	Gordon Castle	403		
Independent	John Wright	245		
Liberal Democrats	Elizabeth Willa	183		
Labour	Louis Levi	116		
Turnout		947	31.7	

Amble Central (2)
Party	Candidate	Votes	%	±%
Independent	Audrey Jones	299		
Labour	Elizabeth Gray	231		
Liberal Democrats	Teresa Hedley	191		
Independent	Thomas Evans	124		
Turnout		845	30.0	

Amble East (2)
Party	Candidate	Votes	%	±%
Labour	George Arckless	363		
Liberal Democrats	John Hedley	228		
Independent	George Smailes	117		
Conservative	Rebecca Poulsen	61		
Turnout		769	27.2	

Amble West (2)
Party	Candidate	Votes	%	±%
Independent	Henry Stewart	277		
Independent	Carl Oliver	253		
Liberal Democrats	Ian Hinson	229		
Labour	Christopher Rollo	153		
Turnout		912	33.0	

Embleton
Party	Candidate	Votes	%	±%
Liberal Democrats	Lydia Cairns	246	56.4	
Independent	June Burnie	190	43.6	
Majority		56	12.8	
Turnout		436	55.4	

Harbottle and Elsdon
Party	Candidate	Votes	%	±%
Conservative	Susan Bolam	unopposed		

Hedgeley
Party	Candidate	Votes	%	±%
Independent	John Taylor	unopposed		

Lesbury (2)
Party	Candidate	Votes	%	±%
Independent	Hugh Philipson	595		
Conservative	John Orde	330		
Liberal Democrats	Robert Vass	275		
Turnout		1,200	51.5	

Longframlington
Party	Candidate	Votes	%	±%
Conservative	Trevor Thorne	unopposed		

Longhoughton with Craster and Rennington (2)
Party	Candidate	Votes	%	±%
Liberal Democrats	Carol Grey	353		
Independent	Ann Glass	294		
Independent	Thomas Spence	211		
Turnout		858	38.9	

Rothbury and South Rural (3)
Party	Candidate	Votes	%	±%
Liberal Democrats	Peter Dawson	unopposed		
Liberal Democrats	Andrew Duffield	unopposed		
	No candidate			

Shilbottle (3)
Party	Candidate	Votes	%	±%
Independent	Maria Haddow	614		
Independent	Vera Vaggs	559		
Liberal Democrats	Susan Rickwood	445		
Labour	Mary Dixon	321		
Independent	Eric Thomason	311		
Turnout		1,618	40.2	

Warkworth (2)
Party	Candidate	Votes	%	±%
Independent	Susan Champion	472		
Independent	Jeffrey Watson	326		
Liberal Democrats	John Elliott	323		
Turnout		1,121	38.8	

Whittingham
Party	Candidate	Votes	%	±%
Independent	John Rutherford	197	61.0	
UKIP	Ian Dodds	63	19.5	
Liberal Democrats	Noel Peberdy	63	19.5	
Majority		134	41.5	
Turnout		323	39.6	
