= Burradon, Northumberland =

Village in Northumberland, England

Coordinates: 55.353°N 2.025°W

Burradon
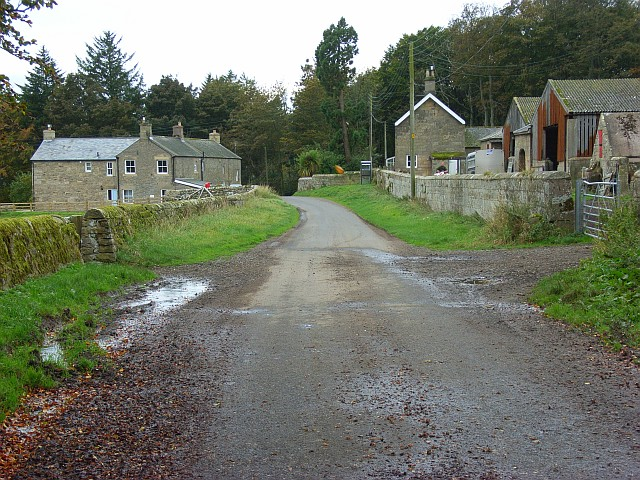

- Location within Northumberland
- OS grid reference: NT985065
- Civil parish: Netherton
- Unitary authority: Northumberland
- Shire county: Northumberland
- Region: North East
- Country: England
- Sovereign state: United Kingdom
- Post town: MORPETH
- Postcode district: NE65
- Police: Northumbria
- Fire: Northumberland
- Ambulance: North East
- UK Parliament: North Northumberland

Burradon is a village and former civil parish, now in the parish of Netherton, in Northumberland, England. It is about 14 miles (23 km) to the south-west of Alnwick. In 1951 the parish had a population of 53.

== Governance ==
Burradon is in the parliamentary constituency of Berwick-upon-Tweed. Burradon was formerly a township in Alwinton parish, from 1866 Burradon was a civil parish in its own right until it was abolished on 1 April 1955 and merged with Netherton.
