= Netherton, Northumberland =

Village in Northumberland, England

Coordinates: 55.362888°N 2.021268°W

Netherton
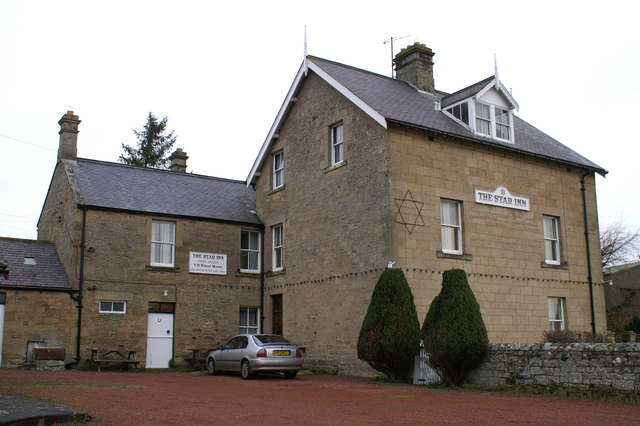
- The Star Inn, Netherton

- Location within Northumberland
- Population: 185 (2011 Census)
- Civil parish: Netherton
- Unitary authority: Northumberland
- Shire county: Northumberland
- Region: North East
- Country: England
- Sovereign state: United Kingdom
- Post town: Morpeth
- Postcode district: NE65
- Police: Northumbria
- Fire: Northumberland
- Ambulance: North East
- UK Parliament: North Northumberland

Netherton is a village and civil parish in the English county of Northumberland. The population of the village at the 2011 census was 185.

Located 6 1/2 miles (10.5 km) northwest of the town of Rothbury Netherton is close to the Anglo-Scottish border. Historically it was part of the parish of Alwinton of which it formed the townships of Netherton Northside and Netherton Southside. Also in the civil parish are the settlements of Netherton Burnfoot at grid reference NT995072 and Burradon at NT981061.

The village's public house, the Star Inn, has its interior included in the National Inventory of Historic Pub Interiors by CAMRA. It was listed in the first 40 editions of the CAMRA Good Beer Guide from 1974 until 2013, being one of only 7 pubs to achieve this.

There is a First School (Now Closed).
