= Clennell, Northumberland =

Village in Northumberland, England

Coordinates: 55.361°N 2.1198°W

Clennell
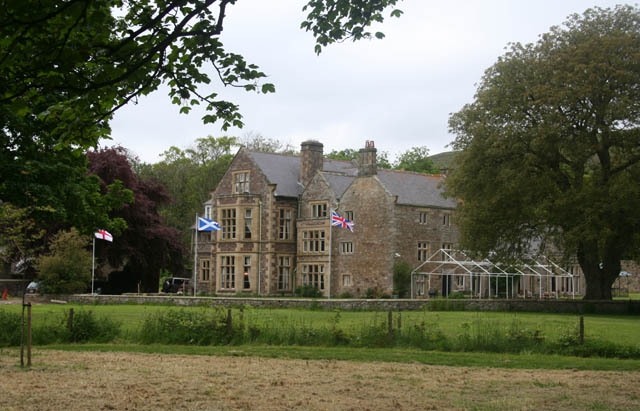
- Clennell Hall

- Location within Northumberland
- OS grid reference: NT925075
- Civil parish: Alwinton
- Unitary authority: Northumberland
- Shire county: Northumberland
- Region: North East
- Country: England
- Sovereign state: United Kingdom
- Post town: MORPETH
- Postcode district: NE65
- Police: Northumbria
- Fire: Northumberland
- Ambulance: North East
- UK Parliament: Berwick-upon-Tweed

Clennell is a small village and as Clennel, a former civil parish, now in the parish of Alwinton, in Northumberland, England. It is about 1 mile (1.6 km) north-east of Alwinton. In 1951 the parish had a population of 37.

== Governance ==
Clennell is in the parliamentary constituency of Berwick-upon-Tweed. Clennell was formerly a township in Alwinton parish, from 1866 Clennel was a civil parish in its own right until it was abolished on 1 April 1955 and merged with Biddlestone.
