= 1999 Alnwick District Council election =

1999 UK local government election

An election for the Alnwick District Council was held on 6 May 1999. The whole council was up for election with boundary changes since the last election in 1995, increasing the number of seats by 1. The council stayed under no overall control.

== Election result ==
Alnwick local election result 1999
Party	Seats	Gains	Losses	Net gain/loss	Seats %	Votes %	Votes	+/−
Liberal Democrats	13			+1	43.3			
Independent	13			+4	43.3			
Labour	2			-4	6.7			
Conservative	2			0	6.7			
