= Harbottle Castle =

Ruined castle in Northumberland, England

- Northumberland, England, UK
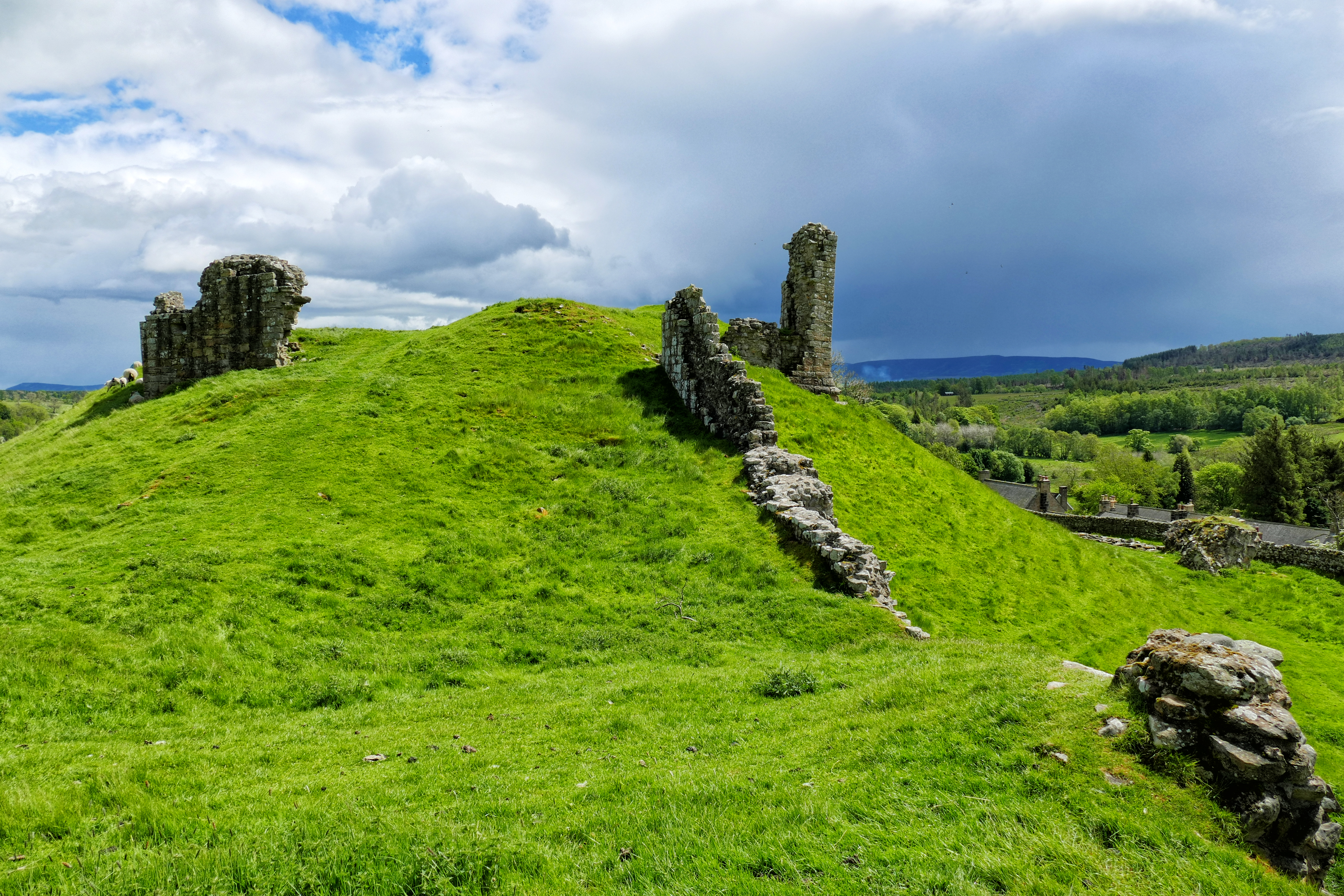
- Ruins of Harbottle Castle

Location
- Location in Northumberland
- Coordinates: 55.337°N 2.109°W
- Grid reference: NT932048

Harbottle Castle is a ruined medieval castle situated at the west end of the village of Harbottle, Northumberland, England, 9 miles (14 km) west-north-west of Rothbury overlooking the River Coquet. It is a Scheduled Ancient Monument and a Grade I listed building.

It is thought that the mound on which the keep stands was a site used by the ancient Britons, and that in Anglian times, there was a stronghold on the site held by Mildred, son of Ackman. The present castle was built about 1160 by the Umfraville family at the request of King Henry II on land awarded to them following the Norman Conquest, presumably as a defence against the Scots.

Not long after its erection, in 1174, it was taken by the Scots and was then rebuilt more strongly. In 1296, it was besieged by Robert de Ros, and some 40,000 men, but the siege by the supporters of John Balliol was withstood. In the 1310s, Robert the Bruce captured the castle. It was restored in 1336, but was in ruins again by 1351. It was repaired at the end of the 14th century, and in about 1436 the castle passed into the hands of the Tailleboys. It was for a long time the residence of the Warden of the Middle Marches and used as a prison.

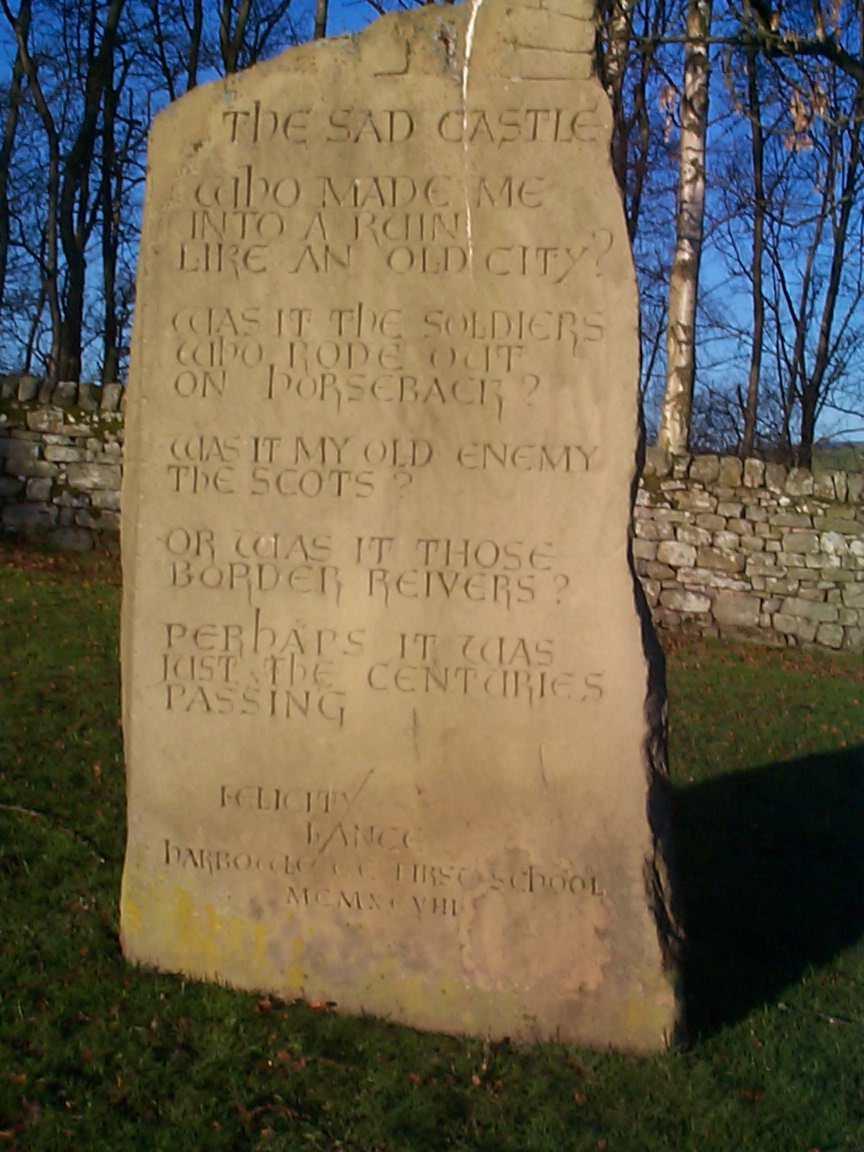
A child's poem about the castle set in stone

In 1515, Margaret Tudor, the widowed queen of King James IV of Scotland and sister of King Henry VIII of England, having been banished by the regent, John Stewart, Duke of Albany, came to the castle with her second husband, Archibald Douglas, 6th Earl of Angus. There, their daughter was born, who was also called Margaret. Margaret Douglas was to become the mother of Lord Darnley, the second husband of Mary, Queen of Scots, and grandmother of King James VI of Scotland and I of England.

Further building work took place between 1541 and 1551 and more repairs were made in 1563 and in 1585. The castle became a royal property in 1546, and repairs were supervised by Sir John Forster, warden of the Middle Marches. According to a survey made in 1596, Forster had built a new gatehouse and a tower that served as a lodging for the captain.

In 1605, King James I granted the castle and manor to George Home, 1st Earl of Dunbar, Lord Treasurer of Scotland, but thereafter, the castle fell into decay and much of its masonry was used in other buildings. A survey of 1715 reported the castle to be ruinous once more. Today, only earthworks and some standing masonry remains. The site is run by the Northumberland National Park Authority and entry to it is free.

Confusingly, following the abandonment of the castle as a residence, the name Harbottle Castle was reused as follows:

- Harbottle Castle (grid reference NT93234796) is also the name of a 19th-century mansion house situated at the east end of Harbottle village.

Stone from the derelict medieval castle was used in the building of a 17th-century manor house. The manor was acquired by Percival Clennell in 1796, and in 1829, the house was replaced on the site with a two-storied five-bayed mansion designed by architect John Dobson for Fenwick Clennell. The house is protected with Grade II listed building status. The stable block was converted into a separate house in 1890.

== Photos of castle ruins ==
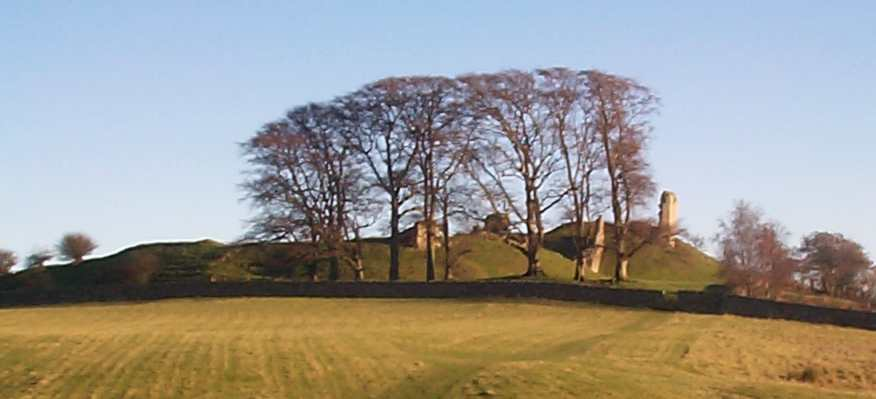

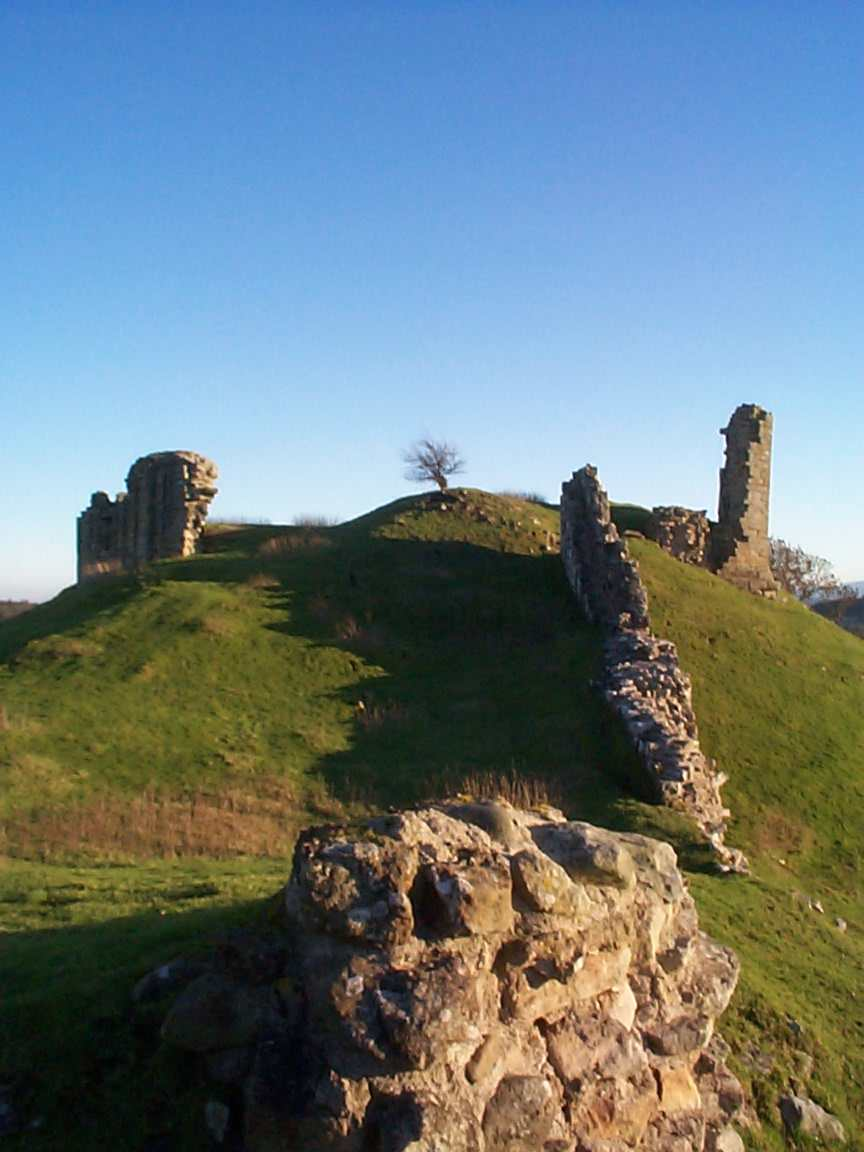

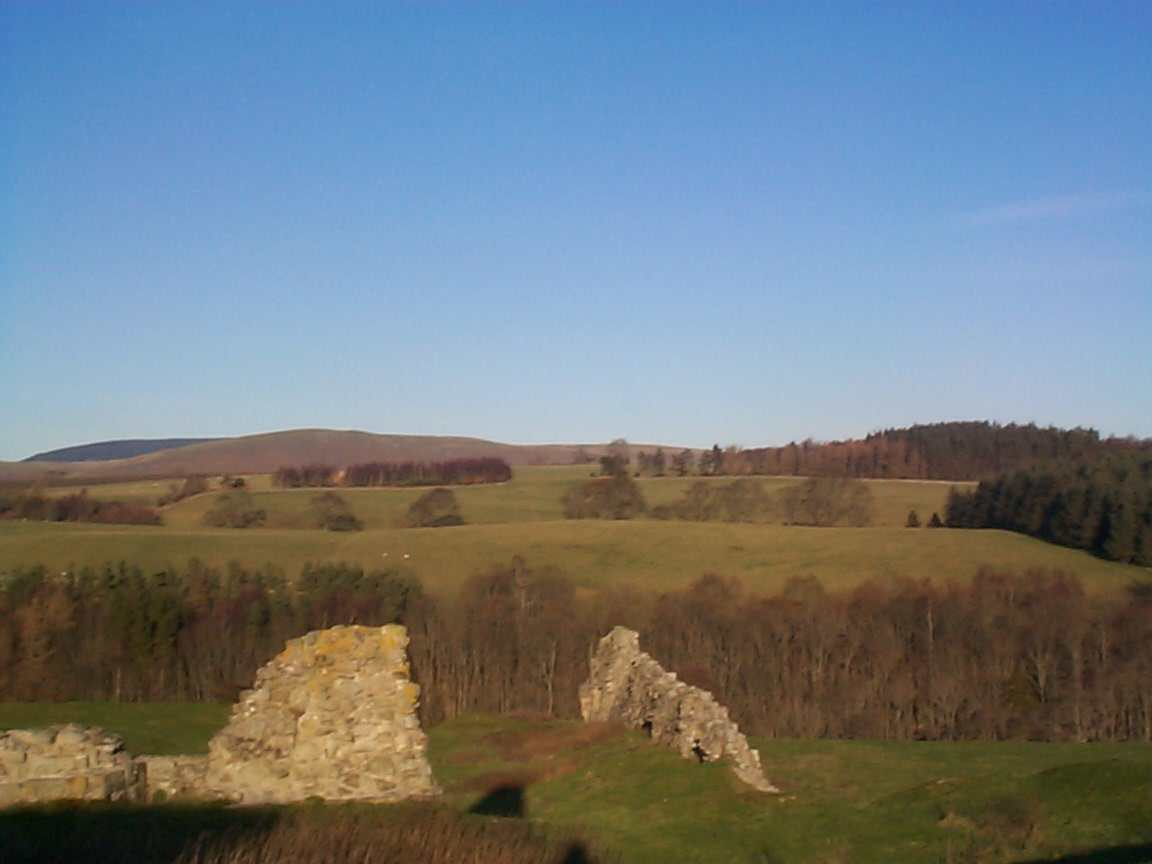

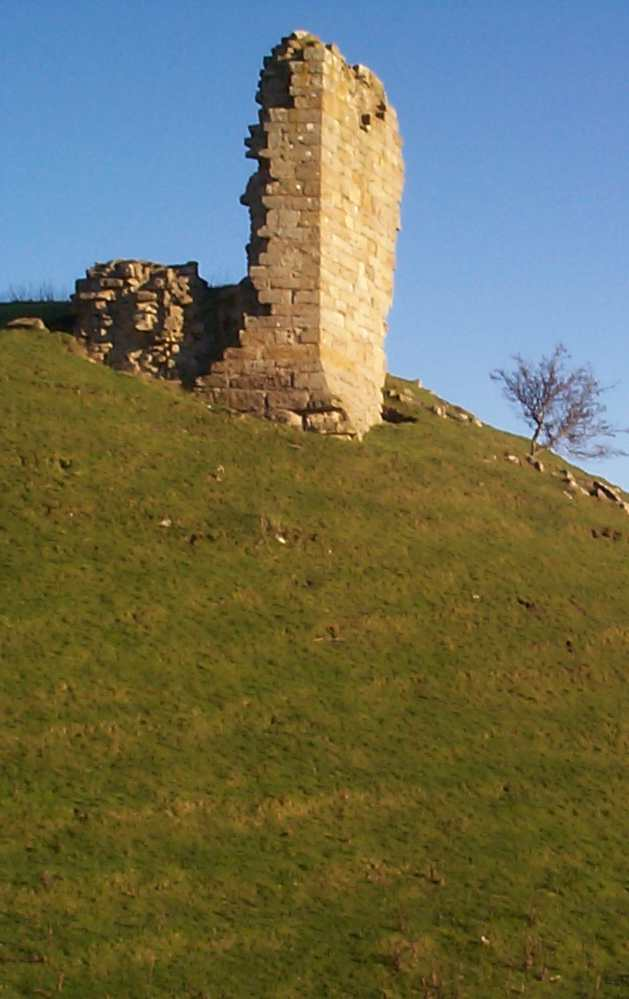
