= Harbottle =

Village in Northumberland, England

Coordinates: 55.336°N 2.106°W

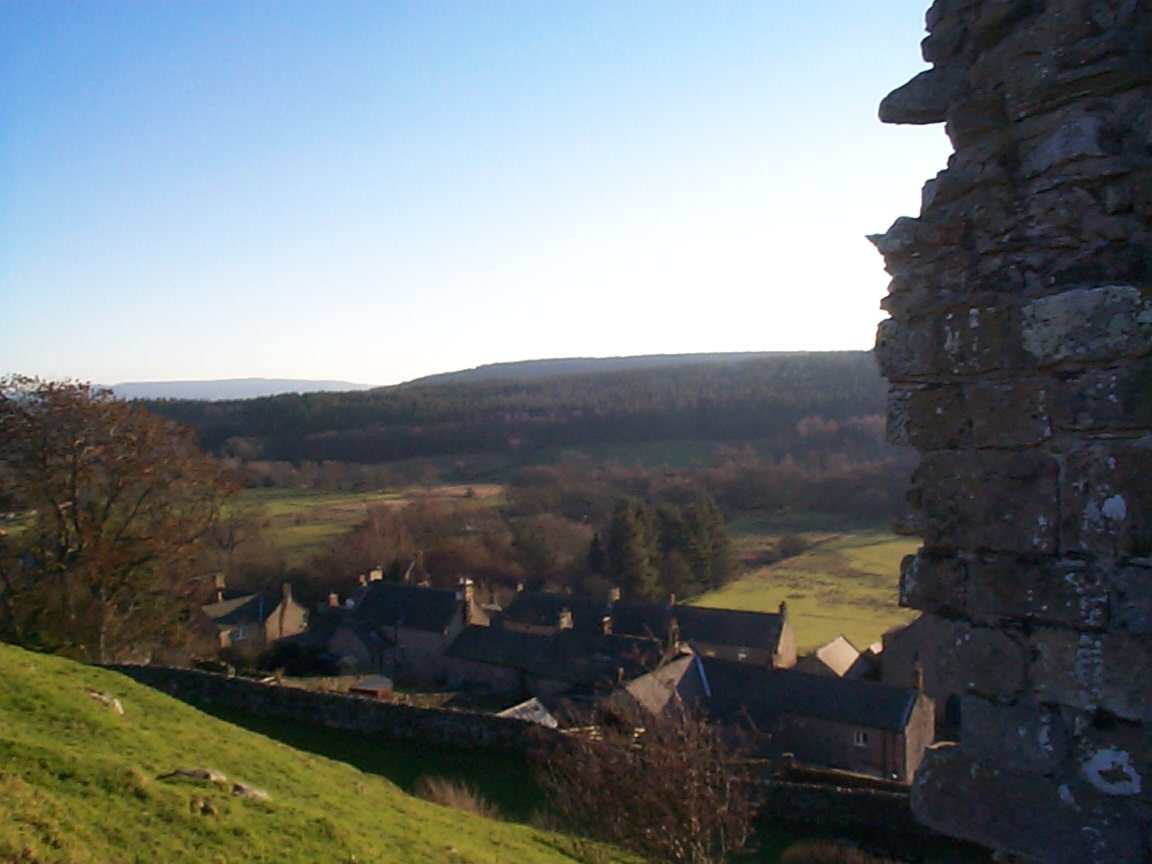
- View of the village from Harbottle Castle

- Location within Northumberland
- Population: 256 (2011 census)
- OS grid reference: NT934046
- Unitary authority: Northumberland
- Ceremonial county: Northumberland
- Region: North East
- Country: England
- Sovereign state: United Kingdom
- Post town: MORPETH
- Postcode district: NE65
- Dialling code: 01669
- Police: Northumbria
- Fire: Northumberland
- Ambulance: North East
- UK Parliament: North Northumberland

Harbottle is a village and civil parish in Northumberland, England about 10 miles (16 km) south-east of the Scottish border, in the southeastern part of the Cheviot Hills and inside Northumberland National Park. The village is the site of Harbottle Castle built by order of Henry II. Now in ruins, the castle was constructed by the Umfraville family to protect against invaders from Scotland.

== Landmarks ==
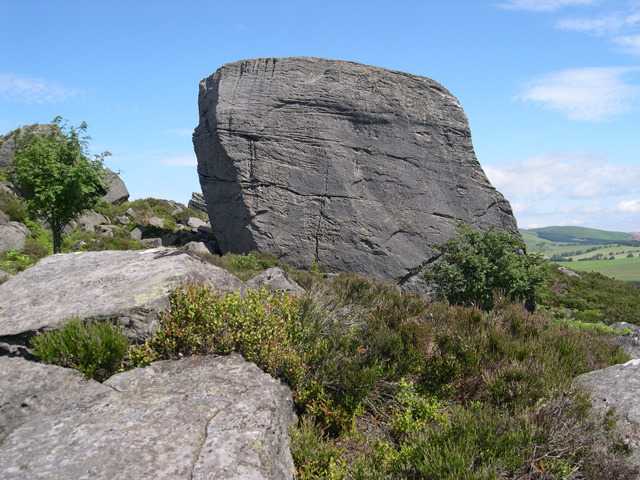
The Drake Stone near Harbottle

Harbottle Castle is a ruinous medieval castle dated to the 12th century, situated at the west end of the village overlooking the River Coquet. It is a Scheduled Ancient Monument and a Grade I listed building. It is open to the public without charge.

The Drake Stone stands prominently on the hills surrounding Harbottle. The massive sandstone boulder, believed in times past to be endowed with supernatural powers, is a detached sandstone block of Fell Sandstone, which has moved very little from the Fell Sandstone outcrop within which it lies. It has been compared to the Bowder Stone in Borrowdale, Cumbria, which has also not been moved far. Harbottle Lake is situated just behind the Drake Stone.

Harbottle has a single small public house, The Star Inn, which incorporates a village shop and pizzeria.

== See also ==
- Harbottle Castle
- Alwinton
