= Grade I listed buildings in Northumberland =

Northumberland shown within England

There are over 9000 Grade I listed buildings in England. This page is a list of these buildings in the county of Northumberland, generally by parish.

== Northumberland ==
Name	Location	Type	Completed (Note: The date given is the date used by Historic England as significant for the initial building or that of an important part in the structure's description.)	Date designated	Grid ref. (Note: The grid reference is based on the British national grid reference system, sometimes known as OSGB36, used by the Ordnance Survey.) Geo-coordinates	Entry number (Note: The "List Entry Number" is a unique number assigned to each listed building and scheduled monument by Historic England.)	Image
Church of St Michael	Alnham, Northumberland	Church	Saxon	21 October 1953	NT9908610993; 55°23′34″N 2°00′58″W	1303455	Church of St Michael More images
Canongate Bridge	Alnwick, Northumberland	Bridge	1821	20 February 1952	NU1809914002; 55°25′11″N 1°42′56″W	1041491	Canongate Bridge More images
Church of St Michael	Alnwick, Northumberland	Church	c. 1464	25 August 1977	NU1838613703; 55°25′01″N 1°42′40″W	1041546	Church of St Michael More images
Denwick Bridge (that part in Alnwick Parish)	Alnwick, Northumberland	Bridge	1766	10 January 1953	NU1975013813; 55°25′04″N 1°41′22″W	1042043	Denwick Bridge (that part in Alnwick Parish) More images
Denwick Bridge (that part in Denwick Parish)	Denwick, Northumberland	Bridge	1765	20 February 1952	NU1975013814; 55°25′04″N 1°41′22″W	1371329	Denwick Bridge (that part in Denwick Parish) More images
Northumberland Hall (Assembly Rooms)	Alnwick, Northumberland	Public Hall	1826	20 February 1952	NU1864613283; 55°24′47″N 1°42′25″W	1041460	Northumberland Hall (Assembly Rooms) More images
Percy Tenantry Column	Alnwick, Northumberland	Column	1816	20 February 1952	NU1914613037; 55°24′39″N 1°41′57″W	1041405	Percy Tenantry Column More images
Alnwick Castle, the Stable Court and Riding School	Alnwick, Northumberland	Castle	1138	20 February 1952	NU1868513574; 55°24′57″N 1°42′23″W	1371308	Alnwick Castle, the Stable Court and Riding School More images
Bondgate Tower	Alnwick, Northumberland	Gate	c. 1450	20 February 1952	NU1885513229; 55°24′45″N 1°42′13″W	1041513	Bondgate Tower More images
Lion Bridge (that part in Alnwick Parish)	Alnwick, Northumberland	Bridge	1773	10 January 1953	NU1861913813; 55°25′04″N 1°42′27″W	1178596	Lion Bridge (that part in Alnwick Parish) More images
Lion Bridge (that part in Denwick Parish)	Alnwick, Denwick, Northumberland	Bridge	1773	10 January 1953	NU1862113820; 55°25′05″N 1°42′27″W	1304367	Lion Bridge (that part in Denwick Parish) More images
Town Hall	Alnwick, Northumberland	Town Hall	1731	20 February 1952	NU1860713314; 55°24′48″N 1°42′28″W	1157140	Town Hall More images
Bothal Castle Gatehouse and adjacent Wing to West	Bothal, Ashington, Northumberland	Castle	c. 1343	14 April 1949	NZ2398586520; 55°10′21″N 1°37′30″W	1153715	Bothal Castle Gatehouse and adjacent Wing to West More images
Bothal Castle Remains of Curtain Wall to South of Residential Block	Bothal, Ashington, Northumberland	Castle	1343	14 April 1949	NZ2401786464; 55°10′19″N 1°37′28″W	1041365	Bothal Castle Remains of Curtain Wall to South of Residential Block
Church of St Andrew	Bothal, Ashington, Northumberland	Church	13th century	18 December 1986	NZ2398986621; 55°10′24″N 1°37′30″W	1371383	Church of St Andrew More images
Bamburgh Castle	Bamburgh, Northumberland	Castle	12th century, 18th/19th century reconstruction	4 January 1952	NU1831935114; 55°36′33″N 1°42′39″W	1280155	Bamburgh Castle More images
Church of St Aidan	Bamburgh, Northumberland	Church	12th century	22 December 1969	NU1784934968; 55°36′29″N 1°43′06″W	1042269	Church of St Aidan More images
Church of St Cuthbert	Beltingham, Bardon Mill, Northumberland	Church	12th century	24 November 1967	NY7896463963; 54°58′11″N 2°19′48″W	1370817	Church of St Cuthbert More images
Willimontswick Gatehouse and adjacent Ranges	Willimontswick, Bardon Mill, Northumberland	House	16th century	24 November 1967	NY7706463645; 54°58′01″N 2°21′35″W	1370843	Willimontswick Gatehouse and adjacent Ranges More images
Belford Hall	Belford, Belford, Northumberland	House	1754-56	22 December 1969	NU1109934240; 55°36′06″N 1°49′31″W	1233314	Belford Hall More images
Church of St Cuthbert	Bellingham, Northumberland	Church	13th century	10 November 1951	NY8376783252; 55°08′36″N 2°15′22″W	1370442	Church of St Cuthbert More images
Belsay Castle	Belsay, Northumberland	Castle	1614	27 August 1952	NZ0847578554; 55°06′05″N 1°52′07″W	1042837	Belsay Castle More images
Belsay Hall	Belsay, Belsay, Northumberland	House	1810-1817	27 August 1952	NZ0883578363; 55°05′59″N 1°51′47″W	1304489	Belsay Hall More images
Church of St Andrew	Bolam, Northumberland	Church	Late Saxon	28 April 1969	NZ0924782602; 55°08′16″N 1°51′23″W	1304102	Church of St Andrew More images
Shortflatt Tower	Shortflatt, Belsay, Northumberland	Tower	17th century	27 August 1952	NZ0793780995; 55°07′24″N 1°52′38″W	1042821	Shortflatt Tower More images
Bitchfield Tower	West Bitchfield, Belsay, Northumberland	Tower	14th century	27 August 1952	NZ0907877061; 55°05′16″N 1°51′34″W	1303894	Bitchfield Tower More images
Remains of Berwick Town Walls and Bell Tower	Berwick-upon-Tweed, Northumberland	Wall	Elizabethan	26 May 1971	NT9978553526; 55°46′30″N 2°00′18″W	1370858	Remains of Berwick Town Walls and Bell Tower More images
Berwick Town Walls, Cowport Gate	Cowport, Berwick-upon-Tweed, Northumberland	Gate		26 May 1971	NU0013153174; 55°46′19″N 1°59′58″W	1042478	Berwick Town Walls, Cowport Gate More images
Berwick Town Walls, Scotsgate	Berwick-upon-Tweed, Northumberland	Gate	Elizabethan	26 May 1971	NT9969453077; 55°46′16″N 2°00′23″W	1370836	Berwick Town Walls, Scotsgate More images
Berwick Town Walls, Shore Gate	Berwick-upon-Tweed, Northumberland	Gate	1760	26 May 1971	NT9985852644; 55°46′02″N 2°00′14″W	1233671	Berwick Town Walls, Shore Gate More images
Berwick Bridge	Berwick-upon-Tweed, Northumberland	Bridge	1611-34	1 August 1952	NT9955652704; 55°46′04″N 2°00′31″W	1041695	Berwick Bridge More images
Berwick Castle Constable Tower ruins	Berwick-upon-Tweed, Northumberland	Tower	13th century	1 August 1952	NT9940653338; 55°46′24″N 2°00′40″W	1371223	Upload Photo
Berwick Castle fragments, including towers, walls and steps	Berwick-upon-Tweed, Northumberland	Castle	After 1611	1 August 1952	NT9932853410; 55°46′26″N 2°00′44″W	1290213	Berwick Castle fragments, including towers, walls and steps More images
Berwick castle, wall to the north of the ruins of the Constable Tower	Berwick-upon-Tweed, Northumberland	Castle		26 May 1971	NT9941053348; 55°46′24″N 2°00′40″W	1041696	Upload Photo
Church of Holy Trinity	Berwick-upon-Tweed, Northumberland	Church	1648-52	1 August 1952	NU0003653199; 55°46′20″N 2°00′04″W	1233676	Church of Holy Trinity More images
Berwick Barracks Gateway and Guard House	Berwick-upon-Tweed, Northumberland	Gate	1719-1721	26 May 1971	NU0009053115; 55°46′17″N 2°00′00″W	1244721	Berwick Barracks Gateway and Guard House More images
Berwick Barracks East Barrack	Berwick-upon-Tweed, Northumberland	Barracks	1721	26 May 1971	NU0012653080; 55°46′16″N 1°59′58″W	1042432	Berwick Barracks East Barrack More images
Berwick Barracks West Barrack	Berwick-upon-Tweed, Northumberland	Wall	1719-1721	26 May 1971	NU0007653072; 55°46′16″N 2°00′01″W	1244722	Berwick Barracks West Barrack More images
Berwick Barracks Clock House building	Berwick-upon-Tweed, Northumberland	Barracks	Late 19th century	26 May 1971	NU0008953043; 55°46′15″N 2°00′01″W	1244772	Berwick Barracks Clock House building More images
Premises occupied by Card Shop, Town House Coffee House and Boutique	Berwick-upon-Tweed, Northumberland	Shop	1971	26 May 1971	NT9992452897; 55°46′10″N 2°00′10″W	1042466	Premises occupied by Card Shop, Town House Coffee House and Boutique
Royal Border Bridge	Berwick-upon-Tweed, Northumberland	Bridge	1847	1 August 1952	NT9928553252; 55°46′21″N 2°00′47″W	1211052	Royal Border Bridge More images
The Custom House	Berwick-upon-Tweed, Northumberland	House	18th century	26 May 1971	NT9988252626; 55°46′01″N 2°00′12″W	1042437	The Custom House More images
Town Fortifications including the Bell Tower	Berwick-upon-Tweed, Northumberland	Wall	1760s	26 May 1971	NU0022152855; 55°46′09″N 1°59′53″W	1290222	Town Fortifications including the Bell Tower More images
Town Hall	Berwick-upon-Tweed, Northumberland	Town hall	1754-60	1 August 1952	NT9991452901; 55°46′10″N 2°00′11″W	1290051	Town Hall More images
Church of Holy Trinity	Old Bewick, Bewick, Northumberland	Church	12th century	21 September 1951	NU0680022149; 55°29′35″N 1°53′38″W	1042412	Church of Holy Trinity More images
Abbey Gatehouse with Post Office	Blanchland, Northumberland	Abbey	15th century	18 June 1986	NY9656950369; 54°50′53″N 2°03′18″W	1153918	Abbey Gatehouse with Post Office
Church of St Mary	Blanchland, Northumberland	Church	1165	15 April 1969	NY9662650400; 54°50′54″N 2°03′15″W	1304226	Church of St Mary More images
Churchyard Cross 17m West of Door of Church of St. Mary	Blanchland, Northumberland	Cross	13th century	18 June 1986	NY9659850408; 54°50′54″N 2°03′16″W	1045418	Churchyard Cross 17m West of Door of Church of St. Mary More images
House adjacent to Abbey Gatehouse	Blanchland, Northumberland	House	13th century	14 April 1969	NY9656350366; 54°50′53″N 2°03′18″W	1370257	House adjacent to Abbey Gatehouse
Brinkburn Priory	Brinkburn, Northumberland	Church	16th century	21 October 1953	NZ1159398324; 55°16′44″N 1°49′09″W	1303969	Brinkburn Priory More images
Weldon Bridge over River Coquet and Wall to North West	Weldon Bridge, Brinkburn, Northumberland	Wall	c. 1760	10 January 1953	NZ1379698511; 55°16′50″N 1°47′04″W	1371161	Weldon Bridge over River Coquet and Wall to North West More images
Bywell Castle Gatehouse	Bywell, Northumberland	Gatehouse	Early 15th century	15 April 1969	NZ0494261784; 54°57′02″N 1°55′28″W	1370558	Bywell Castle Gatehouse More images
Church of St Andrew	Bywell, Northumberland	Church	Saxon	15 April 1969	NZ0483961492; 54°56′53″N 1°55′34″W	1044831	Church of St Andrew More images
Church of St Peter	Bywell, Northumberland	Church	Pre-Conquest	15 April 1969	NZ0492661428; 54°56′51″N 1°55′29″W	1044828	Church of St Peter More images
Callaly Castle	Callaly, Northumberland	House	14th century	21 October 1953	NU0527009879; 55°22′58″N 1°55′06″W	1155463	Callaly Castle More images
Capheaton Hall and Walls attached	Capheaton, Northumberland	House	1668	27 August 1952	NZ0389980497; 55°07′08″N 1°56′25″W	1154285	Capheaton Hall and Walls attached More images
East Shaftoe Hall	Shaftoe, Capheaton, Northumberland	House	16th century	27 August 1952	NZ0590781797; 55°07′50″N 1°54′32″W	1154609	East Shaftoe Hall More images
Cragside	Cartington, Northumberland	House	1864	21 October 1953	NU0737502173; 55°18′49″N 1°53′07″W	1042076	Cragside More images
Cartington Castle ruins	Cartington, Northumberland	Castle	Late 16th or early 17th century	21 October 1953	NU0388104533; 55°20′05″N 1°56′25″W	1042073	Cartington Castle ruins More images
Weetwood Bridge	Weetwood, Chatton, Northumberland	Bridge	16th century	21 September 1951	NU0185529466; 55°33′32″N 1°58′20″W	1042383	Weetwood Bridge More images
Chillingham Castle	Chillingham, Northumberland	Castle	14th century	21 September 1951	NU0615025784; 55°31′33″N 1°54′15″W	1042387	Chillingham Castle More images
Church of St Peter	Chillingham, Northumberland	Church	12th century	21 September 1951	NU0621325959; 55°31′38″N 1°54′11″W	1232739	Church of St Peter More images
Chapel at Chipchase Castle	Chipchase, Chollerton, Northumberland	Chapel	Medieval	5 September 1985	NY8836075697; 55°04′32″N 2°11′02″W	1044897	Chapel at Chipchase Castle More images
Chipchase Castle	Chipchase, Chollerton, Northumberland	Castle	14th century	20 October 1952	NY8825775731; 55°04′33″N 2°11′08″W	1155161	Chipchase Castle More images
Church of St Giles	Chollerton, Northumberland	Church	12th century	15 April 1969	NY9310871917; 55°02′30″N 2°06′34″W	1155271	Church of St Giles More images
Aydon Castle Main Buildings and Courtyard Walls	Aydon, Corbridge, Northumberland	House	c. 1280	24 May 1988	NZ0014366283; 54°59′28″N 1°59′57″W	1303707	Aydon Castle Main Buildings and Courtyard Walls More images
Dislton Hall Chapel	Dilston, Corbridge, Northumberland	Chapel	Early 17th century	15 April 1969	NY9757463253; 54°57′50″N 2°02′22″W	1303600	Dislton Hall Chapel More images
Church of St Andrew	Corbridge, Northumberland	Church	Late 7th or 8th century	15 April 1969	NY9883364433; 54°58′28″N 2°01′11″W	1303508	Church of St Andrew More images
Corbridge Bridge	Corbridge, Northumberland	Bridge	1674	15 April 1969	NY9888864173; 54°58′20″N 2°01′08″W	1044808	Corbridge Bridge More images
Dilston Castle	Corbridge, Northumberland	House	c. 1630	15 April 1969	NY9755363286; 54°57′51″N 2°02′23″W	1044775	Dilston Castle More images
Low Hall	Corbridge, Northumberland	House	Late 16th century	20 October 1952	NY9912864321; 54°58′25″N 2°00′55″W	1044784	Low Hall More images
Outer Bailey Walls and attached Farm buildings	Aydon, Corbridge, Northumberland	Privy House	14th century	24 May 1988	NZ0010866291; 54°59′28″N 1°59′59″W	1044803	Outer Bailey Walls and attached Farm buildings
Vicars Pele	Corbridge, Northumberland	Tower	c. 1400	15 April 1969	NY9885064408; 54°58′27″N 2°01′10″W	1044750	Vicars Pele More images
Twizell Bridge	Cornhill-on-Tweed, Northumberland	Bridge	Later additions	22 December 1969	NT8848443310; 55°40′59″N 2°11′05″W	1042199	Twizell Bridge More images
Dunstanburgh Castle	Dunstanburgh, Craster, Northumberland	Castle	Early 14th century	31 December 1969	NU2568421798; 55°29′22″N 1°35′42″W	1153477	Dunstanburgh Castle More images
Alnwick Abbey Gatehouse	Hulne Park, Denwick, Northumberland	Gatehouse	Late 14th century	31 December 1969	NU1786114075; 55°25′13″N 1°43′10″W	1042051	Alnwick Abbey Gatehouse More images
Brizlee Tower	Hulne Park, Denwick, Northumberland	Tower	1781	31 December 1969	NU1580214747; 55°25′35″N 1°45′07″W	1076985	Brizlee Tower More images
Heiferlaw Tower	Denwick, Northumberland	Tower	1470-1489	31 December 1969	NU1826917715; 55°27′11″N 1°42′46″W	1304282	Heiferlaw Tower More images
Hulne Friary Curtain Wall and attached Structure	Hulne Park, Denwick, Northumberland	House	20th century	31 December 1969	NU1637215667; 55°26′05″N 1°44′34″W	1042012	Hulne Friary Curtain Wall and attached Structure
Hulne Friary Summerhouse and Tower	Hulne Park, Denwick, Northumberland	Tower	1488	31 December 1969	NU1633915723; 55°26′06″N 1°44′36″W	1049118	Hulne Friary Summerhouse and Tower
Hulne Priory ruins	Hulne Park, Denwick, Northumberland	Church	16th century	31 December 1969	NU1637315700; 55°26′06″N 1°44′34″W	1042054	Hulne Priory ruins More images
Church of St Mary and St Michael	Doddington, Northumberland	Church	13th century	15 May 1986	NT9957132234; 55°35′02″N 2°00′30″W	1155168	Church of St Mary and St Michael More images
Church of St John the Baptist	Edlingham, Northumberland	Church	11th or 12th century	31 December 1969	NU1144409116; 55°22′33″N 1°49′15″W	1041990	Church of St John the Baptist More images
Edlingham Castle ruins	Edlingham, Northumberland	Castle	1295-1300	13 December 1969	NU1161709198; 55°22′36″N 1°49′06″W	1042032	Edlingham Castle ruins More images
Church of St Cuthbert	Elsdon, Northumberland	Church	12th century	21 October 1953	NY9364793281; 55°14′01″N 2°06′05″W	1155072	Church of St Cuthbert More images
Elsdon Tower	Elsdon, Northumberland	Tower	Before 1415	21 October 1953	NY9361293412; 55°14′06″N 2°06′07″W	1371439	Elsdon Tower More images
Church of the Holy Trinity	Embleton, Northumberland	Church	Late 11th century	31 December 1969	NU2307122487; 55°29′44″N 1°38′11″W	1041822	Church of the Holy Trinity More images
The Old Vicarage	Embleton, Northumberland	Tower	Early 14th century	10 January 1953	NU2305322444; 55°29′43″N 1°38′12″W	1041824	The Old Vicarage More images
Coupland Castle	Coupland, Ewart, Northumberland	House	18th century	21 September 1951	NT9353431156; 55°34′26″N 2°06′15″W	1042343	Coupland Castle More images
Bellister Castle	Featherstone, Northumberland	House	Medieval	10 June 1952	NY7006862959; 54°57′37″N 2°28′08″W	1045292	Bellister Castle More images
Featherstone Castle	Featherstone, Northumberland	House	Early 14th century	10 June 1952	NY6737860955; 54°56′32″N 2°30′39″W	1370307	Featherstone Castle More images
Church of St Michael and All Angels	Felton, Northumberland	Church	c. 1200	15 September 1988	NU1821300199; 55°17′44″N 1°42′53″W	1041881	Church of St Michael and All Angels More images
Etal Castle Gate Tower, South Curtain Wall and South West Tower	Etal, Ford, Northumberland	Castle	1342	21 September 1951	NT9255639314; 55°38′50″N 2°07′11″W	1153966	Etal Castle Gate Tower, South Curtain Wall and South West Tower More images
Etal Castle Great Tower	Etal, Ford, Northumberland	Castle	1342	10 March 1988	NT9249939317; 55°38′50″N 2°07′15″W	1042183	Etal Castle Great Tower More images
Ford Castle	Ford, Northumberland	Castle	14th century	21 September 1951	NT9441637541; 55°37′53″N 2°05′25″W	1371004	Ford Castle More images
Ford Castle Flagpole Tower and forecourt wall to north	Ford Castle, Ford, Northumberland	Castle	14th century	10 March 1988	NT9441437493; 55°37′51″N 2°05′25″W	1154034	Ford Castle Flagpole Tower and forecourt wall to north
Ford Castle Portcullis Gate, Armoury Tower and forecourt wall	Ford Castle, Ford, Northumberland	Castle	1791	10 March 1988	NT9445437462; 55°37′50″N 2°05′23″W	1042185	Ford Castle Portcullis Gate, Armoury Tower and forecourt wall
Hadrian's Wall, Milecastles and Turrets	Greenhead, Northumberland	Wall	122 AD	24 November 1967	NY6826366742; 54°59′39″N 2°29′51″W	1155916	Hadrian's Wall, Milecastles and Turrets More images
Dally Castle	Greystead, Northumberland	Castle	13th century	7 January 1988	NY7748284384; 55°09′12″N 2°21′18″W	1044856	Dally Castle More images
Snabdaugh Farmhouse and attached Cottage	Snabdaugh, Greystead, Northumberland	House	18th century	7 January 1988	NY7868684679; 55°09′22″N 2°20′10″W	1370511	Snabdaugh Farmhouse and attached Cottage More images
Church of the Holy Cross	Haltwhistle, Northumberland	Church	Early 13th century	24 November 1967	NY7075564030; 54°58′12″N 2°27′30″W	1045233	Church of the Holy Cross More images
Hadrian's Wall Milecastle and Turrets	Haltwhistle, Northumberland	Wall	122 AD	24 November 1967	NY7193666812; 54°59′42″N 2°26′25″W	1156053	Hadrian's Wall Milecastle and Turrets More images
Harbottle Castle	Harbottle Village, Harbottle, Northumberland	Castle	13th century	21 October 1953	NT9323004796; 55°20′14″N 2°06′30″W	1041281	Harbottle Castle More images
Lady's Well	Holystone, Northumberland	Well	15th century	21 October 1953	NT9528202913; 55°19′13″N 2°04′33″W	1041283	Lady's Well More images
Church of St Andrew	Hartburn, Northumberland	Church	18th century	20 October 1969	NZ0902886013; 55°10′06″N 1°51′35″W	1371047	Church of St Andrew More images
Haydon Old Church	Old Haydon, Haydon, Northumberland	Church	12th century	15 April 1969	NY8422965294; 54°58′55″N 2°14′53″W	1042512	Haydon Old Church More images
Langley Castle	Langley, Haydon, Northumberland	Castle	c. 1350	20 October 1952	NY8347662473; 54°57′24″N 2°15′34″W	1154672	Langley Castle More images
Cockle Park Tower	Cockle Park, Hebron, Northumberland	Tower	Early 16th century	30 January 1986	NZ2008991157; 55°12′51″N 1°41′09″W	1042088	Cockle Park Tower More images
Church of St Andrew	Heddon-on-the-Wall, Northumberland	Church	12th century	28 April 1969	NZ1338666892; 54°59′47″N 1°47′32″W	1042770	Church of St Andrew More images
Hadrian's Wall Milecastles and Turrets	Henshaw, Northumberland	Wall	122 AD	24 November 1967	NY7473267586; 55°00′08″N 2°23′48″W	1156389	Hadrian's Wall Milecastles and Turrets More images
St Wilfrid's Gateway, the Priory Gatehouse	Hexham, Northumberland	Gate	1976	2 October 1951	NY9350264200; 54°58′21″N 2°06′11″W	1042616	St Wilfrid's Gateway, the Priory Gatehouse More images
Priory of St Andrew former claustral buildings now incorporated into Hexham Court House and Hexham House Clinic	Hexham, Northumberland	Priory	1976	2 October 1951	NY9349664079; 54°58′17″N 2°06′11″W	1370776	Priory of St Andrew former claustral buildings now incorporated into Hexham Court House and Hexham House Clinic More images
The Manor Office	Hexham, Northumberland	House	Mid-19th century	2 October 1951	NY9369864082; 54°58′17″N 2°06′00″W	1281526	The Manor Office More images
The Moot Hall	Hexham, Northumberland	Public Hall	Late 14th or early 15th century	2 October 1951	NY9364564111; 54°58′18″N 2°06′03″W	1042577	The Moot Hall More images
Priory Church of St Andrew	Hexham, Northumberland	Church	7th century	2 October 1951	NY9353664107; 54°58′18″N 2°06′09″W	1042576	Priory Church of St Andrew More images
The Spital	Hexham, Northumberland	House	1802	2 October 1951	NY9271965019; 54°58′47″N 2°06′55″W	1370811	The Spital More images
Church of St Mary	Lindisfarne, Northumberland	Church	Saxon	22 December 1969	NU1256641776; 55°40′10″N 1°48′06″W	1155369	Church of St Mary More images
Lindisfarne Castle	Beblowe, Holy Island, Northumberland	Castle	16th century	6 May 1952	NU1363841751; 55°40′09″N 1°47′05″W	1042306	Lindisfarne Castle More images
Lindisfarne Priory	Holy Island, Northumberland	Priory	13th century	22 December 1969	NU1261741732; 55°40′08″N 1°48′04″W	1042304	Lindisfarne Priory More images
Union Suspension Bridge (that part in England)	Loanend, Horncliffe, Northumberland	Bridge	1819-20	11 February 1988	NT9341651034; 55°45′09″N 2°06′23″W	1042214	Union Suspension Bridge (that part in England) More images
Haughton Castle	Humshaugh, Northumberland	House	c. 1780	20 October 1952	NY9190272899; 55°03′02″N 2°07′42″W	1043027	Haughton Castle More images
Church of St Wilfred	Kirkharle, Kirkwhelpington, Northumberland	Church	14th century	10 November 1951	NZ0116782640; 55°08′17″N 1°59′00″W	1370499	Church of St Wilfred More images
Lesbury Bridge over River Aln	Lesbury, Northumberland	Bridge	15th century	1 September 1988	NU2329411561; 55°23′51″N 1°38′02″W	1371197	Lesbury Bridge over River Aln More images
Church of St Mary	Longframlington, Northumberland	Church	c. 1190	23 October 1953	NU1309401007; 55°18′11″N 1°47′43″W	1303513	Church of St Mary More images
Church of Saints Peter and Paul	Longhoughton, Northumberland	Church	Mid-11th century	31 December 1969	NU2432615100; 55°25′45″N 1°37′02″W	1303950	Church of Saints Peter and Paul More images
The Observatory	Ratcheugh, Longhoughton, Northumberland	Folly	Late 18th century	31 December 1969	NU2243514577; 55°25′29″N 1°38′50″W	1154280	The Observatory More images
Church of St John the Baptist	Meldon, Northumberland	Church	Early 13th century	30 January 1986	NZ1194583877; 55°08′57″N 1°48′51″W	1370616	Church of St John the Baptist More images
Hadrian's Wall Milecastle and Turret	Melkridge, Northumberland	Wall	122 AD	24 November 1967	NY7309067096; 54°59′52″N 2°25′20″W	1156508	Hadrian's Wall Milecastle and Turret More images
Church of St Mary Magdalene	Mitford, Northumberland	Church	Late 12th century	20 October 1969	NZ1689985611; 55°09′52″N 1°44′11″W	1206521	Church of St Mary Magdalene More images
Mitford Castle, remains of inner ward and keep	Mitford, Mitford, Northumberland	Castle	Late 11th century	20 October 1969	NZ1701785492; 55°09′48″N 1°44′04″W	1370755	Mitford Castle, remains of inner ward and keep More images
Mitford Castle, remains of chapel in outer ward	Mitford, Northumberland	Castle	Mid-12th century	20 October 1969	NZ1699985440; 55°09′47″N 1°44′05″W	1370756	Upload Photo
Mitford Castle, remains of East curtain wall	Mitford, Mitford, Northumberland	Castle	12th century	20 October 1969	NZ1705385428; 55°09′46″N 1°44′02″W	1042646	Upload Photo
Mitford Castle, remains of West curtain wall buildings	Mitford, Mitford, Northumberland	Castle	12th century	20 October 1969	NZ1699285433; 55°09′47″N 1°44′05″W	1042645	Mitford Castle, remains of West curtain wall buildings
Mitford Castle, two headstones to north of chapel ruins	Mitford, Mitford, Northumberland	Cemetery	Early 12th century	20 October 1969	NZ1699985446; 55°09′47″N 1°44′05″W	1042647	Upload Photo
Church of St Mary	High Church, Morpeth, Northumberland	Church	18th century	11 August 1950	NZ1971185088; 55°09′35″N 1°41′32″W	1042763	Church of St Mary More images
Morpeth Castle	Morpeth, Northumberland	Castle	13th century	11 August 1950	NZ2001585519; 55°09′49″N 1°41′15″W	1155642	Morpeth Castle More images
The Chantry	Morpeth, Northumberland	Shop	20th century	11 August 1950	NZ2004385885; 55°10′01″N 1°41′13″W	1042759	The Chantry More images
Netherwitton Hall	Netherwitton, Northumberland	House	16th century or earlier	6 May 1952	NZ1022590464; 55°12′30″N 1°50′27″W	1042911	Netherwitton Hall More images
Church of St Bartholomew	Newbiggin by the Sea, Northumberland	Church	pre-13th century	14 March 1949	NZ3178588025; 55°11′08″N 1°30′09″W	1304141	Church of St Bartholomew More images
Church of St Mary, Woodhorn Church Museum	Woodhorn, Newbiggin by the Sea, Northumberland	Church	1818	14 April 1949	NZ3014288845; 55°11′35″N 1°31′41″W	1304471	Church of St Mary, Woodhorn Church Museum More images
Church of St Cuthbert	Norham, Northumberland	Church	Late 12th century	22 December 1969	NT8969347415; 55°43′12″N 2°09′56″W	1303605	Church of St Cuthbert More images
Norham Castle	Norham, Northumberland	Castle	c. 1157	22 December 1969	NT9064747607; 55°43′18″N 2°09′02″W	1154811	Norham Castle More images
Prior Castells Tower	Farne Islands, North Sunderland, Northumberland	Tower	Earlier	22 December 1969	NU2178435996; 55°37′01″N 1°39′21″W	1234461	Prior Castells Tower More images
Nunnykirk Hall	Nunnykirk, Northumberland	House	1825	29 May 1987	NZ0809692626; 55°13′40″N 1°52′27″W	1041251	Upload Photo
Church of St Mary	Ovingham, Northumberland	Church	11th century	15 April 1969	NZ0849863707; 54°58′04″N 1°52′08″W	1044940	Church of St Mary More images
Church of St Mary	Ponteland, Northumberland	Church	12th to 15th century	28 April 1969	NZ1659072955; 55°03′03″N 1°44′31″W	1370736	Church of St Mary More images
Milbourne Hall and Stable Block	Ponteland, Northumberland	House	1801	27 August 1952	NZ1130874394; 55°03′50″N 1°49′28″W	1042725	Milbourne Hall and Stable Block More images
Prudhoe Castle	Prudhoe, Northumberland	Castle	12th century	12 June 1950	NZ0916663408; 54°57′55″N 1°51′30″W	1370476	Prudhoe Castle More images
Beaufront Castle	Beaufront, Sandhoe, Northumberland	House	Late 17th century	15 April 1969	NY9639365942; 54°59′17″N 2°03′28″W	1043009	Beaufront Castle More images
Church of Our Lady	Seaton Valley, Northumberland	Church	18th or early 19th century	28 July 1950	NZ3218876416; 55°04′52″N 1°29′50″W	1041317	Church of Our Lady More images
Seaton Delaval Hall	Seaton Valley, Northumberland	House	1718-29	28 July 1950	NZ3224376528; 55°04′56″N 1°29′47″W	1041321	Seaton Delaval Hall More images
Hopper Mausoleum north-east of St Andrew's Church, Shotley	Greymare Hill, Shotley Low Quarter, Northumberland	Mausoleum	1663	15 April 1969	NZ0453955212; 54°53′30″N 1°55′51″W	1302881	Hopper Mausoleum north-east of St Andrew's Church, Shotley More images
Hadrian's Wall, Milecastles and Turrets	Simonburn, Northumberland	Wall	122 AD	24 November 1967	NY8181470532; 55°01′44″N 2°17′10″W	1045249	Hadrian's Wall, Milecastles and Turrets More images
Church of St Mary	Stamfordham, Northumberland	Church	Saxon	28 April 1969	NZ0765372010; 55°02′33″N 1°52′54″W	1370769	Church of St Mary More images
Blagdon Hall	Blagdon, Stannington, Northumberland	House	Earlier	27 August 1952	NZ2156777043; 55°05′14″N 1°39′49″W	1042662	Blagdon Hall More images
Hadrian's Wall Milecastle and Turrets Hadrians Wall, Milecastle and Turrets	Thirlwall, Northumberland	Wall	122 AD	24 November 1967	NY6383466245; 54°59′22″N 2°34′00″W	1178450	Hadrian's Wall Milecastle and Turrets Hadrians Wall, Milecastle and Turrets More images
Thirlwall Castle	Thirlwall, Northumberland	Castle	Mid-14th century	24 November 1967	NY6593966154; 54°59′20″N 2°32′02″W	1302433	Thirlwall Castle More images
Cocklaw Tower	Cocklaw, Wall, Northumberland	Tower		15 April 1969	NY9392671154; 55°02′06″N 2°05′48″W	1156641	Cocklaw Tower More images
Bridge over River Wansbeck	Wallington Demesne, Northumberland	Bridge	1755	20 October 1969	NZ0335383910; 55°08′58″N 1°56′56″W	1303956	Bridge over River Wansbeck More images
Clock Tower Gate	Wallington Hall, Wallington Demesne, Northumberland	Gate	1754	20 October 1969	NZ0284184303; 55°09′11″N 1°57′25″W	1042870	Clock Tower Gate More images
Wallington Hall	Wallington Demesne, Northumberland	House	1688	6 May 1952	NZ0288084191; 55°09′07″N 1°57′23″W	1042869	Wallington Hall More images
Church of St Michael	Low Warden, Warden, Northumberland	Church	Saxon	15 April 1969	NY9136166490; 54°59′35″N 2°08′12″W	1044988	Church of St Michael More images
Cross in Churchyard about 3m South of Tower of Church of St Michael	Low Warden, Warden, Northumberland	Cross	Early 7th century	12 February 1985	NY9134666484; 54°59′34″N 2°08′12″W	1155434	Cross in Churchyard about 3m South of Tower of Church of St Michael More images
Warkworth Castle curtain walls with Gateway, towers and attached buildings	Warkworth, Northumberland	Castle	12th to 16th century	31 December 1969	NU2471905756; 55°20′43″N 1°36′42″W	1041690	Warkworth Castle curtain walls with Gateway, towers and attached buildings More images
Church of St Lawrence	Warkworth, Northumberland	Church	Early Medieval	31 December 1969	NU2468706184; 55°20′57″N 1°36′44″W	1303446	Church of St Lawrence More images
Warkworth Castle Donjon	Warkworth, Northumberland	Kitchen	13th century	1 September 1988	NU2472105816; 55°20′45″N 1°36′42″W	1303256	Warkworth Castle Donjon More images
Warkworth Hermitage	River Coquet, Warkworth, Northumberland	Folly		31 December 1969	NU2414605952; 55°20′49″N 1°37′15″W	1041684	Warkworth Hermitage More images
Church of St Mary Magdalene	Whalton, Northumberland	Church	11th century	28 April 1969	NZ1306681296; 55°07′33″N 1°47′48″W	1247805	Church of St Mary Magdalene More images
Ogle Castle	Ogle, Whalton, Northumberland	Castle		29 April 1987	NZ1405479077; 55°06′21″N 1°46′53″W	1264065	Ogle Castle More images
Church of St Bartholomew	Whittingham, Northumberland	Church	18th century	21 October 1953	NU0662811933; 55°24′05″N 1°53′49″W	1041257	Church of St Bartholomew More images
Halton Castle	Halton, Whittington, Northumberland	House	c. 1700	5 September 1985	NY9971867841; 55°00′18″N 2°00′21″W	1155641	Halton Castle More images
Halton Church	Halton, Northumberland	Church	12th century	15 April 1969	NY9976567829; 55°00′18″N 2°00′19″W	1155675	Halton Church More images
Church of the Holy Trinity	Widdrington, Northumberland	Church	Late 12th century	20 October 1969	NZ2547995751; 55°15′19″N 1°36′03″W	1371045	Church of the Holy Trinity More images

== See also ==
- Category:Grade I listed buildings in Northumberland
- Grade II* listed buildings in Northumberland
