= List of museums in Northumberland =

This list of museums in Northumberland, England contains museums which are defined for this context as institutions (including nonprofit organizations, government entities, and private businesses) that collect and care for objects of cultural, artistic, scientific, or historical interest and make their collections or related exhibits available for public viewing. Also included are non-profit art galleries and university art galleries. Museums that exist only in cyberspace (i.e., virtual museums) are not included.

== Museums ==
Name	Image	Town/City	Type	Summary
Alnwick Castle		Alnwick	Multiple	Tours of the castle with state rooms, military museum about the Napoleonic Wars, Fusiliers Museum of Northumberland, collection of British and Irish archaeology, collection of vehicles from the 19th century
Armstrong's Household and Farming Museum		North Charlton	History	antique household and farming items in room displays, including a nursery with toys, World War II memorabilia, milking parlour, washing room, agriculture tools and display, local needlework
Aydon Castle		Aydon	Historic house	Operated by English Heritage, 13th-century manor house castle
Bailiffgate Museum		Alnwick	Local	Local history, culture, fishing, agriculture, railways, mining, art exhibits
Bamburgh Castle		Bamburgh	Historic house	Inhabited castle dating back to the Normans, includes museum with engines, technology and history of industrialist William Armstrong, 1st Baron Armstrong
Bellingham Heritage Centre		Bellingham	Local	local history, Border Counties Railway, the Border Reivers, mining, farming, recreated smithy, photographs of rural life
Belsay Castle		Belsay	Historic house	Operated by English Heritage, 14th century medieval castle
Belsay Hall		Belsay	Historic house	Operated by English Heritage, 19th century unfurnished country mansion, gardens and park
Berwick Gymnasium Gallery		Berwick-upon-Tweed	Art	contemporary art installations by Berwick Visual Arts, located in Berwick Barracks
Berwick Museum & Art Gallery		Berwick-upon-Tweed	Multiple	fine art, Asian porcelain and historic glass, medieval Berwick and the castle, local and social history, trades, mining, fishing, located in Berwick Barracks
Blyth Battery		Blyth	Military	World War I and II coastal defence buildings, military and local history exhibits
Cherryburn		Mickley	Historic house	Operated by the National Trust, birthplace of artist and ornithologist Thomas Bewick, exhibits on his life and engravings
Chillingham Castle		Chillingham	Historic house	Medieval castle with state rooms
Chesters Roman Fort		Walwick	Archaeology	Operated by English Heritage, preserved Roman fort on Hadrian's Wall and museum of artifacts
Corbridge Roman Site		Corbridge	Archaeology	Operated by English Heritage, preserved Roman fort south of Hadrian's Wall and museum of artifacts
Cragside		Rothbury	Historic house	Operated by the National Trust, 19th-century country home of Lord Armstrong, features many technological innovations
Fusiliers Museum of Northumberland		Alnwick	Military	Located in Alnwick Castle
George Stephenson's Birthplace		Wylam	Historic house	Operated by the National Trust, 18th century stone cottage home of rail pioneer George Stephenson, railway exhibits
Grace Darling Museum		Bamburgh	Biographical	operated by the RNLI, history and memorabilia of Grace Darling, a Victorian heroine who, along with her father, saved 13 people from the SS Forfarshire in 1838
Heatherslaw Mill		Etal	Mill	19th century water-driven corn mill
Hexham Old Gaol		Hexham	Prison	Medieval prison, crimes and punishment, Border Reivers
Housesteads Roman Fort		Housesteads	Archaeology	Operated by English Heritage, excavated Roman auxiliary fort on Hadrian's Wall and museum of artifacts
Kielder Castle Visitor Centre		Kielder	Multiple	Management of Kielder Forest, its natural history and wildlife including red squirrels, history of Kielder castle, art gallery
Kielder Salmon Centre		Kielder	Natural history	salmon fish hatchery and visitor centre
King’s Own Scottish Borderers Regimental Museum		Berwick-upon-Tweed	Military	Regimental history and memorabilia, located in Berwick Barracks
Lady Waterford Hall		Ford	Art	collection of 19th century watercolour murals depicting biblical scenes painted by Louisa Beresford, Marchioness of Waterford, exhibits about her life
Lindisfarne Castle		Holy Island	Historic house	Operated by the National Trust, 16th-century castle with early 20th-century interiors by Edwin Lutyens, walled garden planned by Gertrude Jekyll
Lindisfarne Centre		Holy Island	Local	island's history and culture, facsimile of the Lindisfarne Gospels, Viking contact
Lindisfarne Priory		Holy Island	Religious	Operated by English Heritage, ruins of the 7th century monastery and museum about its history as a center of early Christianity in Anglo-Saxon England
Longstone Lighthouse		Farne Islands	Maritime	Lighthouse museum, accessible by boat
Museum of Classic Sci-Fi		Allendale	Media	Collection includes artefacts from Doctor Who, Blake's 7, Star Trek, Flash Gordon, Thunderbirds and the Marvel universe.
Morpeth Chantry Bagpipe Museum		Morpeth	Music	Historic bagpipes
Preston Tower		Chathill	Military	Medieval pele tower with period guard room and prison
Seaton Delaval Hall		Seaton Sluice	Historic house	Operated by the National Trust, 18th-century great house with gardens
Vindolanda		Hexham	Archaeology	Roman auxiliary fort south of Hadrian's Wall and museum of artifacts and the Roman army
Wallington Hall		Cambo	Historic house	Operated by the National Trust, Palladian house with fine furnished interior, collection of dollhouses
Warkworth Castle		Warkworth	Historic house	Operated by English Heritage, remains of a medieval castle with some preserved rooms, summer visitation to Warkworth Hermitage
Watch House Museum		Seaton Sluice	Local	
Wylam Railway Museum		Wylam	Railway	information, history of are railway development and local railway pioneers George Stephenson, Timothy Hackworth and William Hedley
Woodhorn Museum		Ashington	Mining	Former colliery with original equipment, buildings, exhibits about the mine and the life of a miner, collection of art created by miners, changing exhibits of art, science and history, 2 ft narrow gauge railway

== Defunct museums ==
- Dilston Castle, Corbridge, no longer open to the public
- Norham Station Museum, Norham, closed in 2010, listed for sale in 2013

== See also ==
- Category:Tourist attractions in Northumberland
