= Elizabeth Marshall (cook) =

British chef (born 1738)

Elizabeth Marshall (1738 - after 1777) was an English cook who ran a patisserie and cookery school in Newcastle upon Tyne between 1770 and about 1790. She is the author of The Young Ladies' Guide in the Art of Cookery, subtitled being a Collection of useful Receipts, Published for the Convenience of the Ladies committed to her Care, by Eliz. Marshall.

Marshall was born in Swarland or Felton, Northumberland in 1738 and was christened in St Michael and All Angels Church on 15 February that year. Her cookery school occupied premises in Mosley Street, Newcastle upon Tyne, and census records show her moving to a neighbouring shop where she paid £10 3s 6d in rateable value.

The Art of Cookery is notable for its inclusion of recipes requiring expensive imported ingredients such as truffles, morels, pineapples and lemons. Marshall used these items in large quantities, for example, her recipe for The Power of Lemons, a concentrated lemon essence, begins with the words "Take a hundred lemons". The book throws light on 18th century cooking practices. For example, Marshall advocated removing salt from butter by washing it in rose water, making it more palatable for the cheesecakes, puddings and sweet pastries she taught her pupils to prepare.

== Selected publications ==
- The young ladies' guide in the art of cookery, being a collection of useful receipts. (Book, 1777). [WorldCat.org]. OCLC 520410122.
