= Thirston House =

Mansion House in Northumberland, England and its owners and occupiers

Coordinates: 55°17′45″N 1°42′27″W

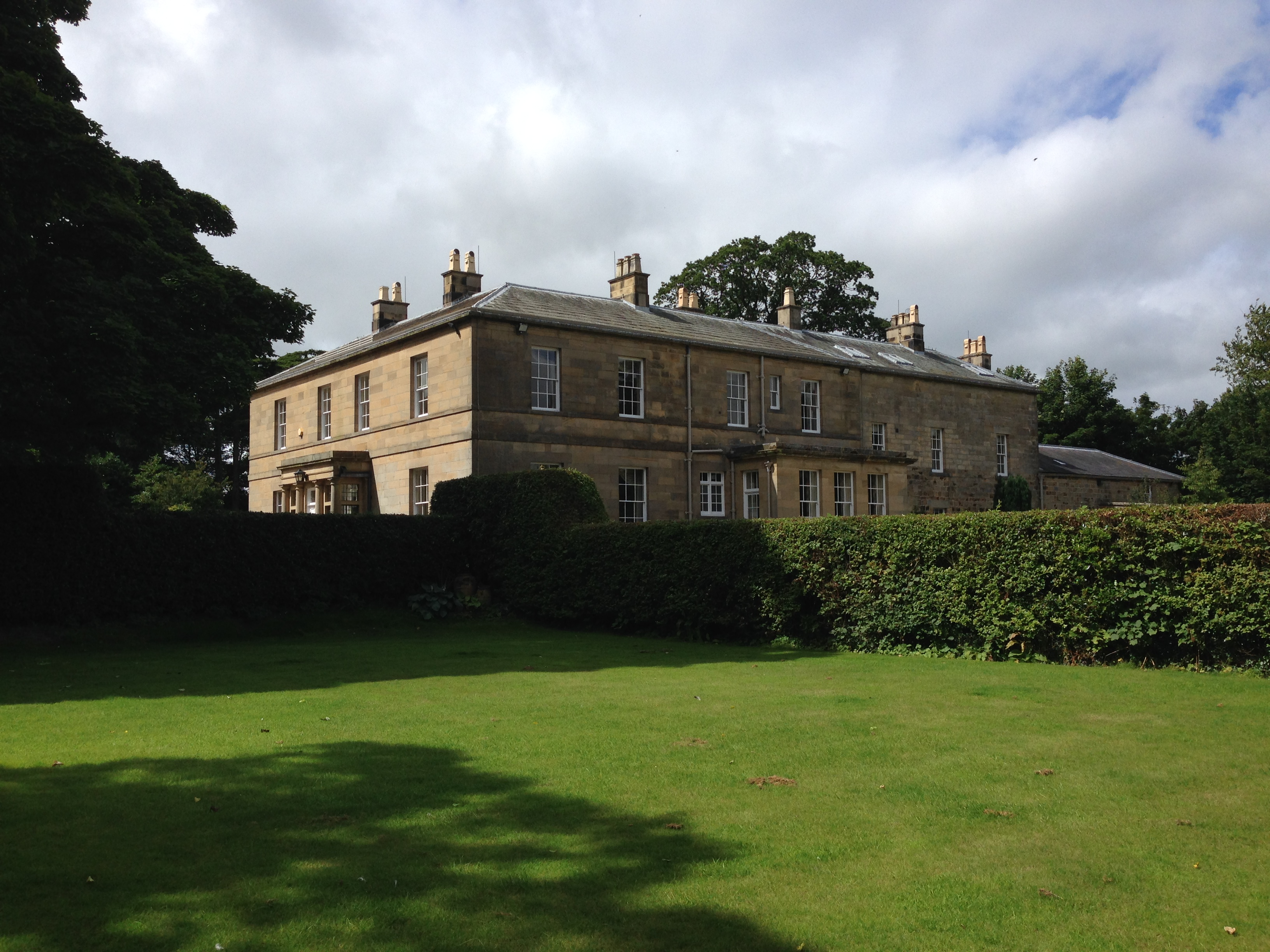
Thirston House

Thirston House sits in its own grounds, on a hill above the River Coquet, in the village of West Thirston in the old parish of Felton in Northumberland, United Kingdom. In 1904 it was recorded that Thirston House 'has recently been sold by Mr. T. W. Smith to Mr. Edward Newton of Newcastle'.

The house, with its attached buildings and courtyard wall, is listed on the National Heritage List for England as a Grade II Listed Building. The listing dates from 1969. The website for Historic England records that the house was built around 1820 by John Dobson for the Newton family. It describes the front of the house as built of ashlar with two storeys, four bays, and with 12-pane sash windows. The front also has a central Tuscan porch, with panelled double doors, in front of which is a raised platform reached by three steps. The porch was glazed in 1902 when the interior of the house was altered and remodelled. The entrance hall and open stair well were panelled and decorative plaster ceilings added.

The website also describes the rear wing and the outbuildings. The rear wing is built of squared stone, with a grey slate roof, and set back from the front of the house. It has four irregular bays. The first three bays had a first floor added in 1902. This with the outbuildings form an L shape and with the stable wing enclose three sides of the rear courtyard. A yard wall, with square gate piers, links to the end of the stable wing. At the back of the stable wing is a boarded loading door with a re-used stone lintel inscribed TD 1728.

The house is also mentioned in several publications including the revised Pevsner's The Buildings of England: Northumberland in 1992, Henry Dobson's book on John Dobson in 2000, and Faulkner and Greg's book on John Dobson in 2001. Pevsner describes the house in three lines and states that it 'is said to be an early work of Dobson' and that it was remodelled in 1902. In Henry Dobson's book are three black and white photographs of the house, from different viewpoints, and a close-up photo of the Tuscan porch. Dobson also states that 'the sections of the east side of the house, to the right and left of the three bay (central) porch, are clearly of different periods'. He also repeats the information that the house was built about 1820 for the Newton family. There is no mention of the house in Faulkner and Greg's chapter on 'Country Houses, Greek and Gothic, 1820-1862'. It is merely listed in a 'Catalogue of Works by John Dobson', at the end of their book, and is described as 'classical house for Newton family, incorporating some earlier work, c.1820'.

John Dobson was a 19th century architect with a distinctive style, well known in the north of England. He is probably best known for designing Central Station in Newcastle upon Tyne, and his work with Richard Grainger in redesigning Newcastle city centre in the Neo-classical style. He built, enlarged and altered hundreds of churches, public buildings and mansion houses during his career, and as Faulkner and Greg state, he built Thirston House in a classical style onto an earlier building.

As it was recorded in 1904 that Thirston House had recently been sold by Mr. T. W. Smith to Mr. Edward Newton, it could not have been the Newton family who commissioned its building or enlargement in 1820.

== The Smith family ==
Thomas William Smith was a direct descendant of the Smiths of Amble and Togston, two villages in the nearby parish of Warkworth, who had held lands in the area probably before the reign of Queen Elizabeth'. In 1706 his 4 x great grandfather bought the estate of George Ledgard in West Thirston. The estate subsequently came into the possession of his 3 x great grandfather. He made West Thirston his home and established the 'West Thirston' branch of the family. In 1768 his great-grandfather, Thomas Smith, inherited the estate. He died in 1826, at the age of eighty-one, and was therefore alive when John Dobson built or enlarged Thirston House.

Thomas William's grandfather, another Thomas Smith, inherited Thirston House and its estate. He died in 1848 at the age of fifty-nine, and his eldest son, Thomas William (the uncle of the above Thomas William) inherited. This Thomas William was a bachelor and he continued to live in Thirston House with his widowed mother and his younger brother, Francis Ralph. He also managed the estate and increased the acreage farmed. In 1861 he was the biggest employer in West Thirston. He died, aged forty-eight, in 1863. His brother, Robert Edwin Smith inherited. Robert Edwin was a solicitor in London and uninterested in farming or running a country estate. And neither of his younger brothers were interested either. Percy Smith was a clergyman and vicar of Grinton in Yorkshire, and Charles Septimus Smith was a merchant and alderman in Newcastle.

Robert Edwin Smith died in 1869 leaving three children under the age of ten, and a fourth child was born a month after his death. The Thirston estate was left in trust for his eldest son, the above Thomas William Smith, then aged six. Meanwhile Robert Edwin's mother continued to live at Thirston House. She died in 1873 aged ninety. She was buried in Felton Parish Churchyard with her husband and her three eldest sons. A large obelisk stone, close to the church porch, marks the grave with inscriptions on four sides of the base. The inscriptions are now much eroded. The Thirston House was advertised 'to be let' a month after Margaret's death:

NORTHUMBERLAND – TO BE LET, partly furnished, for 10 years or such terms as may be agreed upon, and entered to at once, Thirston House, in the parish of Felton, containing spacious entrance hall, good reception rooms, 8 bed rooms, with servants' rooms, and the usual domestic offices, stabling, coach-house, good garden, grass close etc. the whole extending to 7 acres. The House is beautifully situated on the south bank of the River Coquet and is about 2 miles from the Acklington Station of the North-Eastern Railway. Two packs of hounds hunt in the neighbourhood, and excellent trout fishing can be had in the Coquet. A grass close containing 10 acres can be had if desired, together with a cottage.

The advertisement appeared in the newspapers until January 1874 when a tenant was eventually found. However the tenant didn't want any of the house contents and these were advertised to be sold at auction at the end of March. Thirston House was eventually sold, in the early 1900s, to Edward Newton. He also bought thirteen acres of adjoining land, which comprised the large garden, a paddock, and woodland which stretched to the River Coquet. However the Smith family retained the remainder of the estate comprising about 320 acres of farm land.

Once at Thirston House Edward Newton began a programme of renovation which included adding wood panelling and an intricate plasterwork work ceiling to the large entrance hall, and glazing the openings in the Tuscan porch.
