= St Andrew's Church, Bywell =

Coordinates: 54.9481°N 1.9260°W

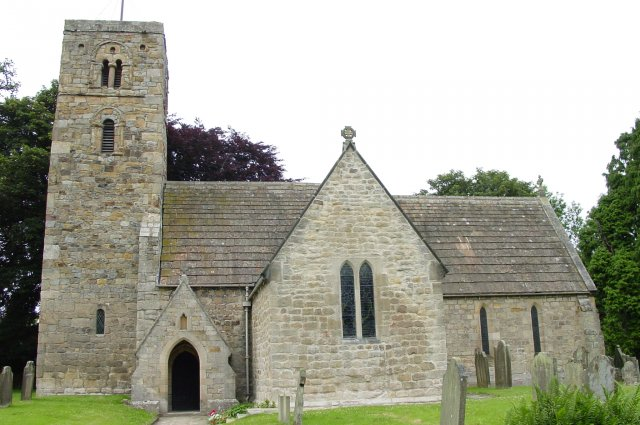
- St Andrew's Church, Bywell, from the south

- Location in Northumberland
- OS grid reference: NZ 048 614
- Location: Bywell, Northumberland
- Country: England
- Denomination: Anglican
- Website: Churches Conservation Trust

History
- Dedication: Saint Andrew

Architecture
- Functional status: Redundant
- Heritage designation: Grade I
- Designated: 15 April 1969
- Architectural type: Church
- Style: Saxon, Gothic
- Completed: 1871

Specifications
- Materials: Stone, stone slate roofs

St Andrew's Church is an Anglican church in the village of Bywell, Northumberland, England. It is recorded in the National Heritage List for England as a designated Grade I listed building, and is under the care of the Churches Conservation Trust.

== History ==
The tower of St Andrew's was designed as a defensive structure; it dates from about 850 and its walls are "massive". The upper part of the tower was added in the early 11th century, and the nave dates from this time or possibly earlier. The chancel and south transept were added in the early 13th century. Alterations were made to the church in 1830, with further alterations in 1850 by John Dobson. In 1871 more additions were made by William Slater; these consisted of a north transept, a chapel, a vestry and probably the south porch. The church was declared redundant on 30 October 1973, and was vested in the Trust on 16 April 1975.

== Architecture ==
=== Exterior ===
The church is constructed in stone, with stone slate roofs. Its plan is cruciform and consists of a nave and chancel with north and south transepts, a north chapel and vestry, a south porch, and a west tower. In the lower stage of the tower is an original round-headed window on the south side, and there is a similar window above a 19th-century lancet window on the west side. The bell openings have two lights. All the windows in the body of the church are lancets; in the transepts these are double, and the east window is a triple lancet. There are cross finials on the gables of the transepts and at the east end.

=== Interior ===
Internally there is a piscina in the chancel and in the south transept. The reredos is a mosaic depicting Saints Peter and Paul. The sanctuary is paved with mosaic, and the communion rails are brass. The carved pulpit has Frosterley Marble shafts with arcading, the lectern is a carved stone eagle, and the font is octagonal on an old base. In the chancel is a Saxon cross set in a Roman block of stone.

== See also ==
- Grade I listed buildings in Northumberland
- List of churches preserved by the Churches Conservation Trust in Northern England
