= Church of St Michael, Alnham =

Church in Northumberland, England

St Michael’s Church, Alnham
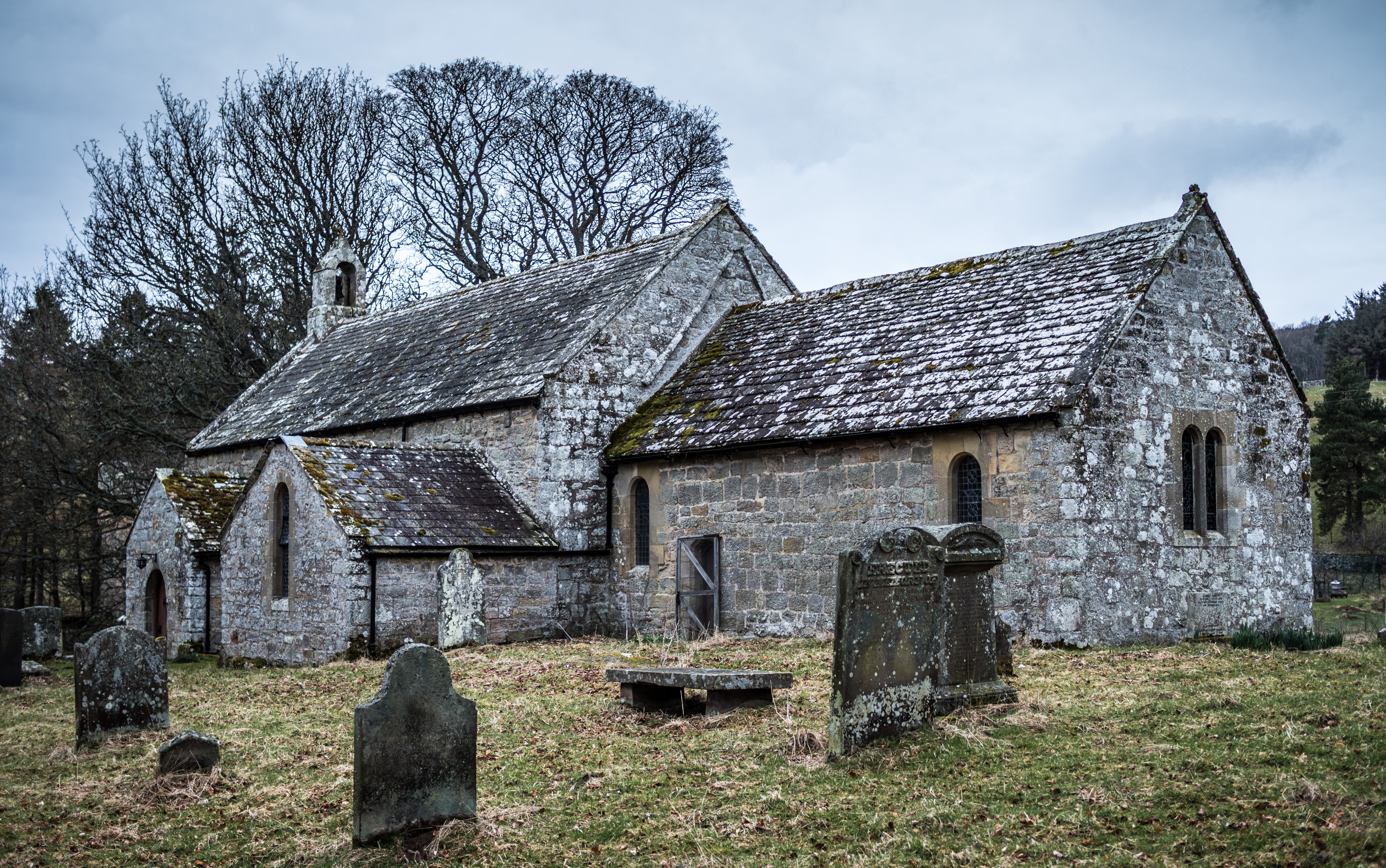
- St Michael’s Church, Alnham
- St Michael’s Church, Alnham
- 55°23′33.99″N 2°00′57.3″W
- OS grid reference: NT 99086 10993
- Location: Castle Hill, Alnham, Northumberland NE66 4TL
- Country: England
- Denomination: Church of England
- Website: https://www.achurchnearyou.com/church/8039/

Architecture
- Heritage designation: Grade I listed

Administration
- Diocese: Diocese of Newcastle
- Archdeaconry: Lindisfarne
- Deanery: Alnwick
- Parish: Upper Coquetdale

The Church of St Michael in Alnham, in the English county of Northumberland, is a medieval structure dating from circa 1200. Built on a Roman camp site, it is mentioned in records dating to 1291; it is a Grade I listed building.

== Parish ==
The Parish of Alnham is situated in the northwest of Northumberland, and the small village lies within 8 miles (13 km) of the Scottish border. The Oliverian Survey of Church Livings, 1650, says:— "That the Parish of Alneham was formerly a Viccaridge, the Earle of Northumberland Patron thereof, Mr. Thompson Viccar, and the value of the said Viccaridge worth twenty pounds p'annu," while the Rentals and Rates of 1663 show that the neighbouring landowners then held the rectorial tithes. Amongst the papers belonging to the parish now in the possession of the Vicar is:—"A Terrier of the Gleeb Land belonging to the Vicaridg of Alneham in the County of Northumberland and Diocese of Durham. Imp".—There is a vicarage house which is an old ruined tower. The parish register begins in 1688.

== Geography ==
The church stands on the site of a small Roman camp, "which most probably has been for a Centurion's guard to protect the herds of cattle when grazing during summer, in the rich pastures on the banks of the river Aln, above Whittingham." The Transitional-style church is situated in a pastoral district near the source of the Aln. Nearby are the remains of a castle, and a pele tower that was later used as the vicarage house. The church is sited on a slope.

== History ==
While the walls are indicative of the period in which it was erected, very few records are available regarding the church's early history and its pre-Reformation rectors. Like most of the ancient parish churches, it would have been built and endowed by the early owners of the manor, but towards the end of the 12th century, William de Vesci granted Alnham Church to the monks of Alnwick Abbey via a charter. It is in this charter (dated 1184) where the first written evidence of the church is found. Its style of architecture corresponds with that period. It would appear that the monastic brethren rebuilt the church, as it was their usual custom either to rebuild or beautify churches that were given to them. In the Taxatio Ecclesiastica—a tax made on all church property about 129—Alnham Rectory was valued at £31. The Nonarum inquisitiones of 1340 states its value was £37 13s. 4d.

In the king's books (Henry VIII, early 16th century), it was valued at £3 7s. as a discharged vicarage. During the reign of Elizabeth, it was also £3 7s. It is part of a formal document written in 1597, by Henry, the ninth Earl of Northumberland, to Thomas Percy. For many years this Thomas Percy, one of the leaders in the Gunpowder Plot, was constable of Alnwick Castle, and auditor and commissioner to the Earl. Notice of Alnham Church is found in Tate's 1866 The History of the borough, Barony and Castle of Alnwick, Vol. I. It is dedicated to St. Michael, the most popular Saint in north Northumberland, with no less than eight churches in the Archdeaconry of Lindisfarne dedicated to him.

== Architecture ==
Although the building appears to date from about 1200, older features include Saxon quoins within the nave. The church is constructed in the style of architecture which prevailed during the early part of the reign of Edward III (mid-1300s), though some of the windows are of more modern construction.

Building features include a bell-cot, a lower chancel, a porch, and a three-bay arcade. There was a north aisle in previous centuries. There are north and south transepts, though only the south one is part of the original construction. The north transept was used as a Sunday school. The chancel has a Transitional arch. There are four buttresses at the west end and two at the north and south. Some of the ancient windows are preserved. The church restorers of the 18th century inserted a few sash windows, and in some minor matters otherwise impaired its integrity. Elements from 16th and 17th-century work include a porch and doorway. A strong roof was added in about 1840.

In 1862, the church was described as having a rickety door and mildewed walls. The western end contained an Early Transitional single window. The rest of the window openings had been modernised and filled with common sashes, which were rotten, letting in wind and rain. The east end had a small square sash, such as is ordinarily provided for a scullery or any inferior office. Three of the pews were square, with a table fixed in the centre of each; a fourth formed three sides of a quadrangle that was occupied by a stove. Fungi abounded, and the pavement was sodden and damp. Ruin was considered imminent unless precautions were taken to avert it. In 1870, the church underwent a careful restoration under the supervision of the architect F. R. Wilson of Alnwick. The bell-cot, which had been lowered to the porch, was to be re-erected on the west gable. Sashes were to be taken out and replaced with windows corresponding with the character of the building. New sittings were to be furnished for the nave, and stalls for the chancel. Restoration and repair work continued into the twentieth and twenty-first centuries.

== Fittings ==
The communion plate consists of four pieces, a cup, a paten, a small, straight-sided flagon, and a brass alms dish. The small bowl font, which dates to 1664, has heraldic devices; the symbols associate it with the Percy family. On the chancel floor, there are tomb slabs. The bell is inscribed "Alnham," Nov. 1759". Within the walls of the church and on the outside grounds, there are several tablets and gravestones. An inscription on a mural tablet is in memory of the Collingwoods who were at one time an important family in the area.
