= Church of the Holy Trinity, Embleton =

Grade I listed church in Northumberland, England

Coordinates: 55.4956°N 1.6365°W

Embleton Church, late 19th century.

The Church of the Holy Trinity is located in Embleton, Northumberland, England. The church, dedicated to the Holy Trinity, is west of the village. Built in the form of a cross, it consists of a two aisle nave, a clerestory, a chancel, a porch, and a chantry chapel. It has a tower with a small vestry, and a gallery. The vicarage house and garden are on a gradual slope on the south side of the churchyard. Traces of stonework show evidence of an earlier church from the 12th century. It is a Grade I listed building.

== History ==
There is no evidence of a church at Embleton preceding the Conquest. There are, however, some remains which indicate that there was a stone church on this site before the end of the 11th or in the early part of the 12th century consisting of a nave without aisles, a tower and a chancel. Of the tower, the lower portion remains. Light was provided by two windows, which are partly obscured.

The dedication to the Holy Trinity may have been preceded by another, as in Bacon's Liber Regis (1534–5) and in Randall's State of the Churches under the Archdeaconry of Northumberland (c. 1778), there is mention of a dedication to St. Mary. In 1830, when known as St. Mary's, the patron was Merton College, Oxford.

== Architecture and fittings ==
Embleton church's superstructure is similar to others such as those of Yorkshire or the Midlands. The open battlement resembles that found at St Michael's Church, Coxwold in North Yorkshire; this pierced battlement is an unusual feature for a country church in northern England.

Nave

Most of the Norman era nave no longer exists, except the walls which later included arcades. The subsequent nave has elements that are considered unusual for work done in the north country. It is 53 feet (16 m) long and 16 feet (4.9 m) wide, with two aisles. The chancel is 37 feet (11 m) in length and 18 feet (5.5 m) in width. The arcades have three bays each; their arches are supported by ornamented shafts. The arches have chamfered orders, and the hood-mouldings are also ornamented. In the north aisle, just above the eastern pillar, there is a square-moulded bracket which dates to the time of the aisle widening, about 1330–40; it was probably added to hold a light or image in connection with the adjoining chantry.

Clerestory

The clerestory, built circa 1330–40, contains three windows; the rear arch ones being old, while those of the tracery being modern. The arches that open into the western extension of the aisles are modern. The responds of the tower arch are pear-shaped, and date to the time of the nave arcades, but the arch itself is later, and may possibly have been built at the time of the upper stages of the tower, about 1330–40. The addition to the north aisle projects 11 feet (3.4 m) to the north, and contains a square aumbry. A groove for the parclose screen exists on each side of the arch. There appears to have been another chantry, or possibly two, at the east end of the north aisle, with which two niches, one on each side of the east window, were connected. There was another chantry at the east end of the south aisle, connected with a square aumbry just south of the corbel. There are two brackets at different levels on the north side of the aisle's east window with carvings of a female head. South of the window, there is a plain bracket. These three brackets probably all belong to the chantry.

Chancel

There is no doubt that Dunstanburgh Castle formed a quarry for stones with which an earlier chancel was built. However, nothing exists of the Norman chancel. Above the present modern chancel arch is a pointed opening, now filled in, which may have been a window. Beneath it, the line of the original Norman nave roof is visible. The chancel, considered modern in the 1800s, features windows containing excellent specimens of stained glass by Charles Eamer Kempe, in memory of the late Sir George Grey of Fallodon.

Windows

The 1953 coronation of Queen Elizabeth II is commemorated by a window in the west side of the church, and a north-facing window is dedicated to a vicar from Merton College. There are two windows in the side walls and one at the east end of each aisle. They are all similar and, though modern, probably are representative of the originals. They match the tower's belfry windows. The three windows at the west end are modern.

Inscriptions, memorials and monuments

There are inscriptions in numerous places including a tablet on the south side of the chancel, in the south aisle, and at the west end of the south aisle. There are memorials to the Right Honourable Sir George Grey and to George Henry Grey, lieutenant colonel of the Northumberland Light Infantry Militia, a tablet to the widow of George Grey of Southwick, and a monument to Shafto Craster of Craster Tower.

Renovation

The church has undergone multiple restorations, including one by John Dobson of Newcastle in 1850, when the Falloden aisle was built; and another by F. R. Wilson in 1867 when the chancel was rebuilt. The first alteration seems to have been the replacing of the original chancel by another one, probably larger, towards the end of the 12th century, about 1180. There is no certain proof that this change took place, but the present modern chancel arch is supported upon two capitals that are of the Transitional style. The next change that took place was the addition of aisles to the nave, and the insertion of a three bay arcade on either side in the old walls about the year 1200. No further alteration appears to have been made until the 14th century, when, about 1330–40, the aisles were rebuilt on a more extended plan. They were widened, and were projected westwards as far as the west wall of the tower, so that the tower, which in the Norman church had been isolated, became attached. The two upper stages of the tower were then rebuilt. At the same time, a chapel was added. No other additions or alterations appear to have been made until the 19th century, with a new chancel. All the windows in the body of the church were renovated, most of them being copies of the previous ones. Into the walls of the more modern vestry, several ancient stones were discovered during renovation of the old chancel which was of the Georgian period.

== Grounds ==
The churchyard has an inscription in memory of Major-General Henry Darling. The vicarage is situated to the southwest of the church. The garden is found to the south and was laid out in 1828 during the time of George Grimes when other additions were made to the house by Dobson of Newcastle. The grey stoned Embleton Tower is picturesque. A very complete find was made in this churchyard of groats of about the time of the Wars of the Roses.
