= Moot Hall, Hexham =

Municipal building in Hexham, England

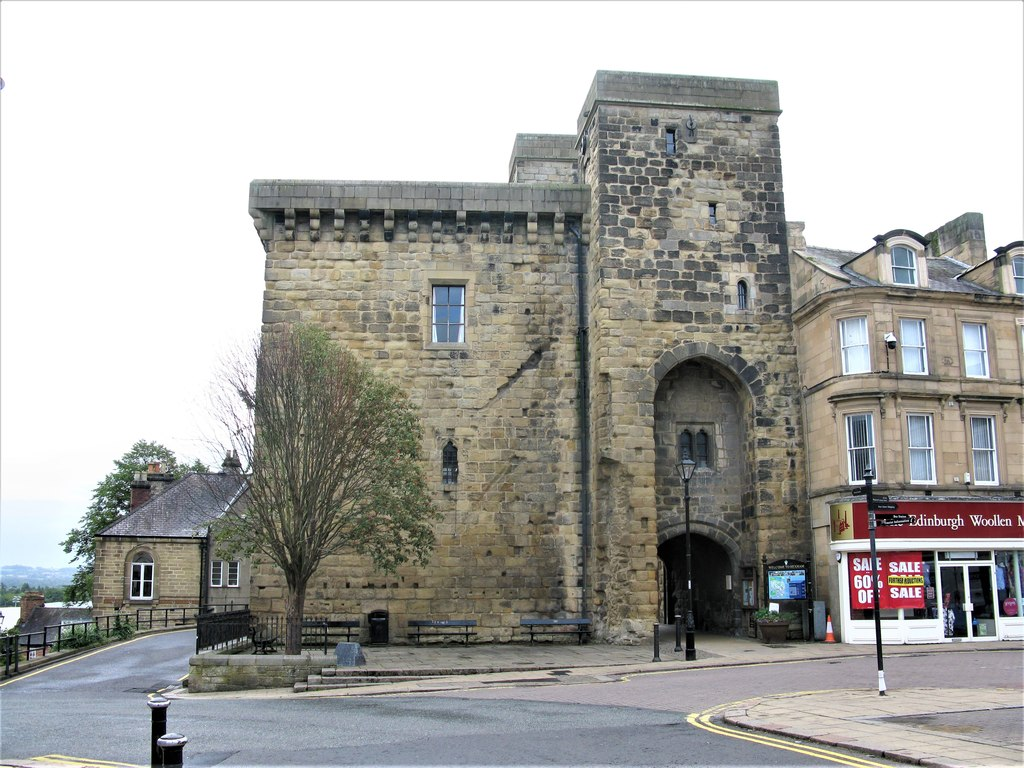
- Moot Hall, Hexham

- Shown in Northumberland
- 54.9716°N 2.1008°W
- Location: Market Place, Hexham

History
- Built: c.1379

Site notes
- Architectural style: Medieval style

Listed Building – Grade I
- Official name: The Moot Hall
- Designated: 2 October 1951
- Reference no.: 1042577

The Moot Hall is a former judicial structure in The Market Place, Hexham, Northumberland, England. The structure, which currently accommodates an art gallery on the ground floor and the museums department of Northumberland County Council on the upper floors, is a Grade I listed building.

== History ==
The building was commissioned by the Archbishop of York, Alexander Neville, as a gatehouse to an enclosure now known as Hallgate, where the Old Gaol stands. The Moot Hall was designed in the Medieval style, built in rubble masonry and was completed in around 1379.

The design involved a four-storey tower, with a three-storey annexe to the left, facing onto the Market Place. The tower featured a two-storey round headed recess containing a vaulted carriageway on the ground floor and a bi-partite mullioned window with cusped heads on the first floor. There were lancet windows on the floors above and a parapet at roof level. The annex was fenestrated by a single window with a cusped head on the first floor and by a casement window on the second floor; it was surmounted by a heavily machicolated parapet. Internally, the principal rooms were a vaulted space on the ground floor, the courtroom on the first floor and the bailiff's hall on the second floor.

The courtroom served as the main courtroom of the former Liberty or Peculiar of Hexhamshire until the county was absorbed into Northumberland in 1572. After that it was used as a venue for the midsummer quarter sessions until 1838, and the building still stands as one of the best surviving examples of a medieval courthouse in the north of England.

A collection of 10,000 books, which had been presented by a local grocery chain proprietor, Joseph William Brough, in 1948, was stored in the building and remained there until it was relocated to a new library in the central section of the Queen's Hall in 1983. The upper storeys of the building subsequently accommodated the museums department of Tynedale District Council, and since the introduction of unitary authorities in 2009, they have accommodated the museums department of Northumberland County Council. Meanwhile, the vaulted space on the ground floor has been made available for hire as an art gallery.

== See also ==
- Grade I listed buildings in Northumberland
