= Embleton Tower =

Peel tower in Northumberland, England

- Northumberland, England, UK
- Embleton Vicarage, c. 1904

Location
- Location in Northumberland
- Coordinates: 55.495°N 1.637°W
- Grid reference: NU23062244

Embleton Tower is a peel tower and Grade I listed building in the village of Embleton in Northumberland, England. Tradition states that in 1395, the tower was built to protect the minister and parishioners of Embleton's Church of the Holy Trinity after the village suffered from a raid by the Scots. The first vicarage was provided for the vicar of Embleton by Merton College, Oxford, who held the patronage of the parish, in 1332. According to Montagu Francis Finch Osborn (1843–1910), vicar of Embleton in 1884, vicarages were erected at three different periods; by 1416, the Vicar's Turris de Emyldon was known to exist. The present building includes a house built in about 1828 as a vicarage adjoining the tower.

== Geography ==
A low ridge lies between the vicarage and the sea, about a mile away at Embleton Bay. Its garden was sheltered with trees. In the field adjoining the tower, there is an ancient dovecote. Dunstanburgh Castle is approximately 1 mile (1.6 km) away. Howick is 5 miles (8.0 km) south of the vicarage.

== History ==
The tower was built in 1395, at a cost of £40. Mentioned as the vicar's property in 1415, it was remodelled in the 16th century. In about 1828, a vicarage designed in the Tudor style by architect John Dobson, was built on one side of the tower. From 1875 to 1884, the vicarage was occupied by the historian and clergyman Mandell Creighton and his family. He began his History of the Papacy at the vicarage; he and his wife Louise between them wrote a total of 15 books while there. Peter Karney, the son of Bishop Arthur Karney, was the vicar from 1954 to 1974; on his retirement the vicarage passed into private hands and became known as Embleton Tower. A new vicarage was built nearby.

Architect and civil engineer Kay Seymour-Walker lived in the house from his retirement until his death in 2018: he left the tower to his gardener, and it was put on sale in 2021. A report at the time indicated that the structure has "eight bedrooms, seven reception rooms, a conservatory and a library" but "requires extensive repairs and modernisation".

== Architecture ==
The tower is three storeys high and has two vaulted rooms in the basement. Similar to the towers of Alnwick and Morpeth, the Embleton tower has stone groining. Built as a rectangle with a high, plain, chamfered base, it measures 19 feet 8 inches (5.99 m) from east to west, and 40 feet 7 inches (12.37 m) from north to south. A chimney projects near the centre of the east wall. A three-light window and a small slit have been blocked up to the south side of it. There is a two-light window of the same type on the second floor. The roof rests on thin gables. It appears that the original roof was on a higher level than the present one. The embrasures are well proportioned. The tower probably had a spire made of wood and lead, similar to another at Ryton.

=== Interior features ===
Internally, the first floor is not unusual. The stair to the vaults is not accessible in the present day. Some steps of the stairs that led to the second floor are, however, to be seen in a cupboard in the north-east corner. The second floor was likely one room with plain stone corbels around the walls.

=== Stages ===
The tower structure consists of three stages, the lower one retaining its original Norman features. The two upper stages are of the 1330–40 era, when large alterations were made in the church. The middle stage has on the west side two small square-headed windows, and on the south a small trefoil-headed one. This stage may have been used as a chamber for temporary or even more permanent residence. The parapet has an open style, with six openings. The upper belfry stage has on each side a window and is divided by a transom.

=== Vaulted chambers ===
In the basement of the tower are two vaulted chambers, the vaults both resting on a partition wall in the centre. The northern chamber is 16.5 feet (5.0 m) long from north to south, and 12.3 feet (3.7 m) wide. In the middle of the north wall is a fireplace 5.5 feet (1.7 m) wide. On the left of it is an aumbry 2 feet (0.61 m) wide and deep, and 1.7 feet (0.52 m) high; on the right is a smaller aumbry. Near the south-west corner of this vault are located two pointed doorways. These vaults, renovated with modern partitions, are approached by a door in the northern vault. The churchyard immediately to the north is much higher than the ground where the tower is located. There is a square-headed original opening at the north end of the east wall. A vaulted chamber on the ground floor was a receiving area for cattle.

=== Vicarage ===
The former vicarage is a large house built onto the peel tower. It is constructed of black basalt.
