= Alnwick Town Hall =

Municipal building in Alnwick, Northumberland, England

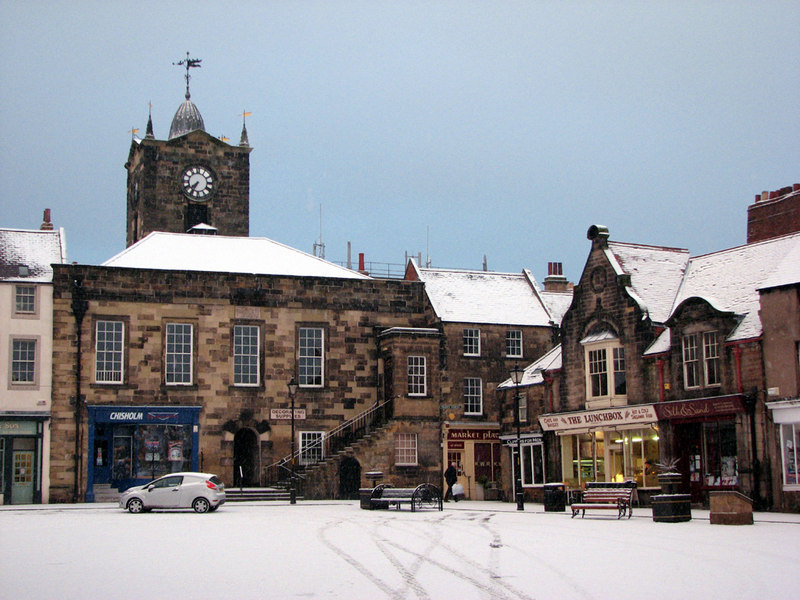
- Alnwick Town Hall

- Shown in Northumberland
- 55.4134°N 1.7077°W
- Location: Market Place, Alnwick

History
- Built: 1731

Site notes
- Architectural style: Neoclassical style

Listed Building – Grade I
- Official name: Town Hall
- Designated: 25 August 1977
- Reference no.: 1157140

Alnwick Town Hall is a municipal building in the Market Place, Alnwick, Northumberland, England. The structure, which was the meeting place of the common council, is a Grade I listed building.

== History ==
The first building on the site was an early 16th century "brewhouse" established by the Earl of Northumberland, as lord of the manor, before passing into private hands and then being acquired by the burgesses in 1585. The burgesses operated it as a brewery for the people of the town but latterly used it as a tolbooth i.e. municipal building. By the late 17th century the building was in a dilapidated state and the burgesses decided to demolish it and to erect a bespoke town hall in its place.

The new building was designed in the neoclassical style, built in ashlar stone at a cost of £730 and was completed in 1731. The design involved an asymmetrical main frontage with five bays facing onto the Market Place (a large shop front would be inserted in the first and second bays in 1770). A steep flight of steps, built across the fourth bay, led from the ground floor up to a first floor porch in the fifth bay. In the central bay, there was a rusticated and arched entrance to a passageway going through to Fenkle Street. There were sash windows in the other bays on the first floor. At roof level, there was a parapet. Internally, the principal room was the public hall, which was used for meetings of the common council, as well as quarter sessions hearings. There were also two adjoining rooms.

Alnwick Town Hall viewed from the west.

A three-stage clock tower was added to the rear by a Mr Bell in 1767 (topped with pediments on each side); small corner spires, designed by George Hastings, were added to the tower in 1771. That same year a new clock was installed, manufactured locally by one David Hastings, 'a man famous in the town for his ingenuity'; the old clock (which dated from 1717) was removed and reinstalled in the nearby Pottergate Tower.

In the early 19th century theatrical events took place in the town hall with Stephen Kemble playing Falstaff there. In 1876 the clock was again replaced (and, as before, the old clock was installed in the Pottergate Tower, where it replaced its predecessor). The new clock, manufactured by W. F. Evans of Handsworth, chimed the quarters on two bells and struck the hours on a third. Illuminated dials were also added to the clock at this time. (The clock remains in service and has to be wound by hand each week).

The borough council, which met in the town hall, was abolished under the Municipal Corporations Act 1883. After the town became an urban district in 1894, the building remained in use by the urban district council until it moved to new offices at the site of the former Alnwick Workhouse in Wagonway Road after the Second World War. The town hall became the venue for the annual Alnwick Beer Festival, when it was established in 2007, and subsequently also become the venue for a local art gallery.

== See also ==
- Grade I listed buildings in Northumberland
