= Heatherslaw Mill =

Coordinates: 55°38′20″N 2°06′27″W

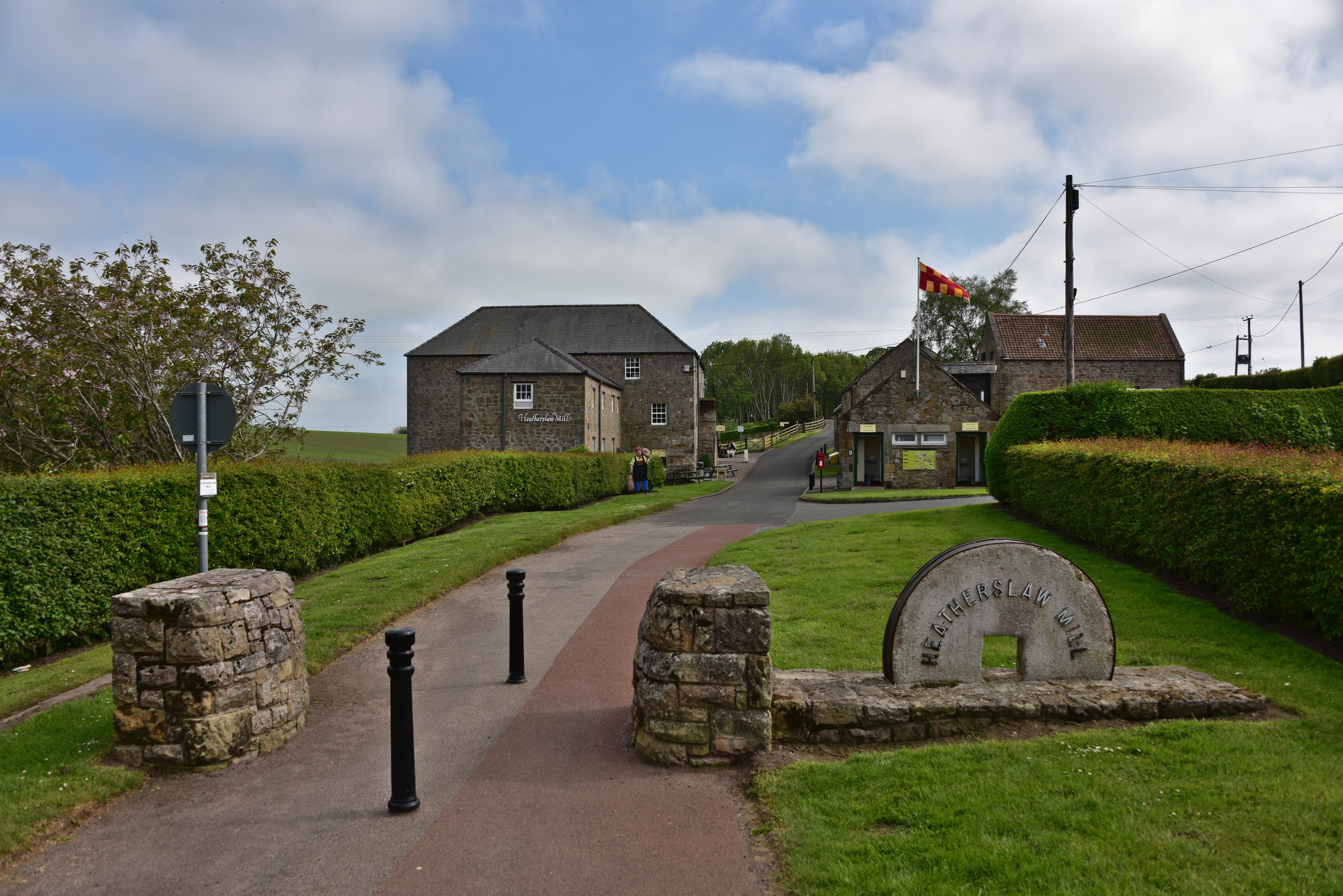
- Heatherslaw Mill viewed from the north

General information
- Type: Water mill
- Location: Etal
- Country: England

Heatherslaw Mill is a water mill situated on the Ford and Etal Estate, 7 miles north of the town of Wooler in the English county of Northumberland.

It is a restored 19th century water driven cornmill. Traditional methods and original machinery powered by the River Till are used to grind locally grown wheat into wholemeal flour. Its huge water wheel, mill stones and gearing are all visible. Freshly milled flour and local "Berwick Biscuits" are on sale in its gift shop whilst the mill cafe serves country fare.
