= Corbridge Vicar's Pele =

Pele tower in Northumberland, England

- Northumberland, England, UK
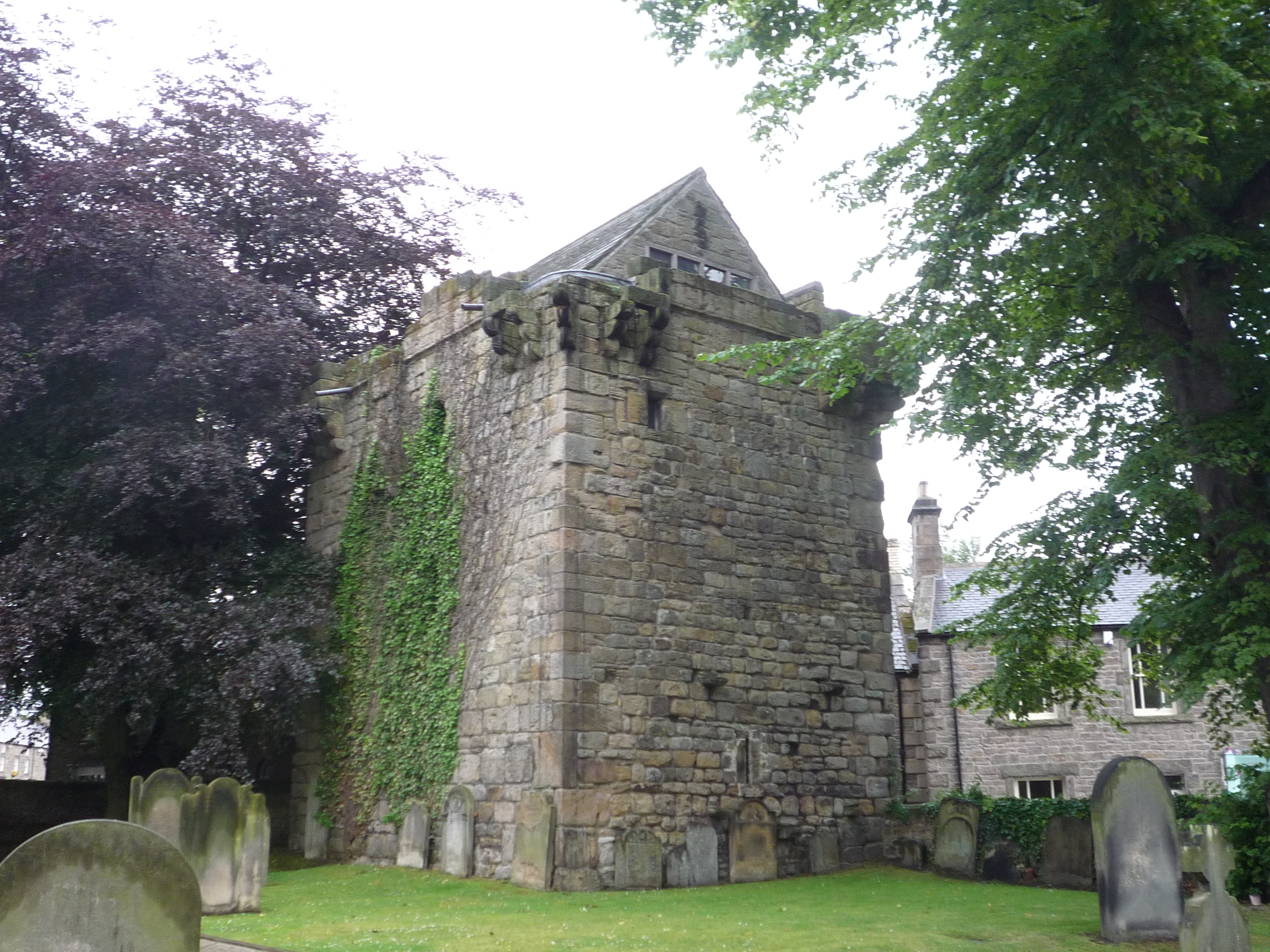

Location
- Location in Northumberland
- Coordinates: 54.974°N 2.019°W
- Grid reference: NY987644

Corbridge Vicar's Pele is a pele tower in the village of Corbridge, Northumberland, England.

It was a three-storey defensive pele tower, with one room to each storey, built in the churchyard in 1318, and used as the vicarage for the adjacent church. It is built largely from sandstone taken from the Roman fortress at Coria nearby. It was in use as a vicarage until the early 17th century. In the summer of 2016 the tower was re-opened as a bar and events venue after a three-year redevelopment project.
