= Bitchfield Tower =

House in Belsay, Northumberland, England

- Northumberland, England, UK
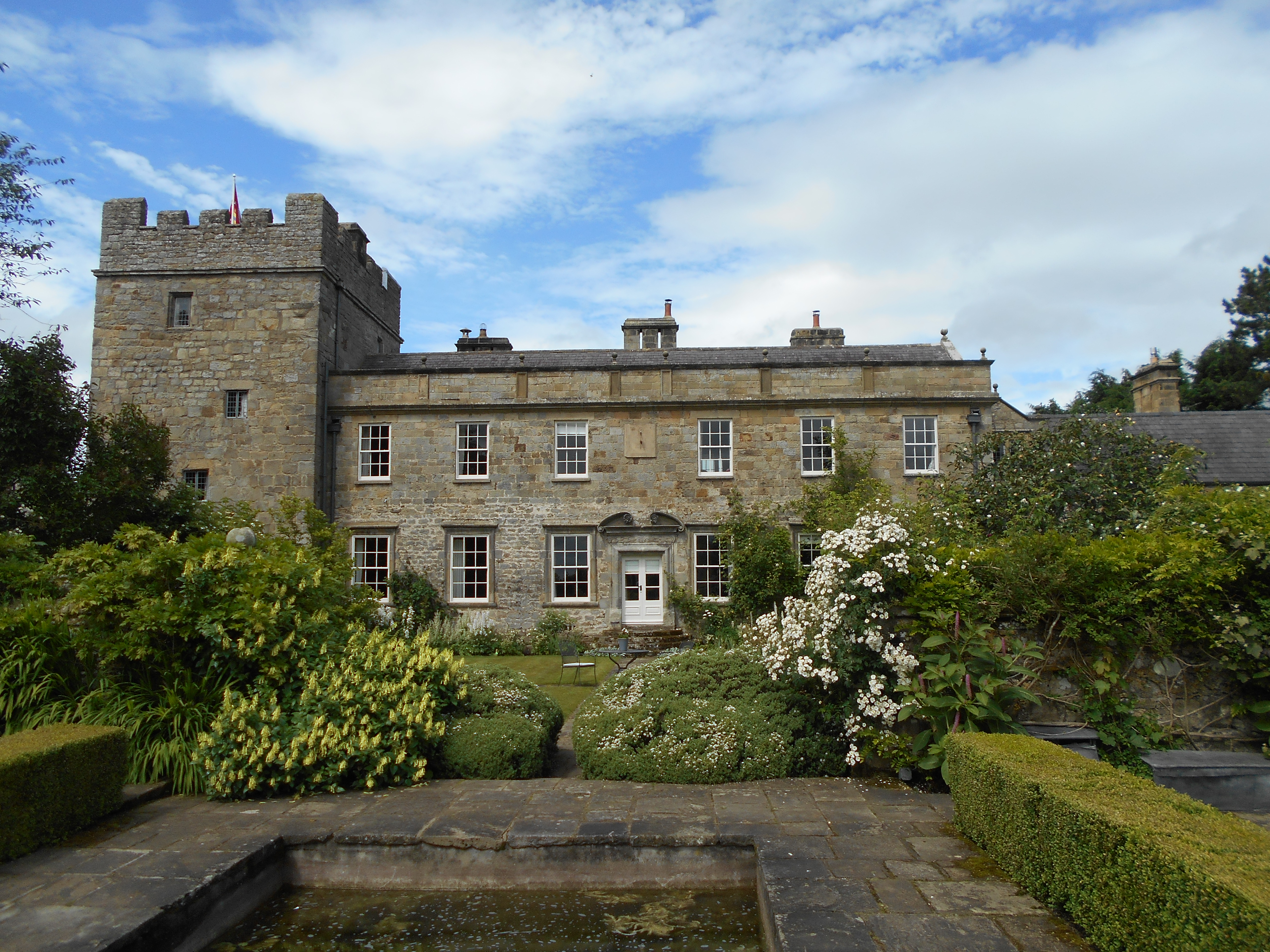

Location
- Location in Northumberland
- Coordinates: 55.089°N 1.857°W
- Grid reference: NZ091771

Bitchfield Tower or West Bitchfield Tower is a medieval pele tower near Belsay, Northumberland, England. It is a Grade I listed building.

The three storied battlemented tower was built in the 15th century by the Middleton family who sold it to the Harbottles in 1502. Marjorie Harbottle the heiress to the Harbottle estate, married Sir John Fenwick of Fenwick Tower and in 1529 they conveyed the property to their second son Roger Fenwick. In 1622 Robert Fenwick built a new manor house adjoining the tower: a datestone inscribed 'RF 1622 JF' is incorporated into the building

The Fenwicks sold the estate in 1630 to Edward Grey, from whom it was sequestered in 1646. In 1680 it was acquired by Sir James Clavering and in 1802 the Claverings sold to Sir Charles Monck.

It was in a state of ruin by 1930 but has since been restored. The east wing was added by the architect Caroë and Lord Gort in 1935. The tower was listed on 27 August, 1952.
