= Church of St Michael and All Angels, Felton =

Church in Northumberland, England

Coordinates: 55.2955°N 1.7147°W

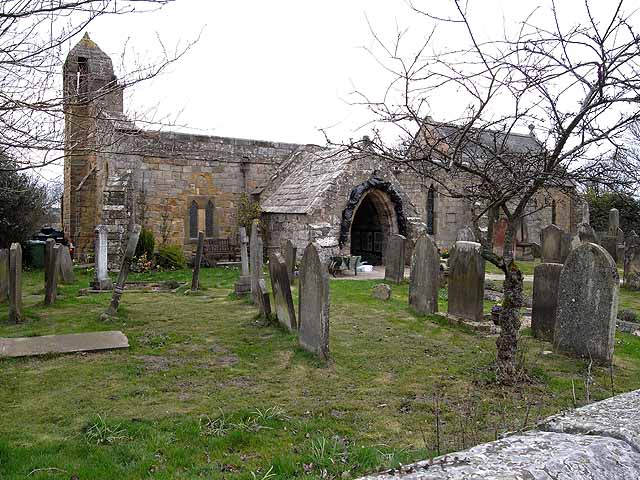
Church exterior.

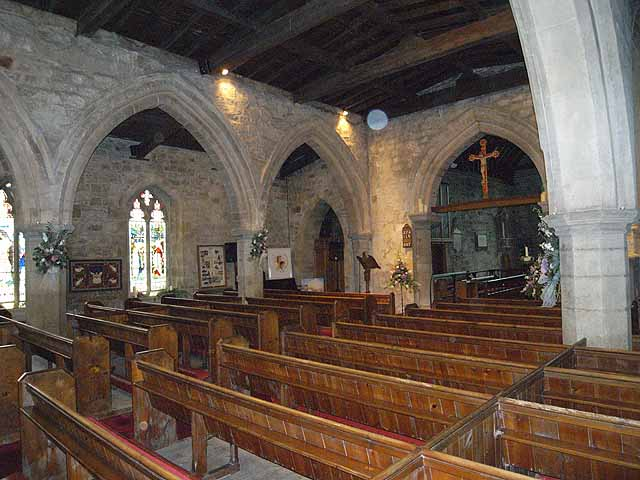
Church interior.

The Church of St Michael and All Angels is a parish church located on Riverside in Felton, Northumberland, England. Built circa 1200, its many alterations and additions have caused it to be almost encased within another church. Some unusual features are that the nave and an aisle appear roofless, as well as a window with geometrical tracery that features an eight-petalled flower patterned central circle cut from a single stone. Dedicated to Saint Michael, it is a Grade I listed building.

== Geography ==
The small village is situated about 10 miles (16 km) south of Alnwick, and 9 miles (14 km) north of Morpeth. The nearest city, Newcastle upon Tyne, is 24 miles (39 km) and the Scottish border is about an hour's drive from Felton. The church is located on a high wooded ridge to the west of the village on the Great North Road. It is situated on top of a steep slope between the River Coquet and Back Burn, with meadows from the graveyard stretching to the Burn. Felton Park, a hunting forest and a designed landscape, is west of the church.

== History ==
St. Michael, or St. Michael and All Angels, is a dedication of very frequent occurrence in the northern parts of Northumberland. Felton's 13th-century church has seen many alterations and additions, and has become by virtue of them almost encased within another church, quite literally as far as the porches are concerned. A writ was issued on 22 March 1331/2, on the petition of Roger Mauduit of Eshott, to ascertain whether it would be to the loss or damage of the king (Edward II) if he were to grant Roger a licence to endow a chantry in the church of St Michael of Felton, with lands in Eshott of the value of 100s. a year, to provide a chaplain to perform divine service every day for his soul, and for those of his heirs and ancestors. The licence was granted later in 1332. In 1759, Thomas Heron of East Thirston provided a sum of money to build a gallery, probably followed by the erection of the north aisle with sash windows.

== Architecture ==
The earliest work is in the chancel and nave, the latter having originally been without aisles. Together, they formed a low narrow building, measuring from east to west about 104 feet (32 m), and about 20 feet (6.1 m) in width. The semi-round respond at the east end of the north nave arcade is similar to the jambs of the chancel arch, and possibly indicates the presence of a small transept or chapel. There was a bell turret at the west end of the nave, and a porch on the south side. The 14th-century builders nearly doubled the size of the fabric. They took down the north and south walls of the nave, and erected two arcades in their place, that on the north consisting of five arches, but that on the south of three, because the old porch was not demolished, but allowed to stand, which entailed a different proportion of the space. They rebuilt the bell turret on the older buttresses, and a new porch. The chancel arch is of two chamfered orders, with a chamfered hood-moulding towards the nave, and is carried on semi-round responds having moulded bases on square and chamfered plinths, and capitals, with square hollow chamfered abaci. It is strengthened with a buttress at the south-east angle. Between the 14th century and the renovation of circa 1845 there were other changes. Around 1845, the easternmost half of the north aisle was taken down and widened to three times its former dimensions. A small vestry was added in the late 1860s when a gallery at the west end was removed; the church was newly seated, and new windows were inserted. Some of the roof areas are quite low so that they appear invisible from outside; examples include over the nave and an aisle.

Doors

The details of the south doorway are similar to those of the chancel arch, but they have been much interfered with, only the outer order of the arch and the capitals being ancient. On the south side of the chancel, the low arched priests' door was built up, and a square cottage door of higher height inserted westwards of it. Probably a priest's door once existed where the modern chancel door now is, as there is no evidence of a window at this point.

Windows

The three windows on the south side of the chancel are lancets with widely splayed jambs on the interior, contracted by shoulders at the springing of the arch, which give to the latter a trefoil form. In the eastern wall of the south aisle, there is a beautiful example of the work of the period. A five-light window features geometrical tracery with an eight-petalled flower patterned central circle, remarkably cut from a single stone. This window was probably inserted in 1331/32, at the instance of Roger Mauduit when he was granted a licence to endow a chantry in the church. The small Early English Period east light, or triplet, was removed during a renovation to make room for a gaping round-headed sash window of small square panes.

Porch

A porch to the south door seems to have been the first addition to the church, the outline of which can be easily traced, and it reached to the present aisle wall. The 14th-century builders who added aisles to the structure did not take down the 13th-century porch they found on the south side, but enclosed it in their addition. From it they built out a second porch, which now gives access to the first. The roof line of the original porch may be seen over the early door on the inside of the present south door, and is supported by a chamfered arch rib. The outer door to the first porch, now the inner one of the existing porch, is of two chamfered orders that continue to the ground, with a hood-moulding springing from carved terminals. Several courses remain of the diagonal buttresses which originally flanked this door.

== Fittings ==
The church has two old bells. One is pre-Reformation, having the inscription "Ave . M | Ria . Gracia. Plena" and the other was probably made in 1764. The side benches are of stone. The bowl and shaft of the font are octagonal; it has been re-chiselled and appears to be of the 14th century. In the north wall is a portion of the effigy of a priest holding a chalice; it rests within an arched recess springing from moulded capitals and may also date from the 14th century.

== Vicarage ==
A few yards from the entrance gates is the former vicarage, a long, low, building erected in 1758. The vicarage's formal garden lies alongside the road to the church. The vicarage house is situated on the east of the churchyard, with an extensive prospect to the north. It was either built or re-built by Robert Henderson, vicar of Felton from 1683 to 1726. Above the south door, there is an inscription dated 1683.
