= Berwick town walls =

Defensive structure of Berwick, England

- Berwick-upon-Tweed, Northumberland
- The town walls near Shore Gate

Site information
- Type: Town wall

Location
- Shown within Northumberland
- Location within Northumberland
- Coordinates: 55.7649°N 2.0048°W
- Grid reference: grid reference NT998524

Berwick's town walls are a sequence of defensive structures built around the town of Berwick-upon-Tweed in England.

== History ==
=== Medieval fortification ===
Berwick's town walls were built in the early 14th century under Edward I, following his capture of the city from the Scots. When complete they stretched 2 miles (3.2 km) in length and were 3 feet 4 inches thick and up to 22 feet (6.7 m) high, protected by a number of smaller towers, up to 60 feet (18 m) tall. They were funded by a murage grant in 1313, a tax on particular goods imported into the town. By 1405, however, the walls had fallen into considerable disrepair and were incapable of preventing Henry IV from taking the town with relative ease.

Berwick Castle (an earlier structure) lay just outside the medieval wall to the north-west, and was connected to the town by a bridge leading to a gate in the wall.

=== Elizabethan rebuilding ===
Part of the Elizabethan ramparts

An additional, short-lived, fort was built in 1552 to supplement the walls. By 1560, however, it was concluded that it was impractical to upgrade the existing walls and a new set of town fortifications in an Italian style were constructed instead, destroying much of the earlier medieval stonework. Sir Richard Lee served as Chief Surveyor for these works; he came up with an innovative design, combining ditches and walls backed by substantial earthworks (designed to absorb the force of an artillery attack). The new walls were much smaller in length, enclosing only two thirds of the medieval area, allowing them to include more artillery emplacements and five large stone bastions. The 16th century walls included four gates. In the 18th century most of the remaining parts of the medieval walls were steadily lost.

The walls now run between later buildings in many places, like here at Shore Gate

=== The walls today ===
Today the walls are, in the view of archaeologists Oliver Creighton and Robert Higham, "by some measure the best-preserved example of town defences in Britain designed for post-medieval warfare". They are protected as a scheduled monument and a grade I listed building.

== See also ==
- List of town walls in England and Wales
- Caernarfon town walls
- Chester city walls
- Derry city walls
- York city walls

== Bibliography ==
- Creighton, Oliver Hamilton and Robert Higham. (2005) Medieval Town Walls: an Archaeology and Social History of Urban Defence. Stroud, UK: Tempus. ISBN 978-0-7524-1445-4.
- Forster, R.H. (1907) "The Walls of Berwick-upon-Tweed", Journal of the British Archaeological Association Vol. 13, pp. 89–104.
- Mackenzie, James D. (1896) The Castles of England: Their Story and Structure, Vol II. New York: Macmillan. OCLC 504892038.
- Turner, Hilary. (1971) Town Defences in England and Wales. London: John Baker. OCLC 463160092
