= Embleton Bay =

Coastal feature in Northumberland, England

Coordinates: 55.5033°N 1.6127°W

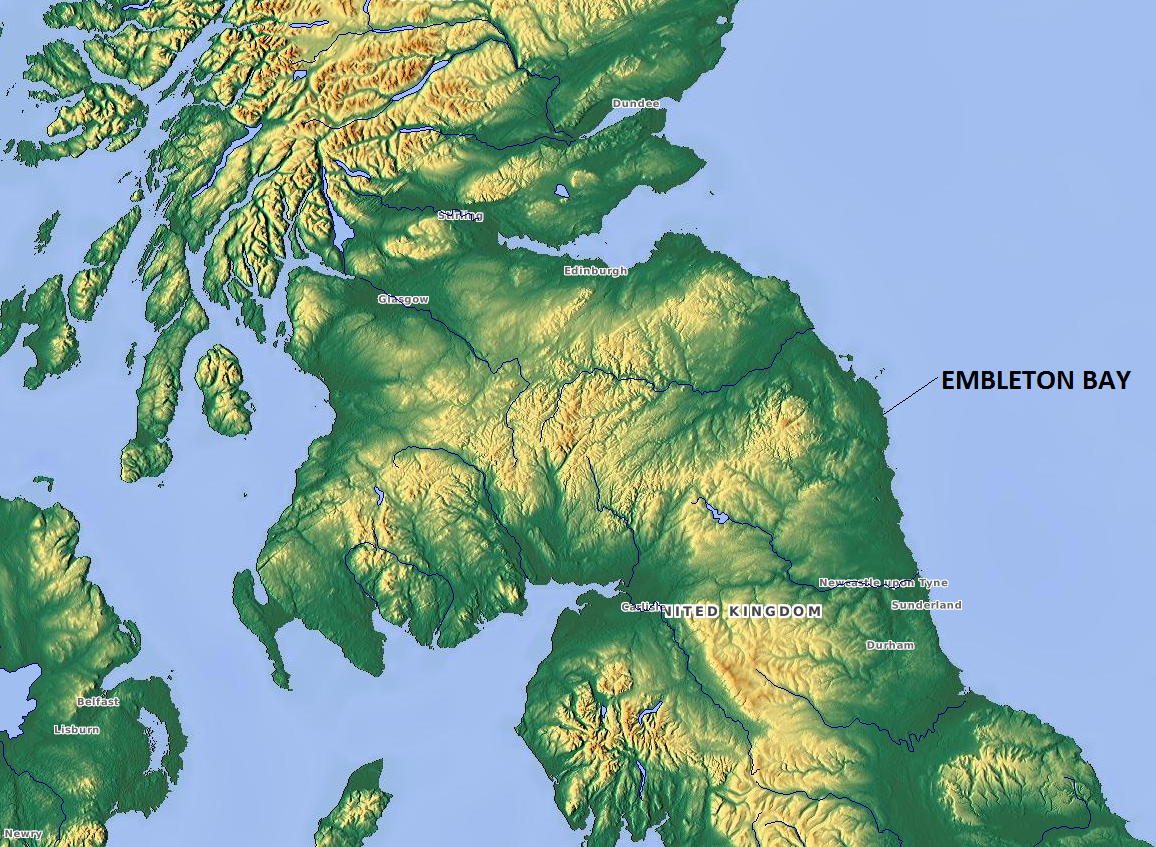
Embleton Bay location

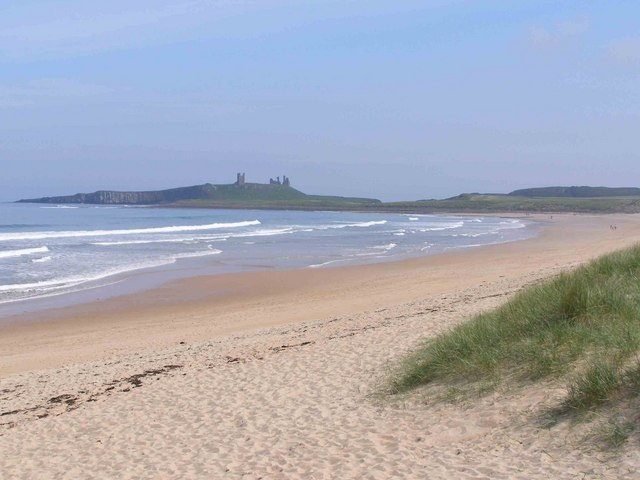
Dunstanburgh Castle as viewed from Embleton Bay

Embleton Bay is a bay on the North Sea, located to the east of the village of Embleton, Northumberland, England. It lies just to the south of Newton-by-the-Sea and north of Craster. Popular for paddling, it is overlooked by the ruins of Dunstanburgh Castle and by Dunstanburgh Castle Golf Club.

== Geography ==
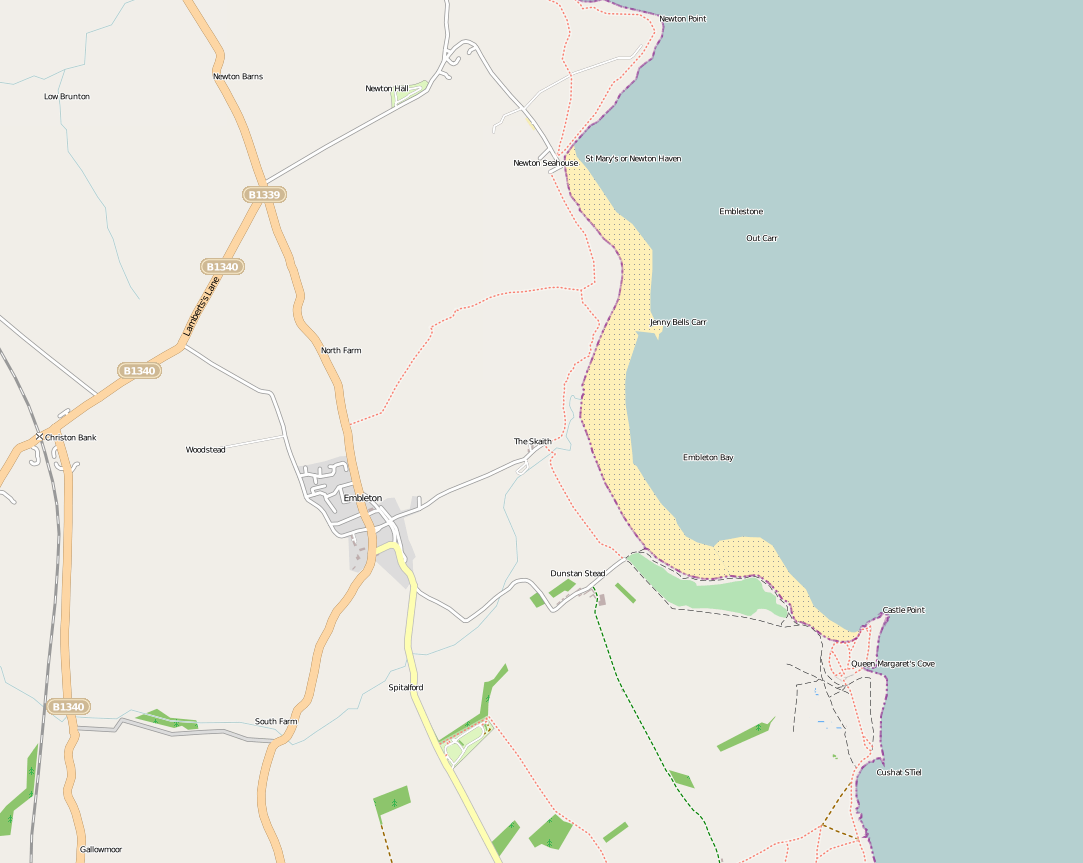
Embleton Bay local map

The beach has a whinstone reefs and the sand is a ruddy gold color. At its southern end, a castle is situated on a black cliff promontory. A little trout stream, known as the Embleton Burn, begins in the inland moors, makes its way through an area of the old barony, woody denes, and channels, before reaching the centre of the bay. The coast from Newton Seahouses to Dunstanburgh Point is made up of sandhills. Located on the North Sea, the bay is a good stopping place in offshore winds, and is formed by the points known as Out Car and Emblestone to the north and Dunstanburgh Point to the south.

The anchorage is in 6 to 8 fathoms (11 to 15 m). There is good holding ground, with Heifer Bank Tower and trees in line with Dunstanstead, at a bearing of 232°; and Beadnell Church Spire, open to the east of Newton Point, at a bearing of 335°. There is a dramatic boulder field.

== History ==
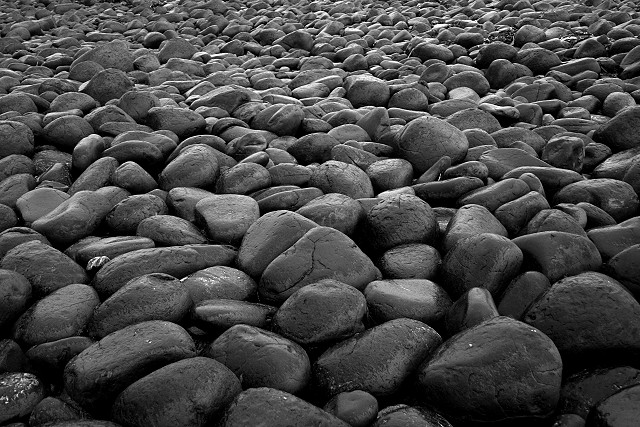
Boulders at Embleton Bay.

In the 1830s, a sandstone rock was discovered near the low tide mark on the Embleton sea shore. Carved on the rock in Roman capitals were the words, "ANDRA BARTON". "Andra", or Sir "Andrew" Barton, a Scottish sea captain and "fearless freebooter", was a mariner in James IV, King of Scots' navy.

== Flora and fauna ==
Flora in the dunes area include bloody crane's-bill, potentilla, eye bright, bedstraw, spring squill, wild thyme, and wild vetch, . Some of the bay's cliffs are a seabird site frequented by breeding eider ducks, fulmars, kittiwake, and shags. There is an occurrence of Atelecyclus rotundatus within the bay.
