= Hexham Old Gaol =

Municipal building in Hexham, England

Old Gaol, Hexham
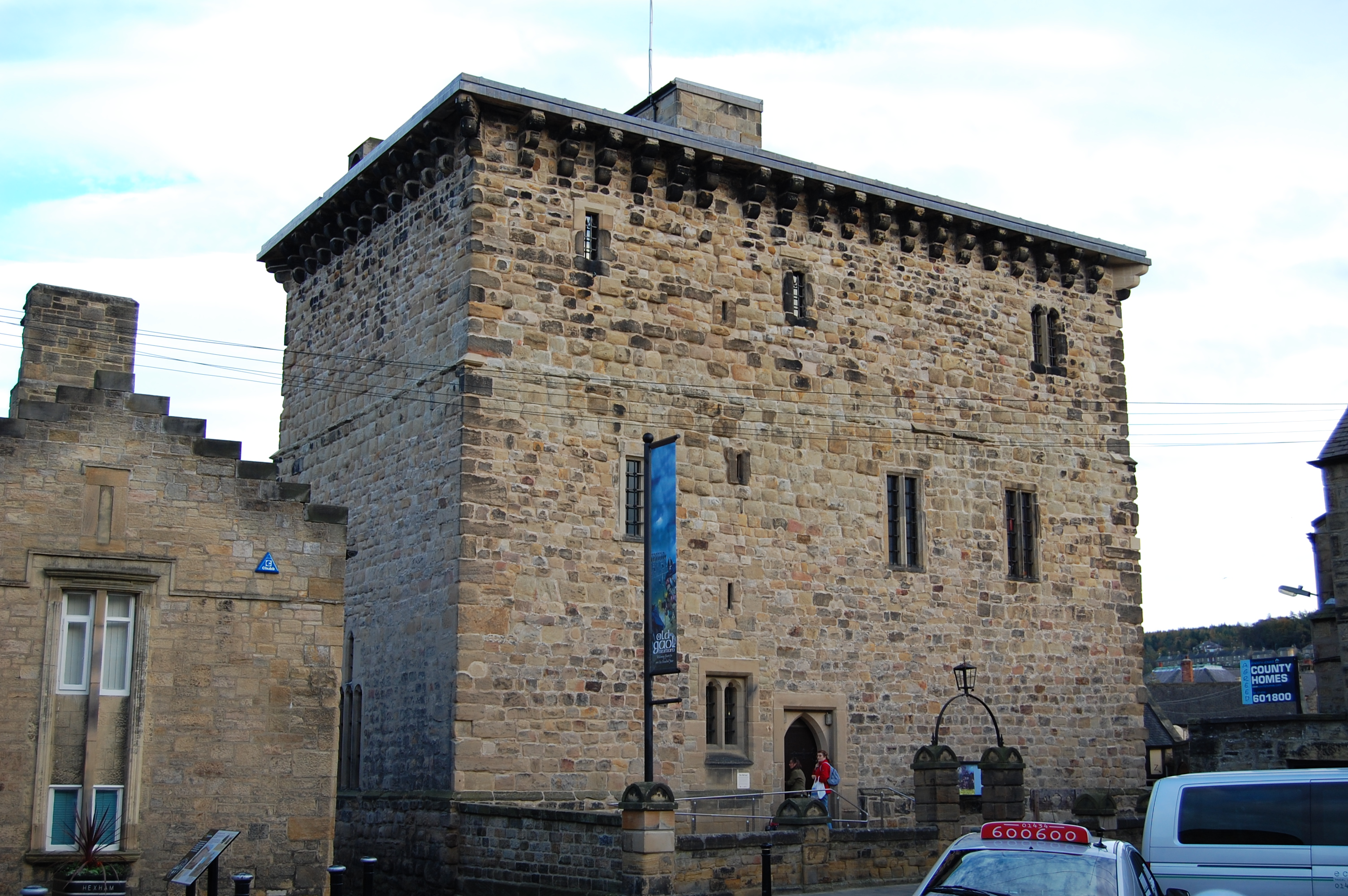
- Old Gaol, Hexham

- Shown in Northumberland
- 54.9713°N 2.0999°W
- Location: Hallgate, Hexham

History
- Built: c.1332

Site notes
- Architectural style: Medieval style

Listed Building – Grade I
- Official name: The Manor Office
- Designated: 2 October 1951
- Reference no.: 1281526

The Old Gaol, also known as the Manor Office, is a custodial building in Hallgate in Hexham, Northumberland, England. The building, which now operates as a museum, is a Grade I listed building.

== History ==
The gaol was commissioned by the Archbishop of York, William Melton. It was designed in the Medieval style, built in rubble masonry and was completed in January 1332.

The design involved a three-storey rectangular building facing onto Hallgate. On the ground floor, there was originally a doorway on the left: this was subsequently replaced by a bi-partite mullioned window with cusped heads, and a new arched doorway with an architrave was inserted in the centre. The upper floors were originally largely blind: new fenestration was later added to these floors: on the first floor, additions included two pairs of lancet windows on the right and a single lancet window on the left, while on the second floor, additions included a bi-partite mullioned window with cusped heads on the right and two small single windows on the left. The building was surmounted by heavily corbelled eaves. Internally, the principal rooms were the two vaulted cells in the basement. The spaces on the other floors were largely for the administration of the prison.

The building held prisoners from Hexhamshire and, in the 16th century, also from the English Middle March: the prisoners were held in the gaol on a temporary basis awaiting their trial in the courtroom in the nearby Moot Hall. The building remains one of the oldest purpose-built prisons in England.

During the Hexham Riot in 1761, when a crowd protesting about changes in the criteria for serving in the militia, rioters were fired upon by troops from the North Yorkshire Militia in the Market Place. Some 45 protesters were killed, and many others were incarcerated in the gaol. After the prisoners had been transferred to Morpeth Gaol, the prison closed in 1820. It was then converted for use as a bank and a solicitor's office.

The Old Gaol

The old gaol became the home of the 2nd Northumberland Rifle Volunteers when it was formed in 1860 and remained in use as such until Hencotes drill hall was completed in 1891. During the Second World War, it served as a fire lookout tower. The building reopened as a museum in 1980. Topics covered include archaeology, archives, costume and textiles, law and order, music, photography, social history, weapons and war. The collections include 15th and 16th-century arms and armour, and objects of local historical interest. The Border Library holds the "Butler Collection", which is a series of books, recordings and music relating to the culture of the Borders, assembled by the former Chairman of the Northumbria Tourist Board, William Butler.

== See also ==
- Grade I listed buildings in Northumberland
