= St Bartholomew's Church, Newbiggin-by-the-Sea =

St Bartholomew’s Church, Newbiggin-by-the-Sea
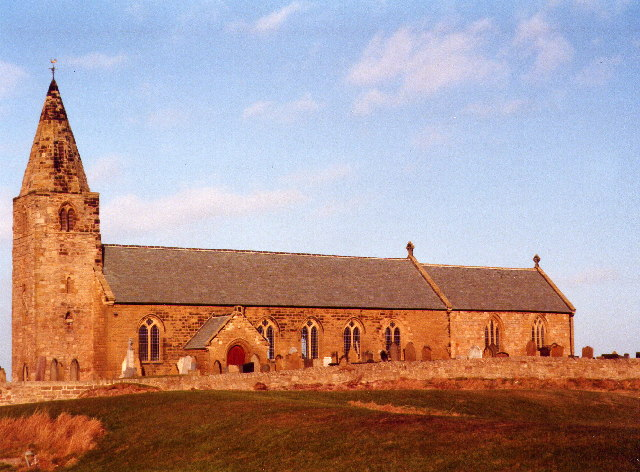
- St Bartholomew’s Church, Newbiggin-by-the-Sea
- St Bartholomew’s Church, Newbiggin-by-the-Sea
- 55°11′06.97″N 1°30′07.67″W
- Location: Newbiggin-by-the-Sea, Northumberland
- Country: England
- Denomination: Church of England
- Website: stbartholomewsnewbiggin.co.uk

History
- Dedication: St Bartholomew

Architecture
- Heritage designation: Grade I listed

Administration
- Province: Province of York
- Diocese: Diocese of Newcastle
- Archdeaconry: Lindisfarne
- Deanery: Morpeth
- Parish: Woodhorn with Newbiggin

Clergy
- Vicar: The Reverend Anthony O‘Grady

St Bartholomew's Church, Newbiggin-by-the-Sea is the parish church of Newbiggin-by-the-Sea, Northumberland. The building is part of the Diocese of Newcastle.

== History ==
The church dates from the 13th century and by the eighteenth century had become a ruin. The nave and chancel were restored in 1845, and a new chancel arch and organ chamber were built in 1898 by W.S. Hicks. The north aisle was rebuilt in 1912.

The church is noted for its dramatic headland site.

== Organ ==
The church had a two manual pipe organ by Nelson & Co. dating from around 1910. A specification of the organ can be found on the National Pipe Organ Register.
