= Haughton Castle =

Castle in Humshaugh, Northumberland, England

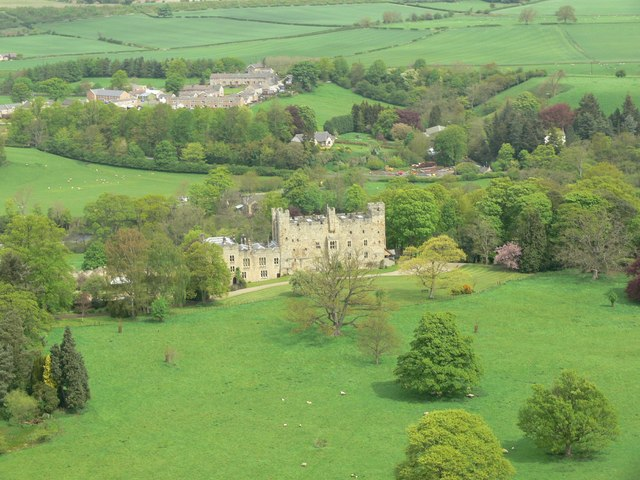
- Interactive map of Haughton Castle
- 55°03′02″N 2°07′48″W

History
- Built: 13th century

Site notes
- Owner: Braithwaite family

Listed Building – Grade I
- Official name: Haughton Castle
- Designated: 20 October 1952
- Reference no.: 1043027

Haughton Castle is a privately owned country mansion and Grade I listed building, situated to the north of the village of Humshaugh on the west bank of the North Tyne. It is around 5 1/2 miles (8.9 km) north of the market town of Hexham, Northumberland.

== History ==
It was built originally in the 13th century as a tower house and enlarged and fortified in the 14th century. At this time the castle was owned by Gerald Widdrington and, although the Widdringtons still owned it in the early 14th century, the Swinburns were living there.

By the 16th century, the castle fell into ruin and disrepair, and it was attacked by Border reivers. A survey of 1541 reported the roof and floors to be "decayed and gone".

The property was acquired by the Smith family in about 1640, but in 1715 a further survey stated the building to be ruinous.

Significant alterations were carried out for the Smiths between 1816 and 1845, latterly by architect John Dobson to convert the ruin into a substantial mansion. The Crawshaw family came into possession in 1862, and a west wing was added for them by Anthony Salvin in 1876. In the late 19th century it was acquired by the Cruddas family.

Part of the castle served as a hospital during the Second World War. It is currently owned by the Braithwaite family.

Some commentators suggest it is the location for the traditional song "Waters of Tyne".

== Sources ==
- Allsopp, Bruce; Clark, Ursula (1969). Historic Architecture of Northumberland. Newcastle upon Tyne: Oriel Press. ISBN 0 85362 062 8.
