= Embleton, Northumberland =

Village in Northumberland, England

Coordinates: 55.496°N 1.635°W

Embleton
- Embleton Church, late 19th century

- Location within Northumberland
- Population: 672 (2011 census)
- OS grid reference: NU231225
- Civil parish: Embleton
- Unitary authority: Northumberland
- Ceremonial county: Northumberland
- Region: North East
- Country: England
- Sovereign state: United Kingdom
- Post town: ALNWICK
- Postcode district: NE66
- Dialling code: 01665
- Police: Northumbria
- Fire: Northumberland
- Ambulance: North East
- UK Parliament: North Northumberland

Embleton is a village and civil parish in the English county of Northumberland. Besides the village of Embleton itself, the civil parish includes the settlement of Christon Bank, situated about a mile to the west.

Embleton village has a main street with one shop. There is a small green with the village pump on it, out of use now but at one time the source of the water supply. The village is about 0.5 miles (0.80 km) from Embleton Bay. The sandy beach is backed by dunes where a variety of flowers bloom: bluebells, cowslips, burnet roses and bloody cranesbill, amongst others. Also near the beach is Embleton's 18-hole Dunstanburgh Castle Golf Course which opened in 1900 and was updated in 1922.

Christon Bank lies on the East Coast Main Line railway, and until 1965 was the site of a station.

Beyond the bounds of the parish, Dunstanburgh Castle stands at the southern end of Embleton Bay. Close by, to the south, is the fishing village of Craster.

== Landmarks ==
Close by the church is Embleton Tower, a pele tower which was the vicarage until 1974.

The Creighton Memorial Hall is said to be the largest village hall in the county and is named after Mandell Creighton, who was vicar 1875–1884 and later became Bishop of London.

One road is named after the Embleton-born W. T. Stead, a journalist and social campaigner who died in the sinking of the Titanic.

== Religious sites ==
The Church of the Holy Trinity is large with several interesting features and is historically connected with Merton College, Oxford. Creighton, the vicar, had a poor opinion of the villagers:

"In many ways the moral standard of the village was very low, and it was a difficult place to improve. There was no resident squire, the chief employers of labour were on much the same level of cultivation as those they employed, and in some cases owned the public-houses and paid the wages there."

== Notable people ==
- Robert de Emeldon (died 1355), Lord Treasurer of Ireland, and a personal friend of King Edward III, was born in Embleton in the thirteenth century.
- Richard de Emeldon, who was Robert's cousin, and was later five times mayor of Newcastle upon Tyne and one of its leading citizens, was also born here.
- W. T. Stead, journalist and social campaigner.
