= Warkworth Hermitage =

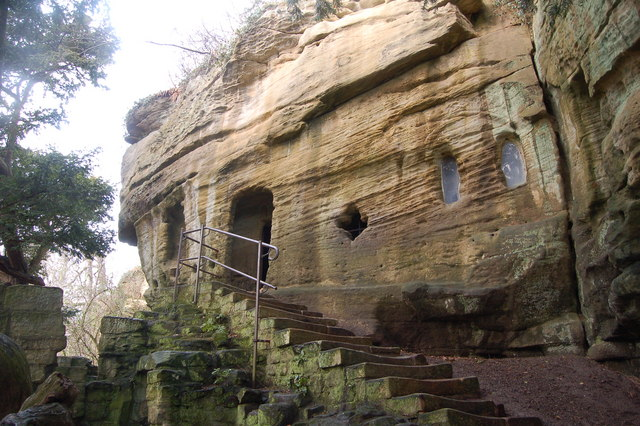
- Warkworth Hermitage

- Location within Northumberland
- 55.347°N 1.621°W
- Location: Northumberland, England, UK
- OS grid reference: NU241059

Site notes
- Owner: English Heritage

Listed Building – Grade I
- Official name: Warkworth Hermitage
- Designated: 31 Dec 1969
- Reference no.: 1041684

Warkworth Hermitage is a chapel and priest's house built onto and within a cliff-face on the north bank of the River Coquet in Northumberland, England, close to Warkworth Castle and the village of Warkworth.

The hermitage consists of an outer portion built of stone and an inner portion hewn from the sandstone cliff above the river. This inner part comprises a chapel and a smaller chamber, each having an altar. There is an altar-tomb with a female effigy in the chapel.

From the window between the inner chamber and the chapel, and from other details, the date of the work is placed in the latter part of the fourteenth century, the characteristics being late Decorated. The traditional story of the origin of the hermitage, attributing it to one of the Bertrams of Bothal Castle in this county, is told in Bishop Percy's 1771 ballad The Hermit of Warkworth. The ballad is fiction as the chapel was built as a chantry and occupied by a series of clergy from 1489 to 1536; since that time it has remained as it is today.

The carving in the window is a nativity scene; the female is Mary with the newborn child at her breast. The item at her feet is the head of a bull, and the figure at her shoulder is an angel.

Warkworth Hermitage is in the care of English Heritage, who provide its only public access, a ferry boat from the riverside path below the castle. The ferry point is about 1/2 mile (0.80 km) upstream from the castle. The hermitage, which English Heritage manages together with the castle, is open to the public during the summer season.

== Gallery ==
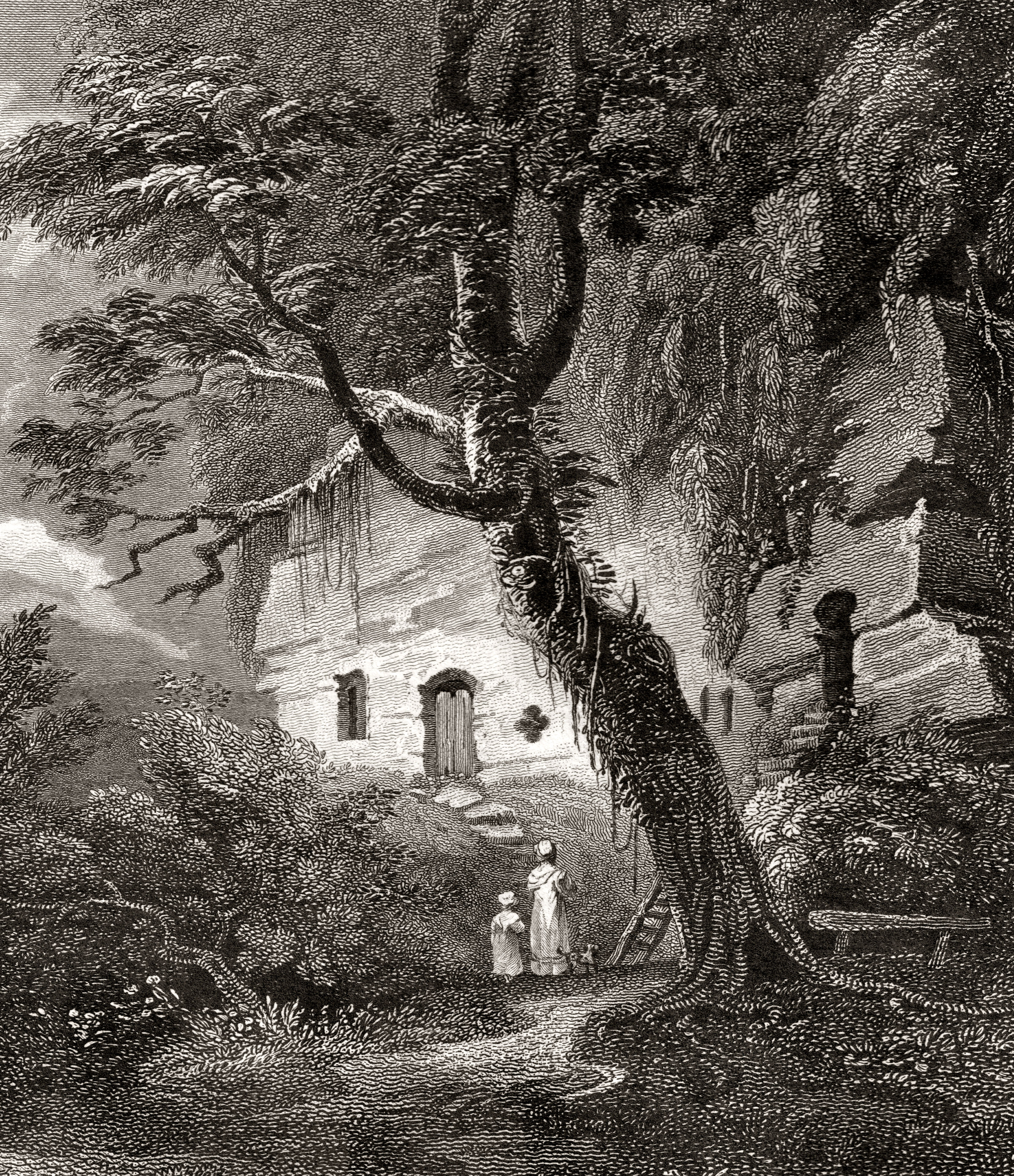
Warkworth Hermitage circa 1814

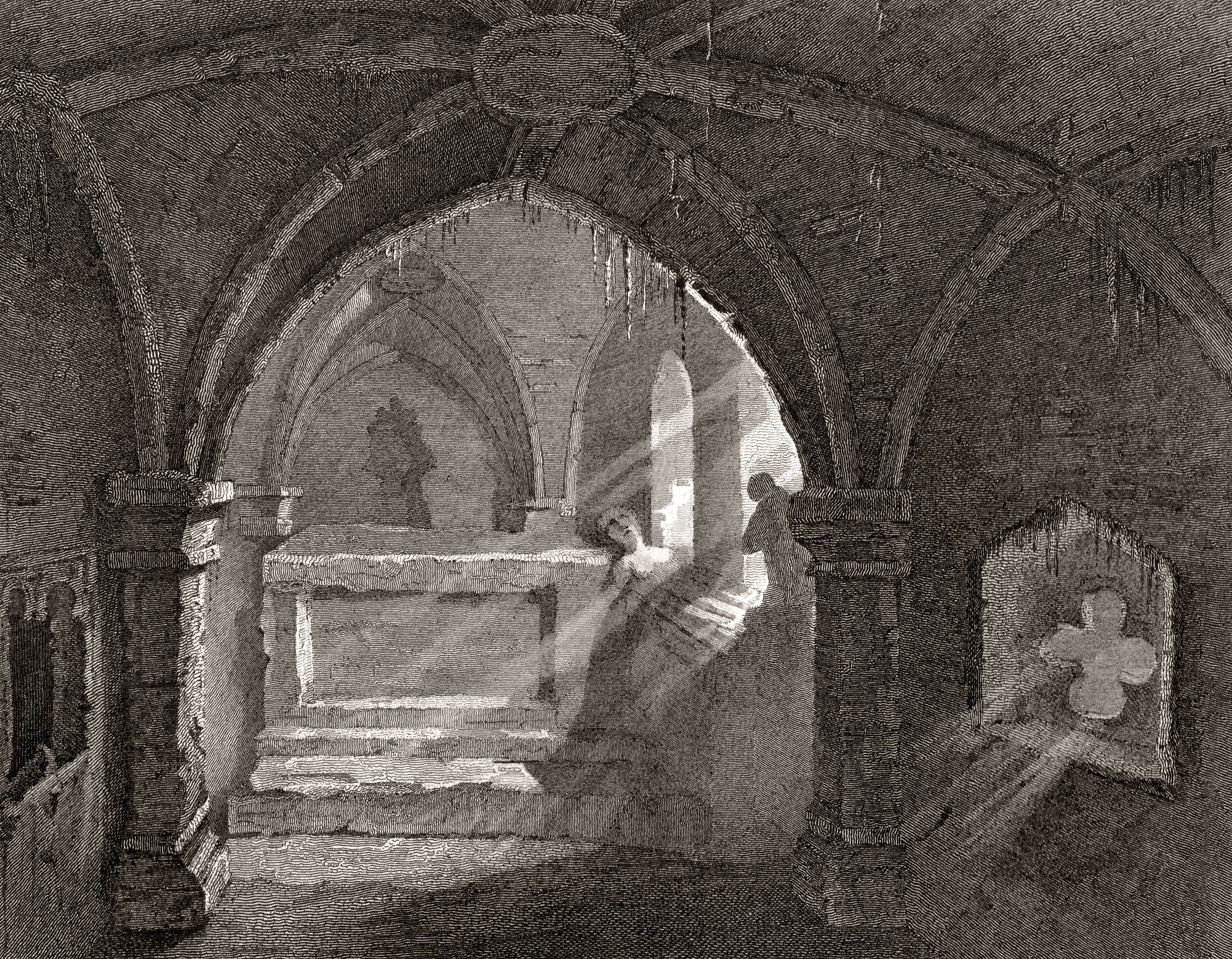
The interior of the hermitage in 1814

== In Art and Literature ==
Besides Bishop Percy's ballad mentioned above, the hermitage is the subject of Letitia Elizabeth Landon's poetical illustration Warkworth Hermitage to an engraving of a painting by Thomas Allom, published in Fisher's Drawing Room Scrap Book, 1836.
