= Felton, Northumberland =

Village in Northumberland, England

Coordinates: 55.298°N 1.707°W

Felton
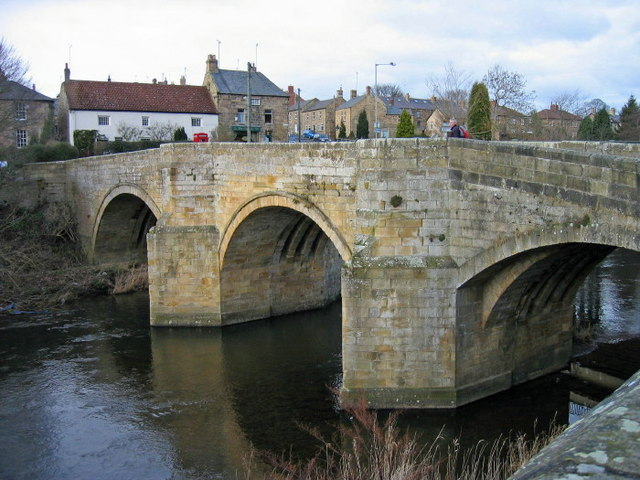
- Felton Old Bridge

- Location within Northumberland
- Population: 1,531 (2011 census)
- OS grid reference: NU185005
- Unitary authority: Northumberland
- Ceremonial county: Northumberland
- Region: North East
- Country: England
- Sovereign state: United Kingdom
- Post town: MORPETH
- Postcode district: NE65
- Dialling code: 01670
- Police: Northumbria
- Fire: Northumberland
- Ambulance: North East
- UK Parliament: North Northumberland

Felton is a village and civil parish in Northumberland, North East England, 8.9 miles (14 km) south of Alnwick and 12 miles (19 km) north of Morpeth. The nearest city, Newcastle upon Tyne, is 24 miles (39 km) south of the village, and the Scottish border is 37 miles (60 km) north of it. At the 2011 census, the parish had a population of 1531.

There are two bridges crossing the River Coquet. The older stone bridge dates to around the 15th century, while the newer concrete bridge was built in 1926. The older bridge is closed to traffic, and is often used for village events including wassailing at Christmas.

St Michael and All Angels church to the west of the village is a Grade I listed building.

== Education ==
Felton Church of England Primary School is for children between the ages of 3 and 11, after which they go to Duchess Secondary School in Alnwick.

== Sport ==
A speedway training track operated from Bockenfield Aerodrome near Felton in the late 1970s. Trainees participated in junior league type events against fellow Northern England and Scottish tracks. The venue is no longer used for speedway, however. It is now known as Eshott Airfield and is a base for flying microlights.

== Transport ==
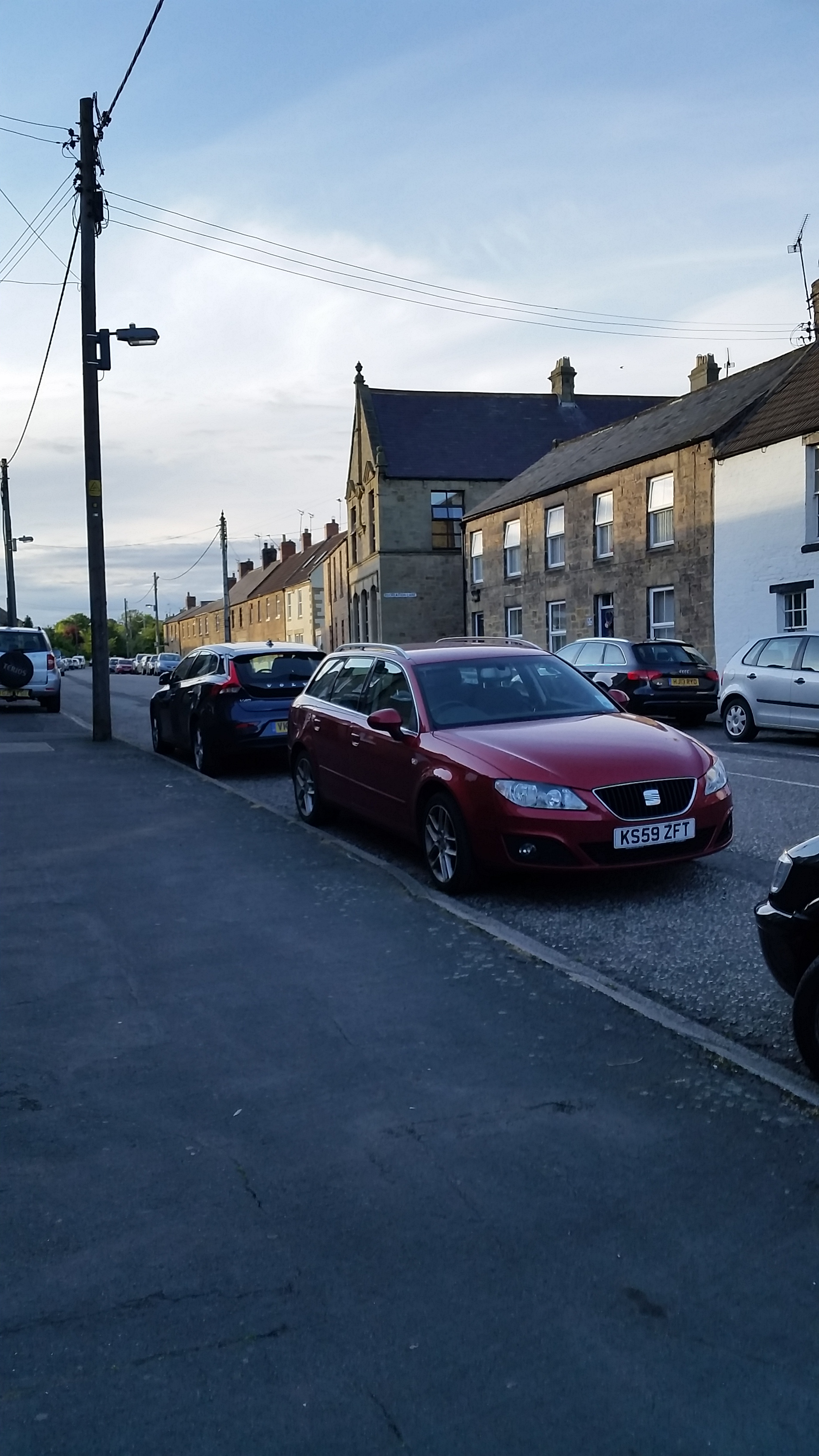
The large building in the centre is a renovated bank

=== Road ===
Felton lies adjacent to the A1, the main national north/south trunk road, providing easy access to Newcastle upon Tyne (24 miles south) and to the Scottish capital Edinburgh (100 miles north). The village was formerly on the Great North Road, later the A1, but was bypassed in the late 20th century by a new road and bridge over the River Coquet a kilometre to the west.

=== Bus ===
Felton has an hourly bus service provided by Arriva North East with routes between Alnwick and Newcastle. There is a 2-hourly service to Berwick.

=== Rail ===
The East Coast Main Line railway link between Edinburgh (journey time approximately 1:10) and London (journey time approximately 3:45) runs via the nearby Alnmouth for Alnwick station with a weekday service of 15 trains per day north to Edinburgh and 13 trains per day south to London. There is a very limited service at Acklington, which is slightly closer with trains south towards Newcastle and back to Acklington.

=== Air ===
Newcastle Airport lies around 45 minutes' drive-time away, and provides 19 daily flights to London (Heathrow, Gatwick, Stansted and London City), with regular flights to other UK centres. The airport also operates regular flights to many European destinations, along with destinations in Africa and North America.

== Notable people ==
=== Oliver Cromwell ===
The former main London–Edinburgh road, later called the Great North Road, passed through the village. A commemorative plaque on Main Street commemorated the stay of Oliver Cromwell when 6 Main Street formed part of a coaching inn called "The Old Angel". The building is believed to date from around 1631 and in 1650 Oliver Cromwell was reputed to have stayed there on his way to the Battle of Dunbar.

=== E.M. Forster ===
The novelist E.M. Forster's Uncle Willie lived at Acton House, just north of Felton. Forster spent part of the summer with him for several years around 1900. He wrote a letter from there on 27 July 1899, when aged twenty:

Yesterday I went to Bamborough (sic) saw the castle and tombs of my ancestors – I've no reason to suppose they are, though the name is the same and the arms similar, but Bamborough is such a nice cradle for one's race that I shall always call them mine. Then I paddled on the deserted beach...

Forster used Acton House as a model for Cadover in his novel The Longest Journey (1907). This was Forster's most autobiographical work, in which the character of Mrs Failing owes something to Uncle Willie.

=== Noble families ===
The Northumbrian family of Acton with estates at Felton had a dynasty of MPs in the 14th and 15th centuries, with William Acton, his sons William Jr and Laurence and grandson Laurence Jr all serving the Newcastle-upon-Tyne constituency. In addition to the Acton family, Felton is the place of origin of the eponymous Felton family.
