= Berwick Barracks =

Former military installation

- Berwick-upon-Tweed
- Berwick Barracks

Site information
- Type: Barracks
- Owner: English Heritage

Location
- Location within Northumberland
- Coordinates: 55°46′16″N 02°00′04″W

Site history
- Built: 1717–1721
- Built for: War Office
- In use: 1721-Present

Berwick Barracks, sometimes known as Ravensdowne Barracks, is a former military installation of the British Army in Berwick-upon-Tweed, England.

== History ==
The barracks were built between 1717 and 1721 by Nicholas Hawksmoor for the Board of Ordnance to protect the town during the Jacobite risings. The work, which involved two parallel blocks of military accommodation, was supervised by Captain Thomas Phillips. An additional block was added between 1739 and 1741. After the Napoleonic Wars the barracks were abandoned but put back into use in the 1850s.

Entrance gate

Following the Childers Reforms, the barracks became the depot of the King's Own Scottish Borderers, who arrived from Fulford Barracks in July 1881. The regiment moved out of the barracks in 1963 and they are now maintained by English Heritage.

== Museum ==
The museum hosts an exhibition entitled "By Beat of Drum" which shows the life of the British infantryman. It also houses the last colours of the King's Own Scottish Borderers before it was amalgamated into the Royal Regiment of Scotland in 2006.

=== Historic listing designations ===
The entrance gateway to the barracks on the Parade, and the attached guardhouse are Grade I listed structures. The West Barracks, the East Barracks, and the Clock House are also listed, all at Grade I.
