= Norhamshire =

Norhamshire was an exclave of County Durham in England. It was first mentioned in 995, when it formed part of the lands of the priory at Lindisfarne. When the lands north of the River Tees were partitioned into Northumberland and County Durham it, along with Bedlingtonshire and Islandshire, stayed under the jurisdiction of Durham despite being north of the River Tyne.

This situation persisted until the Counties (Detached Parts) Act 1844, when it became the Hundred of Norham in Northumberland, to which it had already been united for Parliamentary purposes by the Reform Act 1832. The district originally was the single parish of Norham, which had various townships - the townships became separate civil parishes in 1866. The parishes of Norhamshire were:

- Cornhill-on-Tweed
- Duddo
- Felkington
- Grindon
- Horncliffe
- Loanend
- Longridge
- Norham Mains
- Norham
- Shoreswood
- Thornton
- Twizell

Elwick was also a (detached) township of the parish of Norham but was associated with Islandshire instead.
