= Borough of Berwick-upon-Tweed =

Administrative district of North-East England

Coordinates: 55°46′20″N 2°00′08″W

Berwick-upon-Tweed
- Former borough
- Shown within Northumberland
- Sovereign state: United Kingdom
- Constituent country: England
- Region: North East England
- Administrative county: Northumberland
- Founded: 1 April 1974
- Abolished: 1 April 2009
- Admin. HQ: Berwick-upon-Tweed

Government
  - Type: Berwick-upon-Tweed Borough Council
  - Leadership: Alternative – Sec.31

Area
  - Total: 375.21 sq mi (971.80 km^{2})

Population (2001 Census)
  - Total: 25,949
  - Density: 69.158/sq mi (26.702/km^{2})
- Time zone: UTC+0 (Greenwich Mean Time)
  - Summer (DST): UTC+1 (British Summer Time)
- ONS code: 35UC
- Ethnicity: 99.6% White
- Website: berwick-upon-tweed.gov.uk

Berwick-upon-Tweed was a local government district and borough in Northumberland in the north-east of England, on the border with Scotland. The borough had a resident population of 25,949 according to the 2001 census, which also notes that it is the most ethnically homogeneous in the country, with 99.6% of the population recording themselves in the 2001 census as White. It was also the least populated district in England with borough status, and the third-least densely populated local government district (after Eden and Tynedale).

Its main town is Berwick-upon-Tweed, sited immediately to the north of the Tweed estuary. The town is ancient, the scene of a number of battles; it has perhaps the best remaining example of a (almost completely intact) town wall, built for defensive purposes.

On the south of the estuary, the port of Tweedmouth is the point of export of diverse goods, but especially grain and roadstone. The remainder of the borough is rural, bordered to the west by the Cheviot Hills, and to the east by a scenic coastline.

The borough was formed on 1 April 1974 by the merger of the previous borough of Berwick-upon-Tweed with Belford Rural District, Glendale Rural District and Norham and Islandshires Rural District.

Berwick was the first district in Britain to hold a referendum on whether to have a directly elected mayor. This referendum, on 7 June 2001, decided against an elected mayor.

The borough was abolished as part of the 2009 structural changes to local government in England effective from 1 April 2009 with responsibilities being transferred to Northumberland County Council, a unitary authority.

== Settlements and parishes ==
The borough contained the settlements and civil parishes of: (towns highlighted in bold)

- Adderstone with Lucker, Akeld, Ancroft
- Bamburgh, Beadnell, Belford, **Berwick-upon-Tweed**, Bewick, Bowsden, Branxton
- Carham, Chatton, Chillingham, Cornhill-on-Tweed
- Doddington, Duddo
- Earle, Easington, Ellingham, Ewart
- Ford
- Holy Island, Horncliffe
- Ilderton, Ingram
- Kilham, Kirknewton, Kyloe
- Lilburn, Lowick
- Middleton, Milfield
- Norham, North Sunderland
- Ord
- Roddam
- Shoreswood
- **Wooler**, Wark on Tweed

== See also ==
- Berwick-upon-Tweed Borough Council elections
