= Scremerston =

Village in Northumberland, England

Coordinates: 55.738°N 1.993°W

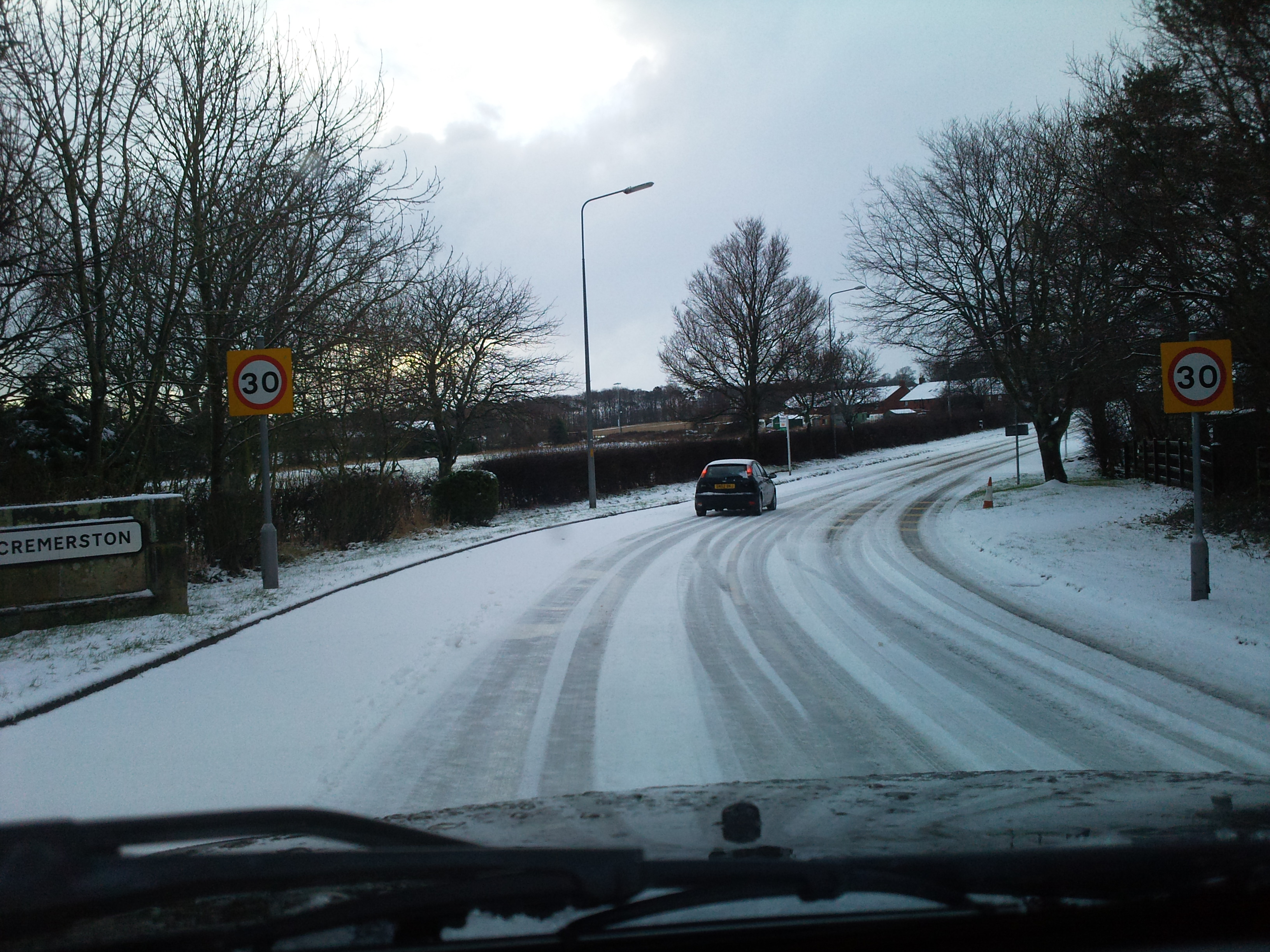
- Old A1 running through Scremerston

- Location within Northumberland
- OS grid reference: NU005495
  - London: 302 mi (486 km)
- Civil parish: Ancroft
- Unitary authority: Northumberland
- Ceremonial county: Northumberland
- Region: North East
- Country: England
- Sovereign state: United Kingdom
- Post town: BERWICK-UPON-TWEED
- Postcode district: TD15
- Dialling code: 01289
- Police: Northumbria
- Fire: Northumberland
- Ambulance: North East
- UK Parliament: North Northumberland
- Website: Ancroft Parish Council

Scremerston is a village in Northumberland, England. The village lies on the North Sea coast just under 2.5 miles (4 km) south of Berwick-upon-Tweed and 4.3 miles (7 km) from the Anglo-Scottish border. It is adjacent to the A1, providing access to Newcastle upon Tyne to the south, and to Edinburgh to the north.

Scremerston encompasses a number of satellite settlements scattered between the A1 and the coastline at Cocklawburn Beach. These include Borwell, Heatherytops, Inlandpasture, Redhouse, Scremerston Town Farm and Seahouse. Surviving miners' cottages include Restoration Cottages, Deputy Row and Derwentwater Terrace. Scremerston Hill farm and cottages lie 1 mile (1.6 km) to the south, but have been largely cut off from the village by the busy A1 road.

== Name ==
=== Toponymy ===
Scremerston has appeared in records at least as early as 1131. It has been written as Scrimestan, Scremerestone, Scremeston, Skremerstone, Screymerston and Scrymmerstone, making it a difficult name to interpret precisely. The first element is most likely a personal name such as Skirmer or Skurmer from the Old French escrimeur meaning "fencer" or the Old Norse personal name Skraema. The second element probably refers to either the Old English stán meaning rock or stone or the Old English tūn meaning an enclosure, farmstead or village. Hence a variation of Skrimer's boundary-stone, Skrimer's farm, Skraema's Stone, Skraema's Farm, etc.

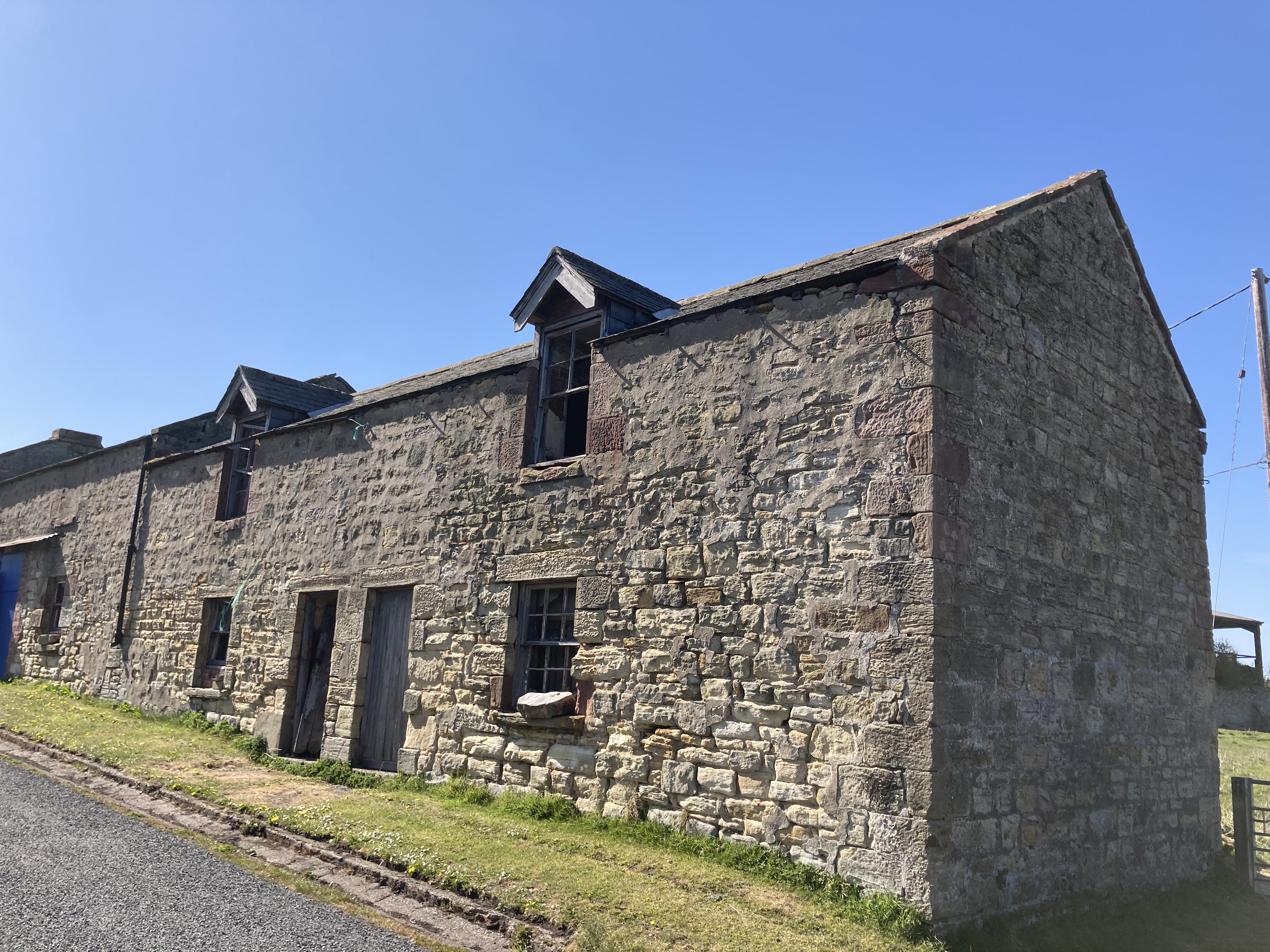
Old cottages at the original village of Scremerston, now known as Scremerston Town Farm.

=== Richardson's Stead ===
Prior to the 1957 edition, the village appeared on Ordnance Survey maps as 'Richardson's Stead', with 'Scremerston' referring to the wider area and a specific settlement just under 1 mile (1.6 km) south, now known as Scremerston Town Farm. Naturalist George Johnston, in his 1829 publication Flora of Berwick-upon-Tweed, refers to 'Richardson's-stead' and 'Scrammerston' as distinct places between which common barberry can be found. By the turn of the 20th century there was ambiguity, as typified by author and illustrator Charles George Harper when describing his journey up the Great North Road (the forerunner of the current A1) first published in 1901: "Always upwards, it passes collieries, the 'Cat' inn, and the hamlet of Richardson's Stead or Scremerston, whence, arrived at the summit of Scremerston Hill, the way down into Tweedmouth and across the Tweed into Berwick is clear."

== History ==
=== Neolithic and Bronze Age settlements ===
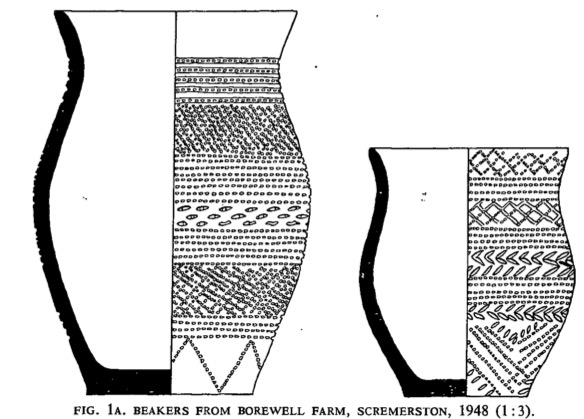
Drawings of the beakers discovered near Scremerston in 1948

Evidence of habitation during this period is scarce but not insignificant, and includes both domestic pottery and burial sites. Two cists were found in Scremerston about 120 yards (110 m) north-west of Borewell, one in 1922 the other in 1948. The cists had been inserted at the south end of a low, sandy ridge. The first cist, made of thin sandstone slabs, measured 1.2 metres (3.9 ft) square and contained a female skull, fragments of a beaker and two flints. The second cist was of similar size and contained two beakers which are held at the Great North Museum: Hancock.

A sherd of a Bronze Age food urn was found at Scremerston Hill in 1925 and is held by National Museums Scotland.

=== The Iron Age and Roman-British settlements ===
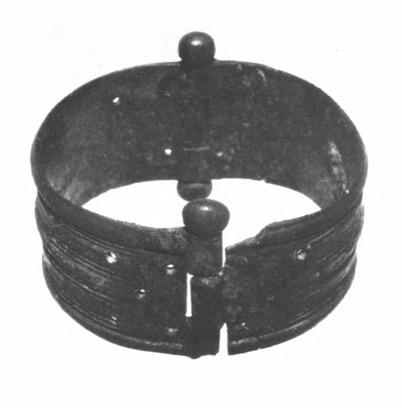
A Romano-British hinged bracelet found at Doubstead Field, Scremerston, Northumberland during an excavation by George Jobey in 1980.

A multivallate fort is recorded on the cliffline 1/5 mile (0.32 km) north of Seahouse. Three arcs of ditch enclose an area about 150 m across. The site is dissected by a railway line and the eastern end has not been identified and has most likely been lost to erosion of the cliff. About 150 m to the west of the fort lies a linear feature running north–south for 400 m while 80 m further west a similar feature runs parallel for nearly 500 m. These have been interpreted as the north–south axes of a field system associated with the site.

A possible ring ditch and two ditches measuring approximately 8 metres by 6 metres considered to be of prehistoric/Roman origins lie 100m north-west of the Spittal Chain Low radar site. Both of these sites are documented on aerial photographs of crop markings. Two much larger prehistoric double ditched curvilinear enclosures are visible as cropmarks on air photographs about 750m to the east of Scremerston Town Farm. Each has inner ditches of over 50m in diameter.

The Devil's Causeway is a Roman road extending 55 miles (89 km) across Northumberland from Portgate on Hadrian's Wall to Scremerston, disappearing just over 1 mile (2 km) before reaching the River Tweed. The route passes 1/4 mile (0.40 km) to the west of the Scremerston church, with all traces disappearing 2/3 mile (1.07 km) to the north east at Heathery Tops. The route was mapped during a three-year survey by Henry Maclauchlan, published in 1864. It has been suggested that the road's distinctive structure was designed for cavalry patrols rather than pedestrians or commerce, although no definitive evidence of Roman military structures has been found in the Tweedmouth area.

In 1980, a Romano-British settlement was excavated at Doubstead Field, 180m south of Scremerston village and about 90m west of the disused colliery railway. The site was later destroyed by the re-routing of the A1. During the excavation, traces of timber roundhouses were discovered in a rectilinear ditched enclosure, along with 130 sherds of pottery, various stone items, a hinged metal bracelet, a metal brooch, a spiral finger ring, fragments of glass bangles and skeletal remains of ox and horse. The site was dated to the late first or second century.

=== Medieval settlements and border wars ===
Scremerston is mentioned as the home of Robert De Tughale (Tuggal), sheriff of Berwick from 1333 to 1337. Tughale, in a petition to King Edward III in around 1335, requests that the King grant to him a tenement in the Shambles of Berwick due to his losses at the hands of the Scots. He states that his house at Scremerston had been burnt and his cattle taken by the Scots, his grain crop destroyed by the king's army. This was a particularly violent period in the area, with Berwick having been under siege by the English for four months and finally captured in 1333 when the surrounding area was noted to have been widely pillaged by Edward's army. Scremerston was destroyed again by the Scots in 1386.

Scremerston Town Farm, which is marked as "Scremerston" on many maps until the mid-20th century, was once the site of a larger medieval settlement and the remains of the earthworks and medieval ridge and furrow ploughing can still be seen. These are most prominent on the pasture between the farm and Doupster Burn to the north. Mid-16th century records mention that the village had a stone tower and enclosure, while 17th century records describe 40 cottages. Early maps show that they were arranged in two rows along a road running from east to west. The village began to shrink in the 18th century, with many of the remaining cottages used as agricultural buildings.

The remains of ridge and furrow ploughing is also evident adjacent to Inlandpasture, suggesting this largely Georgian farmyard was built over an older settlement.

=== Civil War, Treason and Greenwich Hospital ===
During the English Civil War (1642–1651), land seized from Royalists by Parliament's 'Sequestration Committee' could be 'compounded' – returned on payment of a fine. Documents of the Committee for Compounding with Delinquents showed that lands around Scremerston, including the village and Scremerston Colliery, were taken from William Fenwick for recusancy and were included in an Act of Parliament to be sold off.

Scremerston village, colliery and surrounding lands instead passed on to the Radclyffe family (also recorded as Radcliff, Radclyff and Radcliffe) by marriage. The Radclyffes were made Earls of Derwentwater (hence Derwentwater Terrace) in 1688 by James II, but following a Jacobite rebellion James Radclyffe, 3rd Earl of Derwentwater was beheaded for treason at Tower Hill in 1716. On the death of his son in 1731, the estate was forfeited and granted to the Commissioners of Greenwich Hospital in 1735, who retain most of the estate to this day.

=== Industrialisation ===
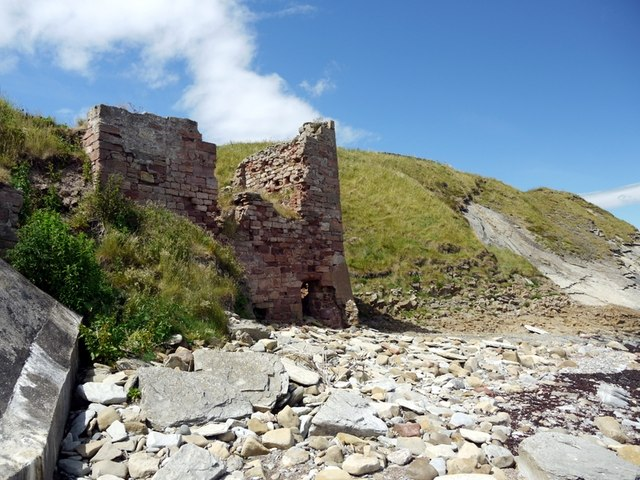
Ruins of Scremerston Mill, designed by John Smeaton in 1776 to house an unusual 'norse' water wheel.

During the 18th and 19th centuries Scremerston experienced rapid and extensive industrialisation, largely due to the accessibility of raw materials such as coal, stone and clay.

Scremerston Mill was a water-powered mill designed by renowned Leeds civil engineer John Smeaton in 1776. It was sited just north of Seahouse and the ruins are still visible. The corn mill was unique for having its own small harbour and an unusual horizontal "norse" water wheel. The mill is described in Rees's Cyclopædia as having a wheel 10 feet (3.0 m) in diameter with 12 "ladles" or concave paddles 14 inches (36 cm) in diameter. The wheel's axle rose up to a cog which could turn one of two sets of grindstones. The larger set would turn 65 revolutions per minute while smaller set could turn at 88 revolutions a minute, and the mill was capable of grinding 1 imperial bushel (36 litres) of corn an hour.

Hud's Head quarry, also known as Pier Quarry, lies between Hud's Head and The Skipper rock formation on the shoreline at the foot of the Scremerston Incline railway. It was active between 1808 and 1825 and was the source of the stone for Berwick Pier. The first stone of the pier was laid in 1810 and it was completed in 1826.

Scremerston was a local centre for coal mining from at least the 17th century. Records of the Committee for Compounding with Delinquents of 1650-52 show a colliery existed in Scremerston, although it had "drowned" and was "now useless to Berwick garrison". Following the village, colliery and surrounding lands passing to Greenwich Hospital in 1735, Nicholas Walton wrote to William Corbett, then secretary to the Greenwich Hospital reporting that the coal seam at Scremerston had been on fire for a number of years and, due to an increase in workings, a subsequent "admitting of Aire, has Increased, & is at present to that degree as to lay the workmen off work and unless some expedient is found the Collierys will inevitably be destroyed." A plan was described to block the levels and flood the mine to save it. Jack Tar Pit (also known as Scremerston New Winning, Scremerston Old Colliery and Greenwich Colliery) was sunk in 1840 by Robert Johnson and continued work until 1878. The site still includes a largely intact engine house and pumping engine house, both grade II listed buildings. The coal seams beneath Scremerston were intensively mined and four other major pits in the village were Scremerston Colliery, Engine Pit, Rise Pit and Restoration Pit.

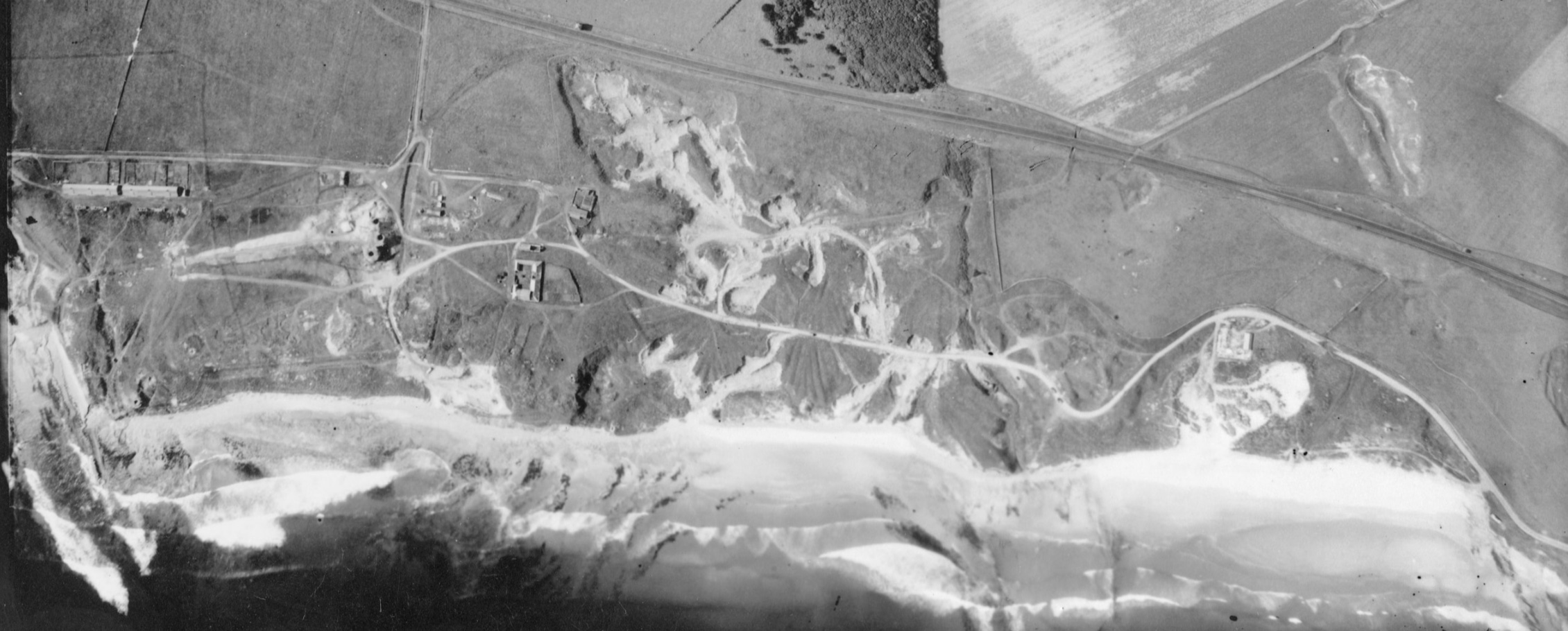
An aerial photograph of Cocklawburn taken by the RAF in 1941

A number of lime kilns operated along the Scremerston coastline. A lime works sat at each end of Cocklawburn Beach, while another operated from Cuddy's cove just north of Seahouse. They supported around 190 people in now vanished coastal communities. The kilns included an infrastructure of wagonways, blacksmiths and steam engines. Limestone was quarried on site and the quicklime was produced using coal mined in nearby collieries in Scremerston village. The lime works was served by two horse-drawn railways which operated into the 20th century, and connected with the mainline railway via a dedicated lime depot near Scremerston railway station.

Scremerston's earliest documented brick and tile works was on the cliff-top site of the later Sandbank (a.k.a. Sea Side) Limeworks, operating between the early and mid-19th Century and was known as Sea Side Brick and Tile Works. Scremerston Brick and Tile Works operated between 1850-1943, by Carr & Company from 1855, Shoreswood & Scremerston Coal Company from 1873 and Scremerston Coal Company from 1894 but closing soon after. In the mid-1930s, Hartley Main Collieries built new works beside the derelict works with four large 'Newcastle' kilns producing bricks marked SMC (Scremerston Main Colliery), but this was short-lived and the brick works closed with the colliery in 1943. Borewell Tileworks appears on maps contemporaneously with Scremerston Brick and Tile Works in a survey of 1860 but had disappeared by 1898.

Industrialisation brought with it a growing population and new facilities. By the early twentieth century the village had its own Workman's Institute and football pitch on what is now the site of Berwick RFC, and a bandstand situated behind Derwentwater Terrace.

=== World War II ===
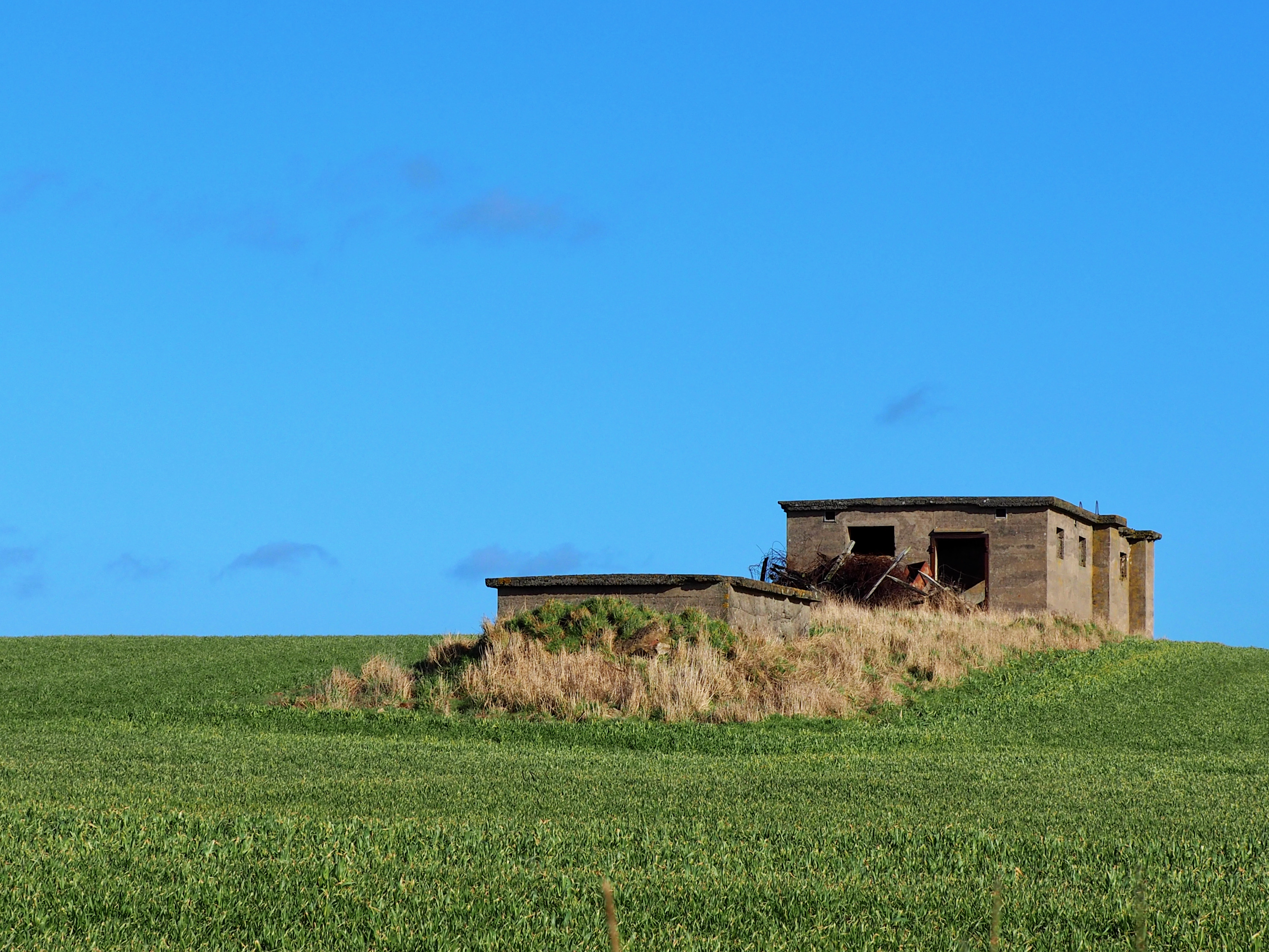
Spittal Chain Home Low radar station. The set house stands behind the half-buried generator building.

Scremerston was the site of Spittal Chain Home Low radar station during World War II and the generator building and set house remain largely intact to the north of the village.

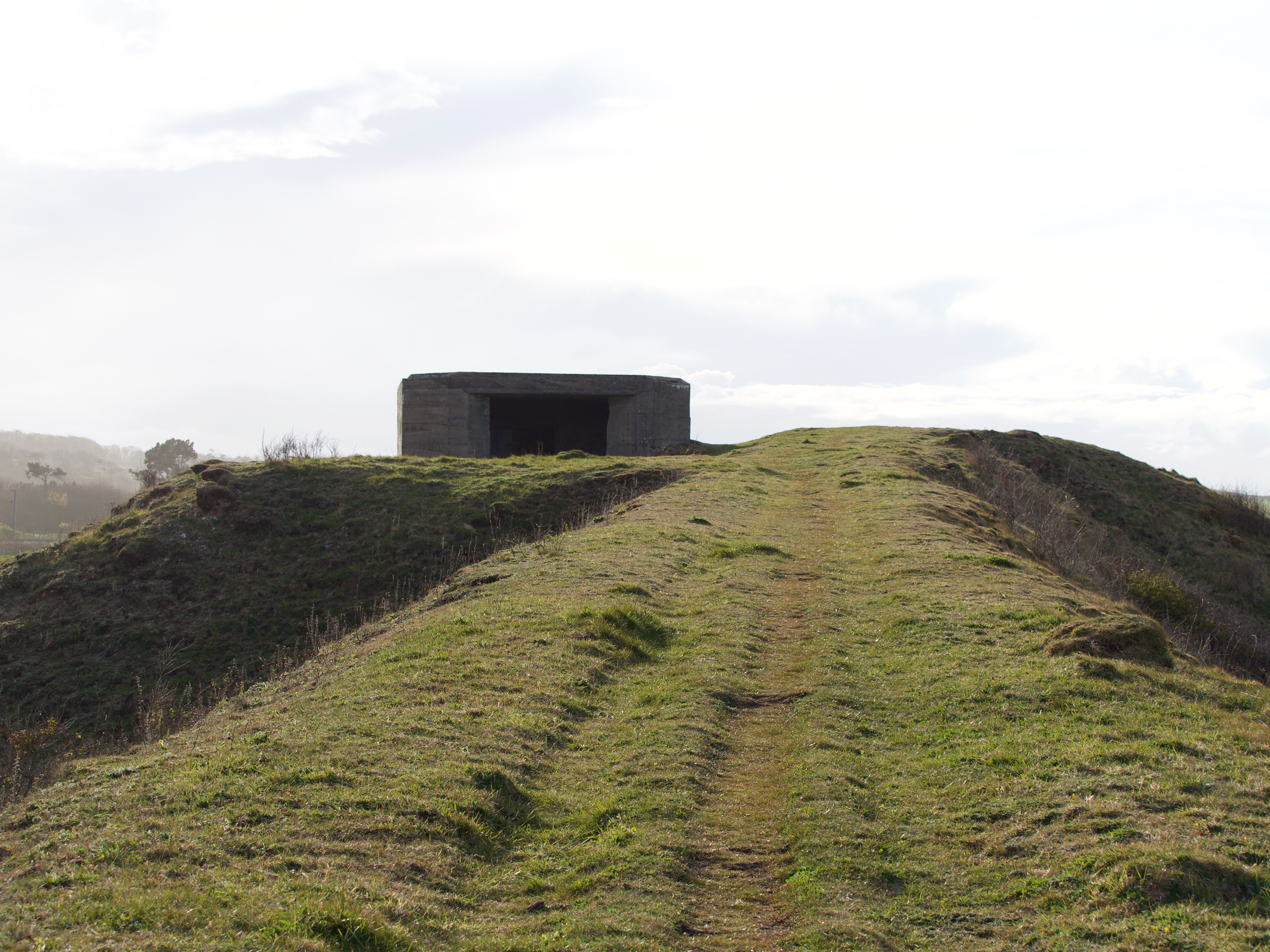
Scremerston Beach Defence Battery on a tramway ramp built to load the Scremerston Lime Works kilns

The Scremerston coastline was both defended and used for bombing and firing practice during the war period. A large concrete bombing range marker is sited on the clifftop above Saltpan Rocks between Seahouse and Cocklawburn Beach, although it is now buried. The gun house of Scremerston beach defence battery sits between Cocklawburn Beach and Cheswick Sands at the site of Scremerston Limeworks, which closed in 1910. The gun house sits on top of a loading platform for three limestones kilns which were still in place when the gun house was built, but later demolished by Northumberland County Council in 1981. The gun house faces Cheswick Sands and Lindisfarne to the south-east and overlooks a substantial earthen ramp which was once topped with the limeworks tramway. The tramway was hauled by an engine sat on the platform where the gun house sits today. A network of largely overgrown trenches leading to a small pillbox can still be found forward of the gunhouse.

From 1941 to 1944, Scremerston was an operational base for an Auxiliary Unit Operational Patrol. The Auxiliary Units were a secret network of volunteers who would undertake armed resistance should the UK have been invaded. The Patrol had eight members including a miner, a coal hewer, a butcher, a driver and several clerks and farmers. The Patrol was the first to be formed in Northumberland and met at the Cat Inn (now the Island View Inn) 1.7 miles (3 km) south of Scremerston on the A1 road. Their base was a cellar at Inlandpasture farm, the entrance hidden beneath seed trays in a garden cold frame. The patrol was very lightly armed and would have been responsible for sabotaging the local infrastructure such as the railway, A1 road and bridges over the Tweed. For much of 1941 the unit was overseen by Captain John Anthony Quayle who, on leaving the army, returned to his acting career and became a household name.

Scremerston was bombed from the air on 3 March 1941, and 5 February 1942, causing minor damage but injuring two people, one seriously. On 23 July 2006, a bomb disposal team detonated an unexploded World War II bomb in a field close to the village.

=== De-industrialisation ===
By the turn of the 20th century, much of Scremerston's industry was in decline. Local coal seams were becoming exhausted and labour-intensive industries such as lime production found themselves unable to compete against larger more mechanised plants elsewhere. The Scremerston Lime Works closed in 1910. Borewell Tileworks had already closed by the 1890s and the Scremerston Tileworks closed in 1943. In the previous year, Scremerston miners dug their own new shaft at Blackhill as the village colliery seams were finally exhausted. The Blackhill Colliery continued production into the 1950s, but finally closed after a well documented campaign to save it in 1959. 202 jobs were lost at the mine. Many of the miners then travelled to Shilbottle Colliery, 30 miles away, until the National Coal Board built them new houses and their families left Scremerston permanently. The last coal mined by Scremerston miners was at Allerdean Drift Mine, abandoned in 1908 and reopened privately in 1961 as an initiative of unemployed Scremerston miners. By the time it closed in 1967 it only employed 12 miners underground.

A number of streets and settlements have disappeared along with industry. These include cottages at Colliery Row, Old Hill and Electricians Row, with many families moving to housing built by the local council at the request of the National Coal Board in the 1950s. Salt Pan How, Philadelphia and Sand Banks were three clusters of cottages which sat along the coastline at Cocklawburn Beach when the coast was a centre of lime production. The last of these cottages was abandoned in 1956.

The site of Jack Tar Pit (also known as Scremerston New Winning, Scremerston Old Colliery and Greenwich Colliery) was noted by Augustine Henry as an early example of coalfield regeneration and afforestation, with the colliery, wagonway and spoil heap successfully planted as woodland in 1887 on the instruction of the Greenwich Hospital estate. The woodlands still stand and are known as Old Colliery Wood at the colliery site and Restoration Wood along the disused wagonway.

== Governance ==
Until 2024 Scremerston was in the parliamentary constituency of Berwick-upon-Tweed, but its constituency is now North Northumberland.

Scremerston sits within Ancroft civil parish. Prior to 1844, it lay within the ancient liberty of Islandshire, an exclave of the County Palatine of Durham. The Liberty is thought to date back to lands gifted by the Anglo-Saxon kingdom of Northumbria and originally extended from Budle Bay near Lindisfarne to Blackadder Water, a river in what was then Northumbria and is now East Lothian, Scotland. It also encompassed Northumbrian monastic lands up to the Firth of Forth. While much of southern Northumbria was conquered by Vikings and ultimately became the ridings of Yorkshire, the northern territories including the Scremerston area are thought to have remained unconquered, despite suffering many Viking raids. While this allowed for a degree of continuity of governance under local Earls and Bishops of Lindisfarne and Durham for many centuries, the Liberty was repeatedly overrun by armies from the north and south. Scotland expanded southwards, annexing all land north of the River Tweed, just 2 miles (3 km) from Scremerston, in 1018 but border wars continued until the nearby fortified port of Berwick-upon-Tweed changed hands for the final time, becoming permanently English in 1482 and moving the border with Scotland a further 2 miles (3 km) from the village.

Being south of the Tweed, the Scremerston area had effectively become part of England in 927 when Ealdred I of Bamburgh accepted Æthelstan as King of the English, but the local rule of Islandshire by the Bishops of Durham meant royal authority remained largely excluded from the area until jurisdiction was transferred to the Crown by the Durham (County Palatine) Act 1836.

Following the passing of The Counties (Detached Parts) Act 1844, Islandshire joined the county of Northumberland as a Hundred (or Ward). In 1894, Scremerston formed part of the Norham and Islandshires rural district under the Local Government Act 1894 which survived until 1974. It was abolished under the Local Government Act 1972 and Scremerston formed part of the Borough of Berwick upon Tweed until 2009, when the county of Northumberland became a unitary authority.

== Geology ==
The Scremerston Formation is a geological formation consisting of layers of sandstone, siltstone, mudstone and coal, with occasional thin dolomite or limestone beds. Sandstones make up about 50% of the formation and are white, grey, brown or reddish brown, forming beds that are typically less than 15 m thick, but are known to reach 60m thick in places. The siltstones and mudstone layers are grey or brownish grey and non-calcareous. About 5% of the formation is made up of coal seams, which reach up to 1.5 m thick. These geological layers, and a surface layer of heavy clay, defined much of Scremerston's economic history from the 17th century to the mid-20th century, with the principle industries being agriculture, brick and tile making, coal mining, quicklime production and quarrying for stone and clay. By the mid-20th century, only agriculture remained.

== Geography ==
Doupster Beck (also known as Doupster Burn), although only a small stream, is the largest water course in Scremerston. It runs from the A1 highway just south of Jack Tar Pit, directly to the sea. Although only 2.4 km long it changes name, becoming Cockley Burn as it runs through dunes at Pin Fold onto Cocklawburn beach. It emerges between two low rock outcrops known as Jock’s Linn to the north and Near Skirr to the south. The burn gives its name to Doupster Bridge - now little more than a culvert under the A1 - and Cockley Burn Woods on the inland side of the mainline railway. The name is most likely related to ‘Doubstead’ - a field close to the spring which contained the remains of a Romano-British ditched farmstead. "Doup" means "buttocks" in Northumbrian dialect and ‘ster’ has Old Norse origins, meaning field or enclosure.

== Demography ==
The population of Scremerston (including Cheswick) at the 2011 census was 606, living in 121 households. Ethnically, twelve people (2%) defined themselves other than white British, English or Scottish. About two thirds of the population described themselves as Christian, with the remaining third as not stating or having a religion. The median age of residents was 43 years old. Economic activity was primarily full or part time employment (48%), followed by self-employment (14%) of those economically active. Unemployment was 3.7%.

Census data shows a population in 1801 of 1,144 people. The population peaked in 1861 at 2,113 but by 1961 had more than halved to 1,012 and by 1981 had fallen to 825. The number of homes had remained fairly consistent between the 1840s and 1980s (317 homes in 1841, 333 in 1981) but the size of households had fallen from a peak average of 5.6 people per home in 1861 to an average of 3 in 1961 and 2.5 people per home by 1981.

== Economy ==
The main employment sectors for the area are skilled trades (21%), services including shops, hotels and catering, financial services and most public sector employment (13%), elementary (e.g. basic manual labour)(11%) and process and plant (e.g. factories) (11%). Some current and recent economic activities in the Scremerston area include agriculture, self-employed trades such as plumbing and joinery, tourism and holiday accommodation and retail.

Retail is limited and currently consists of a cafe and outdoors clothing outlet. Holiday accommodation includes a number of self-catering cottages and a small holiday park at Borewell Farm known as Pot-A-Doodle Do, which also incorporates a cafe, small shop and activity centre. Berwick RFC is based in the village with a large premises and runs activities for all ages. The only remaining public house is the Island Inn (formerly the Cat Inn) on the A1 1.7 miles (3 km) south of Scremerston village. The Miners Arms, to the north of the village on the route to Tweedmouth, is now a residential dwelling.

Scremerston is a former industrial village, and much of its growth in the 18th and 19th centuries can be attributed to a range of industries exploiting the resources of the Scremerston Formation. These included stone, lime, clay, sand and coal leading to industries such as tile and brick making, quarrying, lime production and coal mining. The area was also the site of salt pans, a water powered mill, ice houses for fisheries and a windmill.

== Landmarks ==
=== Buildings ===
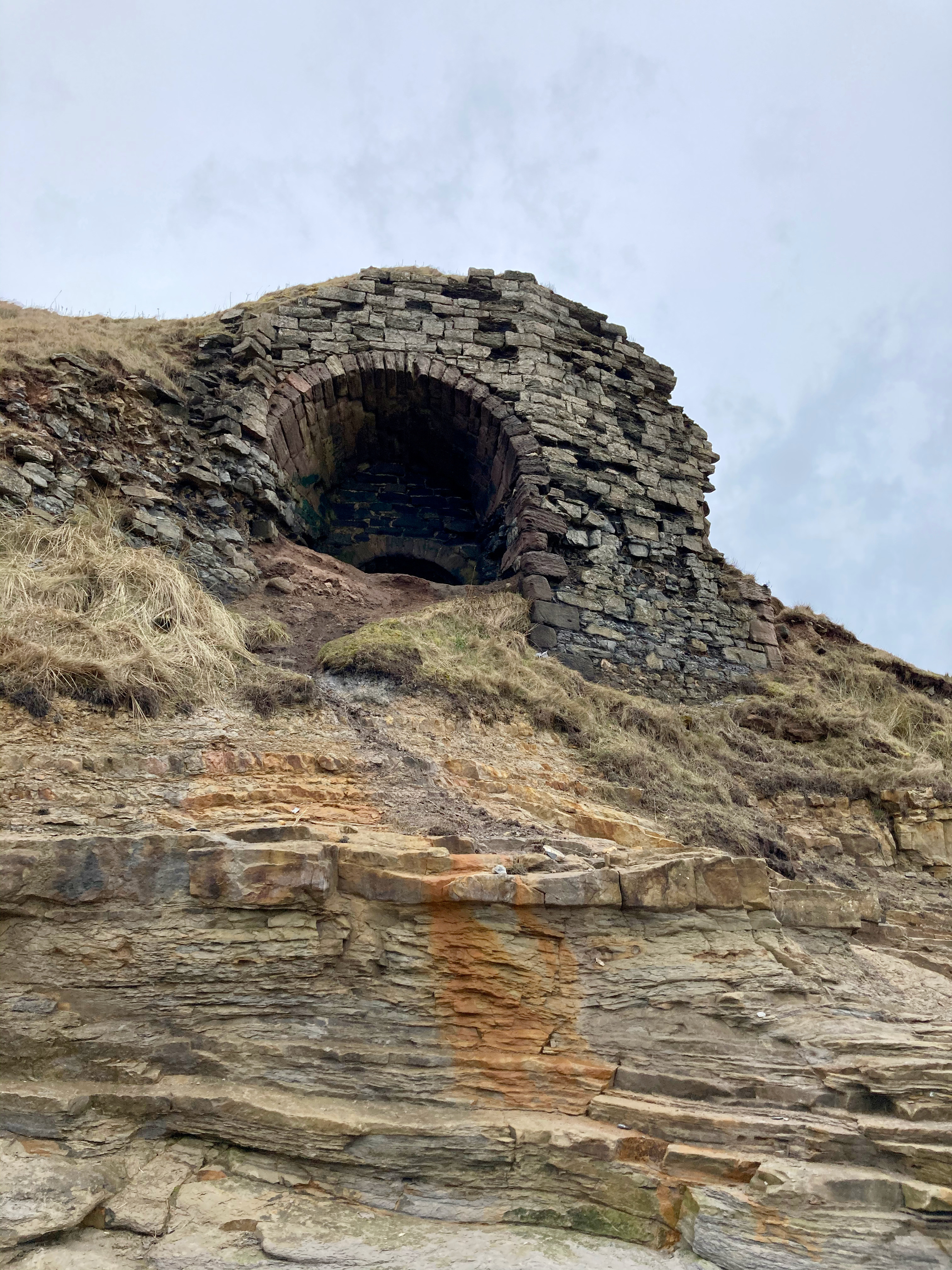
The remains of lime kilns can be found at Cocklawburn Beach

- Jack Tar Pit (also called Scremerston New Winning, Scremerston Old Colliery and Greenwich Colliery) lies to the south of the village and includes an engine house and a pumping-engine house built in 1840, both Grade II listed. The pumping engine house bears the inscription:

ERECTED AD MDCCCXL BY THE COMMISSIONERS OF GREENWICH HOSPITAL / JOHN GREY ESQ. RECEIVER / MESSRS JOHNSON & CARRS COLLIERY LESSEES / THOMAS FORSTER ESQ. VIEWER & ENGINEER / MR. W. ELLIOT, TWEEDMOUTH BUILDER.

- The buildings of Spittal Chain Home Low radar station, built during World War II, remain largely intact to the north of the village.
- The Church of St Peter is Grade II listed and was designed and built by Ignatius Bonomi and John Augustus Cory in 1842–43 in the 'early English style'.
- A Primitive Methodist chapel built in 1886 stands in the village and is now a dwelling. It was named the Brown Memorial Chapel after John Brown, a local "religious and political propagandist".
- The remains of several lime kilns survive in the low cliff faces at Cocklawburn beach.
- Kiwi Cottage is a Grade II listed Georgian house originally known as Poplar Grove.

=== Memorials ===
- A war memorial was unveiled on 8 May 1920 in commemoration of 14 local servicemen who died during the First World War. The memorial is located 150m south of St Peter's Church beside the main road. It was funded by public subscription and placed on land donated by the Lords of the Admiralty. The memorial is made of Aberdeen granite 5m tall in the style of a Celtic cross, ornamented with carved interlace patterns. Following the Second World War a tablet recording the names of five local men who died in that conflict was added at the base.
- A photographic memorial which originated at the Scremerston Working Men's Institute was originally kept in the Methodist chapel but was moved to Berwick Town Hall in 2004 after the chapel's closure. It is a single frame encasing 13 oval photographs and an oval sketch of the 14 local servicemen who died in the first world war, unveiled in 1920. A second similar photographic memorial was dedicated after World War II. Smaller copies of each are kept in St Peter's Church in Scremerston.
- A memorial commemorating miners of Scremerston Colliery stands at the entrance to the Berwick RFC. It consists of two coal ‘tubs’ or trucks standing on rails on a stone plinth.
- The top and bottom halves of a pedestal for a memorial to 'Major Johnson' can be found at the north and south entrances to the village, and now bear the village name. The memorial was erected 'by the workmen to the memory of their master' in an open area (now woodland) next to but pre-dating the Methodist chapel. By 1879 it was noted that the upper section "was unfortunately blown down during a severe storm". and by 1914 "nothing remains except the pedestal".

== Transport ==
=== Roads ===
The Great North Road passed through Scremerston and was the main coaching route used by horse drawn mail coaches travelling between London, York and Edinburgh. In the "Golden Age of Coaching", between 1815 and 1835, coaches could travel from London to York in 20 hours, and from London to Edinburgh in 45 1/2hours. By the mid-nineteenth century, coach services could not compete with the new railways and the last coach left Newcastle for Edinburgh in July 1847.

Much of the Great North Road route became part of a new route designated the "A1" by the Ministry of Transport in 1921, and the A1 passed through the village until 1983. The A1 is the longest numbered road in the UK, at 410 miles (660 km), connecting London, the capital of England, with Edinburgh, the capital of Scotland. While the Great North Road passed through villages and towns, the A1 was incrementally diverted around built up areas through a series of by-passes. Scremerston was by-passed in 1983 when the A1 was diverted to the west to avoid Berwick-upon-Tweed. This required a 195m bridge costing £9.5million to traverse the Tweed. The new route diverged at Jack Tar Pit (also called Scremerston New Winning, Scremerston Old Colliery and Greenwich Colliery) 600m from the village church.

The Great North Road / A1 once passed through the village ..

The mainline railway runs parallel to the coast in the area, making local vehicle access to the coastline only possible via a level crossing at the now defunct Scremerston railway station. An underpass at Seaview can be accessed on foot but the track is too steep and uneven for most vehicles.

=== Footpaths and cycle routes ===
The Northumberland Coast Path follows the local coastline at Scremerston. The route extends 62 miles (100 km) from Cresswell north to Berwick-upon-Tweed. The route is divided into six stages, with the Fenwick to Berwick-upon-Tweed section passing Scremerston being the longest at 12 miles. The coastal path also forms part of the North Sea Trail, a transnational long-distance hiking route that passes through seven countries. The total length of the trail is 3,045 miles (4,900 km) miles.

National Cycle Route 1 (NCN1) of the National Cycle Network passes through the area along the coastline, on the same route as the Northumberland Coast Path. The route runs for 1,721 miles (2,770 km) from Dover to Shetland. Locally, the route is traffic free from the southern approach until it joins the coastal road at Cocklawburn Beach. From Seahouse it becomes traffic-free again, although unsurfaced, crossing the Berwick-upon-Tweed boundary at Seaview. The cycle route also forms part of the EV12 North Sea Cycle Route which extends from Norway to Scotland via Sweden, Denmark, Germany, France and England. The coastal cycle route is the only designated cycle route in the area.

Access to the coastline is restricted by the mainline railway. A small bridge crosses the line between Seahouse and Seaview, but is not a public right of way and access is blocked. All of the unprotected railway foot crossings in the area have been closed due to safety concerns as the local speed limit for trains is 110 mph. The final unprotected foot crossing at Inlandpasture was blocked in 2020, leading to the disuse of sections of local public rights of way. The level crossing at Seahouse and an underpass at Seaview are the only remaining means of crossing the railway on foot in the area.

=== Railways ===
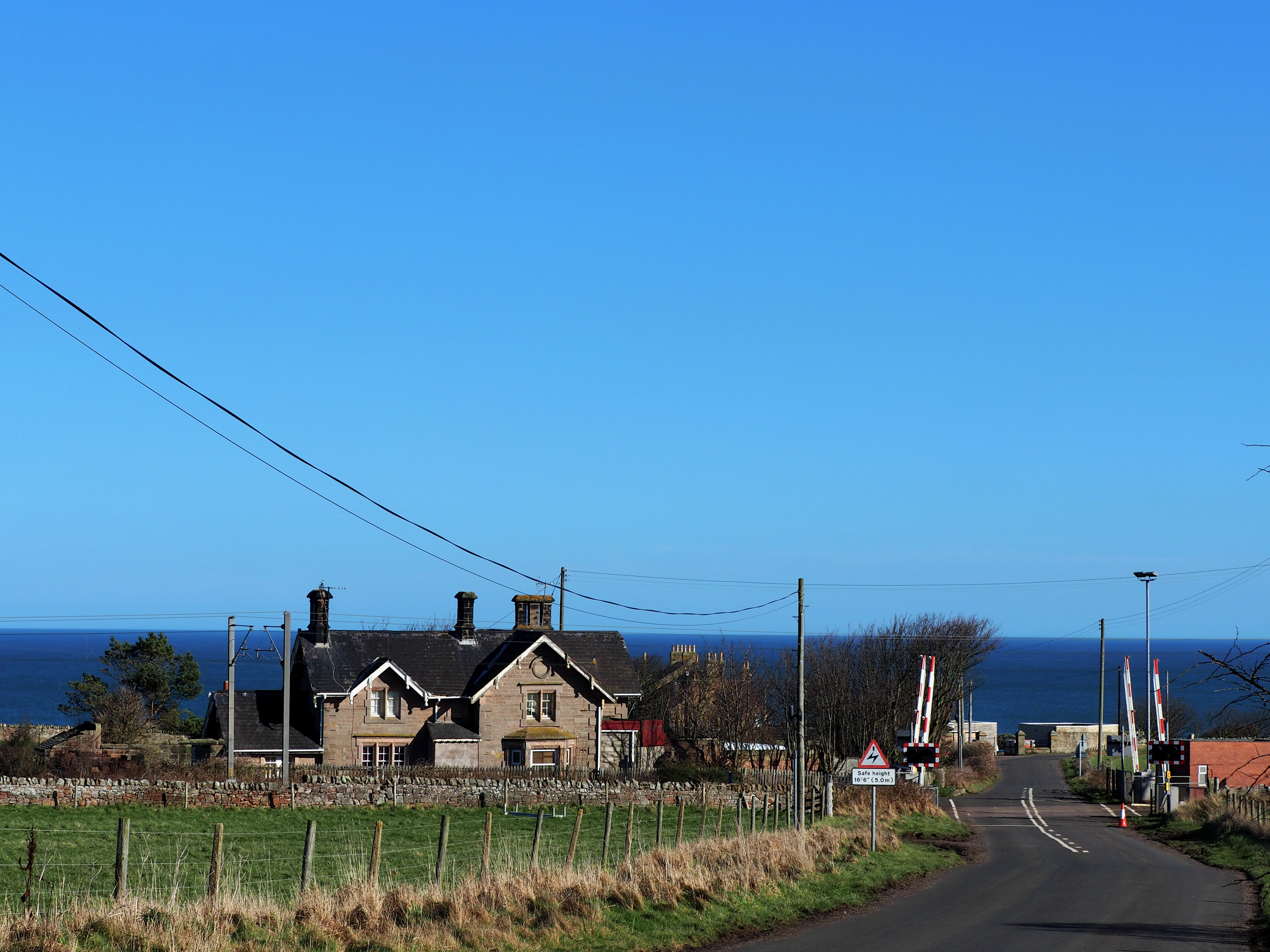
Scremerston station served the village until 1951. Just beyond the station is Seahouse.

The East Coast Main Line railway passes near Scremerston, and Scremerston railway station served the village from 1847 until 1951. The station was designed by the Newcastle architect Benjamin Green for the Newcastle and Berwick Railway Company. The station design was a slight departure for the architect, and has been noted for its more cottage-like appearance compared to other stations on the line. The building cost was £918. The station was closed in 1941 and reopened 1946. It was finally closed to all passengers on 8 July 1951. The platforms were demolished in 1959 and the station house has since become a residential dwelling.

The signal box, which stood on the opposite side of the road, was closed in 1981 and demolished soon after. Since 1960, it had only served the level crossing and once the gates were replaced with remotely controlled electronic barriers in 1980, it became redundant.

Scremerston's first railway, an early form called a plateway, was built of iron L-shaped plates on stone sleepers between Hudds Head quarry and Spittal for the transportation of stone for the Berwick Pier. It was opened in 1810 and was in part powered by gravity, bringing the wagons down off the cliffs - reputedly at high speed - and in part by horses to pull the wagons across Spittal to Carr Rock. Following the completion of the pier and a period of disuse, the plateway was re-utilised by the Scremerston colliery to transport coal, although its use was not strictly permitted. Once legal issues were resolved, the line was extended up to the Scremerston colliery (Restoration Pit) in 1824 and it is likely that at this time the 'plateway' was replaced with true rails.

This wagonway used horses to move coal to the top of a new incline, where rope controlled the descent towards the coast. The line was later extended across Scremerston to the Jack Tar/Greenwhich Pit and route remains fully passable as a public footpath from the Jack Tar pit buildings to the East Coast Main Line.

Scremerston Wagonway was a 19th century wagonway linking the Scremerston Main Colliery (SMC) and tile works to the Scremerston Incline and was operated until 1938 as an industrial railway using steam locomotives. From the SMC site, the railway crossed the A1 at Derwentwater Terrace to join the Incline at Restoration Cottages.

Scremerston Lime Works had its own wagonways linking the coastal kilns at Cocklawburn to the main line at Cockley Burn Woods.

Scremerston Tileworks located just north of Deputy Row had a single track railway from its clay pit to the brickyard. When the Scremerston Main Colliery was opened, a tramway was used to transport 'seggar' clay from the mineworkings to the kilns. Bricks were marked SMC after the Scremerston Main Colliery. A later brickworks opened by the Scremerston and Shoreswood Colliery Company used a horse drawn tramway to haul clay from a pit across the A1 (since diverted from the village) to the brickyard. The works were closed in 1943-44 and the tramway removed.

== Education ==
Schools in Northumberland use the three-tier system, and Scremerston has a ′First School′ for children aged 4 to 9 years old. The school has a capacity of 90 children, with an advertised annual intake of 18 per year. In 2021 the school had 63 pupils falling to 55 in 2022. In October 2022 a campaign was launched by local residents to save the school from closure with an online petition titled 'Save Our School!' on Change.org attracting 832 signatures by the end of 2022.

Scremerston children are required to travel to middle school from the age of 10 years, the nearest being in Tweedmouth. The nearest secondary school is also in Tweedmouth, though Scremerston children may also commute across the Scottish border to Eyemouth or Berwickshire to attend secondary school from the age of 14 years.

Prior to the current First School opening in 1974, teaching took place in Scremerston County First School which opened in 1842. This older school building is now a residential dwelling.

== Religious sites ==
The Anglican church of St. Peter's, built in the Early English style, was consecrated in 1842. A Primitive Methodist chapel built in 1886 at a cost of nearly £400 is now a residential dwelling. A Kingdom Hall of Jehovah’s Witnesses was built 300 metres (980 ft) north of St. Peter’s church beside the main road in 2011.

== Sports ==
Berwick RFC is based in Scremerston and fields teams in the Scottish Border League and a number of other Scottish and cross-border leagues. The site includes a clubhouse and gym serving two floodlit pitches. The main pitch and stand sits on the former site of the Borewell Tile Works and clay pit which had been closed since the late 19th century. The club house and second pitch sits on the site of the now defunct Scremerston Workman's Institute, which had previously included a Miners' Welfare Hall, a bandstand used by the Scremerston Colliery Band and a football pitch bordered by an athletics track. A memorial commemorating miners of Scremerston Colliery stands at the entrance to the club.

== Notable people ==
William Ancrum (ca. 1722 – 24 February 1808) was a wealthy American merchant, slave trader and indigo planter from Charleston, South Carolina who was born in Scremerston. Of particular value to historians are the William Ancrum Papers, 1757–1789, which are made up of Ancrum's letters and personal account books, currently held by the South Caroliniana Library at the University of South Carolina. This collection provides insight into the economic impact of the American Revolution on Charleston planters and merchants, from the prices of slaves to restrictions on imports and exports.

Arthur Humble Evans FRSE (23 February 1855 – 28 March 1943) was a British ornithologist. He was born the son of Rev Hugh Evans, the local vicar, in Scremerston. His publications included Birds (illustrated by George Edward Lodge, Cambridge Natural History, 1899), Aves Hawaiienses (1890-1899, with Scott Barchard Wilson), A Vertebrate Fauna of the Shetland Islands (1899, with Thomas Edward Buckley), Handbook to the Natural History of Cambridgeshire (1904), Turner on Birds (1903), A Fauna of the Tweed Area (1911) and The Birds of Britain (1916).

== Climate ==
Climate chart (precipitation, max. and min. temperature)
J	F	M	A	M	J	J	A	S	O	N	D
45 7 2	36 7 2	42 9 3	36 10 4	47 13 7	47 16 9	61 18 11	59 18 11	55 16 9	59 13 7	54 9 4	47 7 2
- █ Average max. and min. temperatures in °C
- █ Precipitation totals in mm
Imperial conversion
J	F	M	A	M	J	J	A	S	O	N	D
1.8 44 35	1.4 45 35	1.7 48 38	1.4 51 40	1.9 56 44	1.9 60 49	2.4 64 53	2.3 64 52	2.1 61 49	2.3 55 44	2.1 49 39	1.9 44 35
- █ Average max. and min. temperatures in °F
- █ Precipitation totals in inches

Scremerston sits in the most northerly part of England on the North Sea coast and has a temperate maritime climate. It tends to have relatively mild summers of around 18 °C (64 °F) and cool but not cold winters, with occasional frosts between October and May. July and August are usually the warmest months, while the coldest months are January, February and December. January has average minimum temperature of 1.7 °C (35.1 °F) and an average of 8 days of frost.

Rainfall is relatively low by English standards, with an average annual rainfall of 589.2 millimetres (23 3/16 in) compared to 854.8 millimetres (33 5/8 in) for England as a whole. Rainfall is spread fairly evenly throughout the year, but highest between July and October. Average sunshine hours are typical for England at 1508.5 hours per year compared to an all England average of 1492.7 hours per year. Scremerston weather data is sourced from the nearest climate station at Berwick-upon-Tweed, located 2.3 miles (3.7 km) from Scremerston and operated by the Met Office.

Climate data for Berwick-upon-Tweed 22 m (72 ft) asl, 1981–2010
Month	Jan	Feb	Mar	Apr	May	Jun	Jul	Aug	Sep	Oct	Nov	Dec	Year
Mean daily maximum °C (°F)	6.8 (44.2)	7.1 (44.8)	8.8 (47.8)	10.4 (50.7)	13.4 (56.1)	15.6 (60.1)	17.9 (64.2)	17.6 (63.7)	16.0 (60.8)	12.8 (55.0)	9.3 (48.7)	6.9 (44.4)	11.9 (53.4)
Daily mean °C (°F)	4.3 (39.7)	4.5 (40.1)	6.0 (42.8)	7.4 (45.3)	10.0 (50.0)	12.5 (54.5)	14.7 (58.5)	14.4 (57.9)	12.7 (54.9)	9.8 (49.6)	6.7 (44.1)	4.4 (39.9)	9.0 (48.1)
Mean daily minimum °C (°F)	1.7 (35.1)	1.8 (35.2)	3.1 (37.6)	4.4 (39.9)	6.6 (43.9)	9.4 (48.9)	11.4 (52.5)	11.2 (52.2)	9.4 (48.9)	6.7 (44.1)	4.1 (39.4)	1.8 (35.2)	6.0 (42.8)
Average rainfall mm (inches)	45.0 (1.77)	35.9 (1.41)	42.1 (1.66)	35.8 (1.41)	47.1 (1.85)	47.3 (1.86)	61.2 (2.41)	59.4 (2.34)	54.5 (2.15)	59.1 (2.33)	54.3 (2.14)	47.4 (1.87)	589.2 (23.20)
Average rainy days	11.1	8.8	10.0	9.8	8.8	8.6	9.7	10.6	9.2	13.4	12.5	11.1	123.6
Mean monthly sunshine hours	59.8	91.8	113.8	159.3	196.3	174.8	182.5	167.3	135.2	103.7	72.9	51.2	1,508.5
Source: Met Office
