= Norham and Islandshires Rural District =

Former local government area in north east England

- Norham and Islandshires highlighted in Northumberland, in 1971
- Area
  - 1911: 47,072 acres (190.5 km^{2})
  - 1961: 47,017 acres (190.3 km^{2})
  - Coordinates: 55.7°N 2.0°W
- Population
  - 1911: 5,830
  - 1961: 3,867
- History
  - Preceded by: Berwick Rural Sanitary District
  - Origin: Local Government Act 1894
  - Created: 1894
  - Abolished: 31 March 1974
  - Succeeded by: Borough of Berwick-upon-Tweed
- Status: Rural district
- Contained within
  - County: Northumberland
  - Police force: Northumberland Constabulary

Norham and Islandshires was a rural district in Northumberland, England from 1894 to 1974.

The district was formed under the Local Government Act 1894 from the Berwick rural sanitary district. It contained all the historic area of Norhamshire and most of Islandshire, including Norham and Lindisfarne (Holy Island), which had been under the jurisdiction of the County Palatine of Durham until 1844.

The district survived until 1974, when it was abolished under the Local Government Act 1972. It then formed part of the Borough of Berwick-upon-Tweed.
