= 1995 Berwick-upon-Tweed Borough Council election =

An election for the Berwick-upon-Tweed Borough Council was held on 4 May 1995. The Liberal Democrats and Independents won twelve seats each, becoming the joint-biggest groups and forcing the council to stay under no overall control. The whole council was up for election, and turnout was 48.5%.

== Election result ==
Berwick-upon-Tweed local election result 1995
| Party | Seats | Gains | Losses | Net gain/loss | Seats % | Votes % | Votes | +/− |
|---|---|---|---|---|---|---|---|---|
| Liberal Democrats | 12 | | | | | 37.2 | | -1.5 |
| Independent | 12 | | | | | 33.5 | | +6.6 |
| Conservative | 2 | | | | | 16.8 | | -6.2 |
| Labour | 2 | | | | | 9.4 | | -2.3 |
| Other Parties | 0 | | | | | 3.1 | | +3.1 |

== See also ==
- Berwick-upon-Tweed Borough Council elections
