= Islandshire =

Historical division of Northumberland, England

- Historic region
- Location in Northumberland
- Coordinates: 55.679°N 1.862°W
- Grid position: NU087428
- Location: Northumberland, England, UK

Islandshire was a 'liberty' north of Northumberland, England, comprising Lindisfarne or Holy Island, plus five parishes on the mainland. Its main settlements were Tweedmouth and Scremerston.

It is historically associated with the Bishop of Durham, and was administratively an exclave of the County Palatinate of Durham. It was transferred to the county of Northumberland by the Counties (Detached Parts) Act 1844, becoming a hundred.

Much of it (minus Tweedmouth) formed part of the Norham and Islandshires Rural District from 1894 until 1974, and then formed part of the borough of Berwick-upon-Tweed district within the County of Northumberland. In 2009 the borough of Berwick-upon-Tweed was abolished as part of wider structural changes to local government in England, with the area now falling under the unitary council of Northumberland County Council. The area, combined with Norham, still forms one of the unitary council's electoral divisions today.

It consisted of the parishes of Ancroft, Belford, Elwick, Holy Island, Kyloe and Tweedmouth.
