= John Crane (comptroller) =

John Crane was a soldier and comptroller of works at Berwick-upon-Tweed during the reigns of Elizabeth I and James VI and I.

== Career ==
Crane was depute-comptroller at Berwick from around 1570, according his own account. In 1591 he contributed to an estimate of repairs needed at Wark on Tweed Castle.

In January 1594 he wrote to Robert Cecil asking for the post of comptroller. He sent an outline of the post's remuneration and argued that a rival, Captain Bowyer, was ineligible for the position as no one should have two offices. Crane was made Comptroller and Clerk of the Check and Musters in February.

With William Ackrigg he surveyed repairs at Wark Castle in April 1594 and noted the ruinous state of Norham Castle and defects in the defences of Berwick. In June he wrote an inventory of the cannon at Berwick and in the border fortresses. Bowyer made recommendations for repairing the timber sections of Berwick Bridge in 1595. Crane, William Selby, and William Akrigg recommended the repair of defensive iron gates on the Tweed bridge.

In 1603, after the death of Elizabeth I, James VI of Scotland became King of England, an event known as the Union of the Crowns. He was determined to unite England and Scotland and gave orders to disband the garrison at Berwick. John Crane, in the interim, was placed in charge of the ordnance on the border.

In January 1604 Crane was acting Governor of Berwick. He wrote to Robert Cecil that despite the downsizing of the garrison the establishment had not been dissolved, and he maintained 20 soldiers and two poor old footmen keeping watch in the watch tower.

In August 1604 Crane accompanied Prince Charles and his guardian Alexander Seton, Lord Fyvie on their journey from Scotland towards London. Crane wrote from Worksop Manor to the Mayor of Leicester, asking him to prepare a lodging with twelve beds and seven hogshead barrels of beer. The Mayor arranged for the royal party, which included the treasurer of Berwick, William Bowes and the master of horse Richard Graham, to stay at the townhouse of William Skipwith. They continued to Dingley, the home of Thomas Griffin and to Easton Neston the home of George Fermor, where James VI and Anne of Denmark joined them.

Crane was paid £100 for the expenses of the Prince's journey as a "clerk of the comptrollments of his Highness' house".

Crane's position at Berwick was abolished and he received a pension from the exchequer. His responsibilities passed to the Captain, William Bowyer. Crane was in debt and asked Robert Cecil to allow him to transfer the pension to someone else.

Crane had sons and daughters who were baptised at Berwick between 1581 and 1592.

== John Crane of Loughton ==
A contemporary John Crane (1576-1660) served King James and Charles I. He was a clerk of the kitchen to King James and was granted a coat of arms in 1606. He became Surveyor General of Navy Victuals in 1635. He married Mary Tresham (died 1624), a daughter of Thomas Tresham of Lyveden. John Tresham was his colleague as clerk of the kitchen. Crane placed monuments to his wife and father at All Saints Church, Loughton.
