= Berwick-upon-Tweed (disambiguation) =

Places known as Berwick-upon-Tweed include:

- the town of Berwick-upon-Tweed, within
- the local government district and borough of Berwick-upon-Tweed, within
- the parliamentary constituency of Berwick-upon-Tweed,

in the county of Northumberland, England.
