= William Bowyer (died 1628) =

English soldier and administrator

William Bowyer (died 1628) was an English soldier, administrator, and Captain of the garrison at Berwick-upon-Tweed.

== Career ==
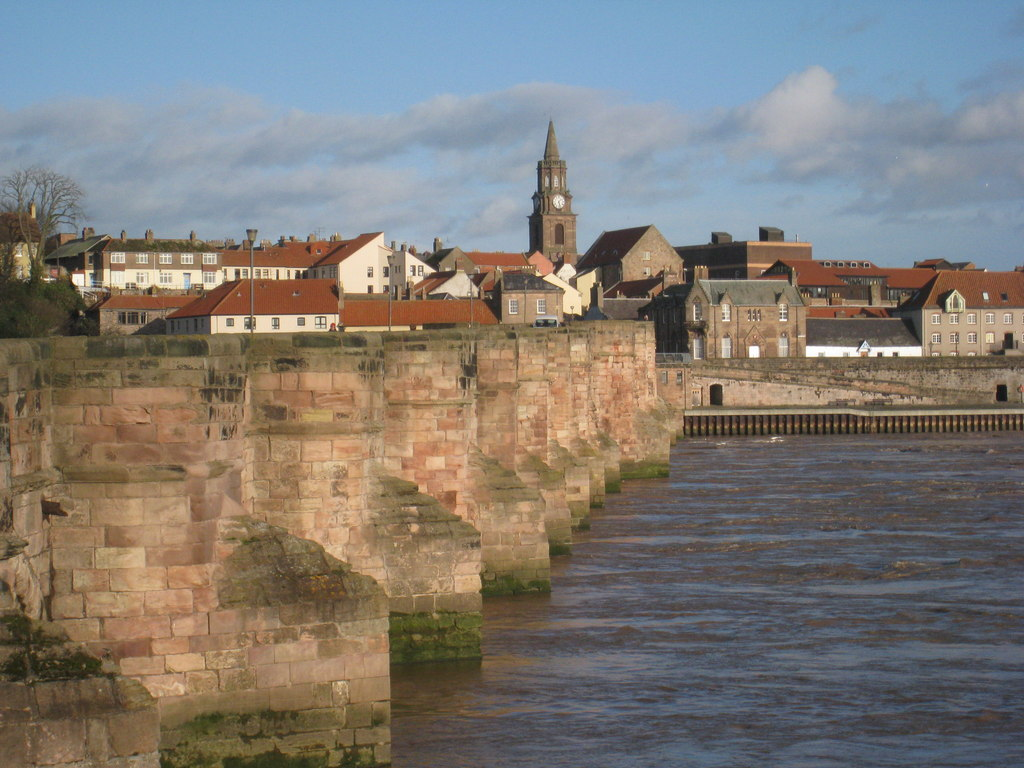
Berwick Bridge

After the Union of the Crowns in 1603, James VI and I scaled down the garrisons on the Anglo-Scottish border. There were to be 100 men at Berwick, and William Bowyer was appointed Captain. He took charge of the remaining artillery from John Crane, the former Comptroller of Berwick. The poet John Taylor described Bowyer as a "worthy old soldier and ancient knight". Bowyer acquired a knighthood, but also continued to be known as "Captain Bowyer", the soldier's rank he had held since July 1593.

He was described as "Master Bowyer" when he was considered for the Comptroller's place in 1594, and John Carey wrote that he was well-travelled and more skilled at fortification works than John Crane. Bowyer was "ready with his pen and knowledge, to make a pound go as far as any". Sir Robert Cecil considered him for Comptroller in 1594, writing to his father William Cecil, 1st Baron Burghley that "Bowier" was "a skillful man in work there", and echoing Carey's assessment that he was more skilled than Crane. However, Crane was preferred by the Lord Chamberlain, Henry Carey, 1st Baron Hunsdon.

Bowyer noted in 1603 that the Berwick garrison was fearful of losing their pay. He made a petition to King James on his own behalf for an income of £20 yearly, as a reward for his services since the Union of the Crowns. He had dealt with rebellious borderers and worked to reduce the costs of the military establishment at Berwick. Bowyer sent John Crane, former Comptroller of Berwick, and William Ourde, Depute Comptroller, to Cecil in February 1604, with his money-saving ideas. He asked that Cecil keep his role secret to maintain his popularity in Berwick.

Bowyer wrote to Lord Cecil in July 1604, requesting that the remaining artillery should not be taken from Berwick in case the deserted fortifications became an encouragement to "turbulent spirits". He wanted to retain at least 15 cannon and the Berwick townspeople requested the use of cannon removed from Wark Castle. In November 1605, Bowyer put Berwick and Holy Island on alert after the Gunpowder Plot, watchful for Thomas Percy who was thought to have fled to Scotland.

Bowyer was involved in planning the rebuilding of Berwick Bridge from 1607. Bowyer's letters reveal a distrust of the previous administration of works at Berwick, which he characterised as "that old shameful thievery". Bowyer regretted the death of the Earl of Dunbar in 1611, a great patron of the town of Berwick, in a letter to the Earl of Salisbury and also mentioned the Scottish architect James Murray as the builder of Dunbar's unfinished house in Berwick. Subsequently, Bowyer was paid for five years as overseer of the bridge works when he was Mayor of Berwick, (between 1620 and 1625).

Bowyer was involved in the transportation of members of the Graham family in July 1606. The Commissioners of the Middle Shires requested the use of 12 armed horsemen from the Berwick garrison. The Grahams were shipped from Workington and Ravenglass to Ireland.

In July 1608, Bowyer visited the silver mine at mine at Hilderstone in West Lothian, which was managed for James VI and I. He discussed the mines with the Earl of Dunbar and met William Godolphin in August. Bowyer was shown a piece of natural silver like a hank of silver wire or thread. Bowyer made efforts to obtain building stone for the Earl of Salisbury from quarries near Berwick.

Bowyer forwarded a letter from the Earl of Salisbury for the Master of Gray at Foulis Castle in October 1608, and made arrangements for letter carrying.

In June 1611, Bowyer and the Mayor of Berwick, Leonard Fairley, interviewed John Bright, master of the Thomas of Lynn. Arbella Stuart and her disguised companions had attempted to charter the Thomas to take them to France. Bright said that one of women wore a black riding safeguard and a black hat, reminding him of Moll Cutpurse.

Bowyer died in November 1628. His wife was Alice Bowyer, and they had a son, George Bowyer. He acted as his father's lieutenant and was sent to the royal court in December 1606, where he reported on artillery at Norham Castle, Wark, and Lindisfarne.
