= Shoreswood =

Civil parish in Northumberland, England

Coordinates: 55.711696°N 2.1000007°W

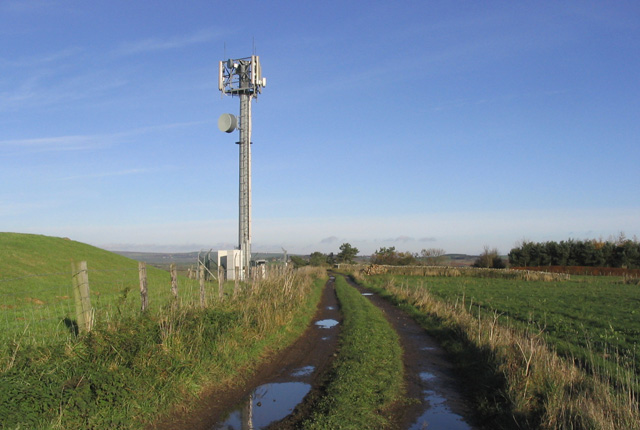

- Location within Northumberland
- Area: 10.45 km^{2} (4.03 sq mi)
- Population: 148 (2011 census)
  - Density: 14/km^{2} (36/sq mi)
- Civil parish: Shoreswood
- Unitary authority: Northumberland
- Ceremonial county: Northumberland
- Region: North East
- Country: England
- Sovereign state: United Kingdom
- Police: Northumbria
- Fire: Northumberland
- Ambulance: North East
- Website: https://northumberlandparishes.uk/shoreswood

Shoreswood is a place and civil parish about 6 miles from Berwick-upon-Tweed, in the county of Northumberland, England. The parish includes the hamlets of Shoresdean and Thornton. In 2011 the parish had a population of 148. The parish touches Ancroft, Duddo, Horncliffe, Norham and Ord.

== Landmarks ==
There are 3 listed buildings in Shoreswood. Shoreswood once had a chapel. Shoreswood Village Hall was built in 1953 but fell into disrepair. Shoreswood National School is shown on the 1st edition Ordnance Survey map of 1866.

=== Deserted villages ===
Shoreswood Hall is the site of the possible deserted medieval village of Shoreswood. The parish contains the deserted medieval village of Edmondhills of which nothing remains and the earthworks of the medieval village of Thorntonpark.

== History ==
The name "Shoreswood" means 'Steep enclosure', the final element was later replaced by 'wood'. Shoreswood was formerly a township in the parish of Norham, in 1866 Shoreswood became a civil parish in its own right. On 1 April 1955 Thornton parish was merged with Shoreswood.
