= Berwick-upon-Tweed Borough Council elections =

Local government elections in Northumberland, England

Berwick-upon-Tweed Borough Council elections were generally held every four years between the council's creation in 1974 and its abolition in 2009. The Borough of Berwick-upon-Tweed was a non-metropolitan district in Northumberland, England. The council was abolished and its functions transferred to Northumberland County Council with effect from 1 April 2009.

== Political control ==
An earlier municipal borough of Berwick-upon-Tweed had existed from 1836 to 1974, just covering the town itself.

Under the Local Government Act 1972 a much larger borough of Berwick-upon-Tweed was created as a non-metropolitan district, including a large rural area as well as the town itself. The first election to the reformed council was held in 1973, initially operating as a shadow authority before coming into its powers on 1 April 1974. From 1974 until its abolition in 2009 political control of the council was as follows:

| Party in control | Years |
|---|---|
| Independent | 1974–1983 |
| No overall control | 1983–1999 |
| Liberal Democrats | 1999–2003 |
| No overall control | 2003–2009 |

== Council elections ==
- 1973 Berwick-upon-Tweed Borough Council election
- 1976 Berwick-upon-Tweed Borough Council election (New ward boundaries)
- 1979 Berwick-upon-Tweed Borough Council election
- 1983 Berwick-upon-Tweed Borough Council election
- 1987 Berwick-upon-Tweed Borough Council election
- 1991 Berwick-upon-Tweed Borough Council election
- 1995 Berwick-upon-Tweed Borough Council election
- 1999 Berwick-upon-Tweed Borough Council election (New ward boundaries)
- 2003 Berwick-upon-Tweed Borough Council election
- 2007 Berwick-upon-Tweed Borough Council election

== Results maps ==
2003 results map

2007 results map

== Mayoral referendum ==
A referendum was held on 21 February 2002 on whether to have a directly elected mayor. The proposal was decisively rejected.

Support 3,617 26%

Oppose 10,212 74%

Turnout 64%

== By-election results ==
=== 1995-1999 ===
Seton By-Election 19 February 1998
| Party | Candidate | Votes | % | ±% |
|---|---|---|---|---|
| Liberal Democrats | | 340 | 57.9 | |
| Labour | | 154 | 26.2 | |
| Conservative | | 93 | 15.8 | |
| Majority | | 186 | 31.7 | |
| Turnout | | 587 | 39.6 | |
| Liberal Democrats gain from Labour | | Swing | | |

=== 1999-2003 ===
Bamburgh By-Election 6 July 2000
| Party | Candidate | Votes | % | ±% |
|---|---|---|---|---|
| Conservative | | 278 | 73.5 | |
| Liberal Democrats | | 100 | 26.5 | |
| Majority | | 178 | 47.0 | |
| Turnout | | 378 | 52.3 | |
| Conservative gain from Independent | | Swing | | |

North Sunderland By-Election 6 July 2000
| Party | Candidate | Votes | % | ±% |
|---|---|---|---|---|
| Conservative | | 337 | 44.5 | +44.5 |
| Independent | | 319 | 42.1 | −9.2 |
| Liberal Democrats | | 102 | 13.5 | +13.5 |
| Majority | | 18 | 2.4 | |
| Turnout | | 758 | 49.3 | |
| Conservative gain from Independent | | Swing | | |

Spittal By-Election 15 November 2001
| Party | Candidate | Votes | % | ±% |
|---|---|---|---|---|
| Liberal Democrats | | 332 | 51.6 | −2.9 |
| Independent | | 203 | 31.6 | −2.3 |
| Conservative | | 65 | 10.1 | +10.1 |
| Labour | | 43 | 6.7 | −4.9 |
| Majority | | 129 | 20.0 | |
| Turnout | | 643 | 26.9 | |
| Liberal Democrats hold | | Swing | | |

=== 2003-2007 ===
Belford By-Election 1 April 2004
| Party | Candidate | Votes | % | ±% |
|---|---|---|---|---|
| Conservative | | 196 | 53.7 | +32.7 |
| Independent | | 169 | 46.3 | +12.2 |
| Majority | | 27 | 7.4 | |
| Turnout | | 365 | 41.0 | |
| Conservative gain from Liberal Democrats | | Swing | | |

Shielfield By-Election 16 December 2004
| Party | Candidate | Votes | % | ±% |
|---|---|---|---|---|
| Conservative | Karen Thorburn | 111 | 52.6 | +52.6 |
| Liberal Democrats | Douglas Hunter | 100 | 47.4 | +47.4 |
| Majority | | 11 | 5.2 | |
| Turnout | | 211 | 31.3 | |
| Conservative gain from Independent | | Swing | | |

Spittal By-Election 16 December 2004
| Party | Candidate | Votes | % | ±% |
|---|---|---|---|---|
| Independent | David Stewart | 206 | 61.7 | +61.7 |
| Liberal Democrats | Thomas Wakenshaw | 128 | 38.3 | +38.3 |
| Majority | | 78 | 23.4 | |
| Turnout | | 334 | 15.0 | |
| Independent gain from Liberal Democrats | | Swing | | |
