= Scremerston railway station =

Disused railway station in Northumberland, England

Scremerston
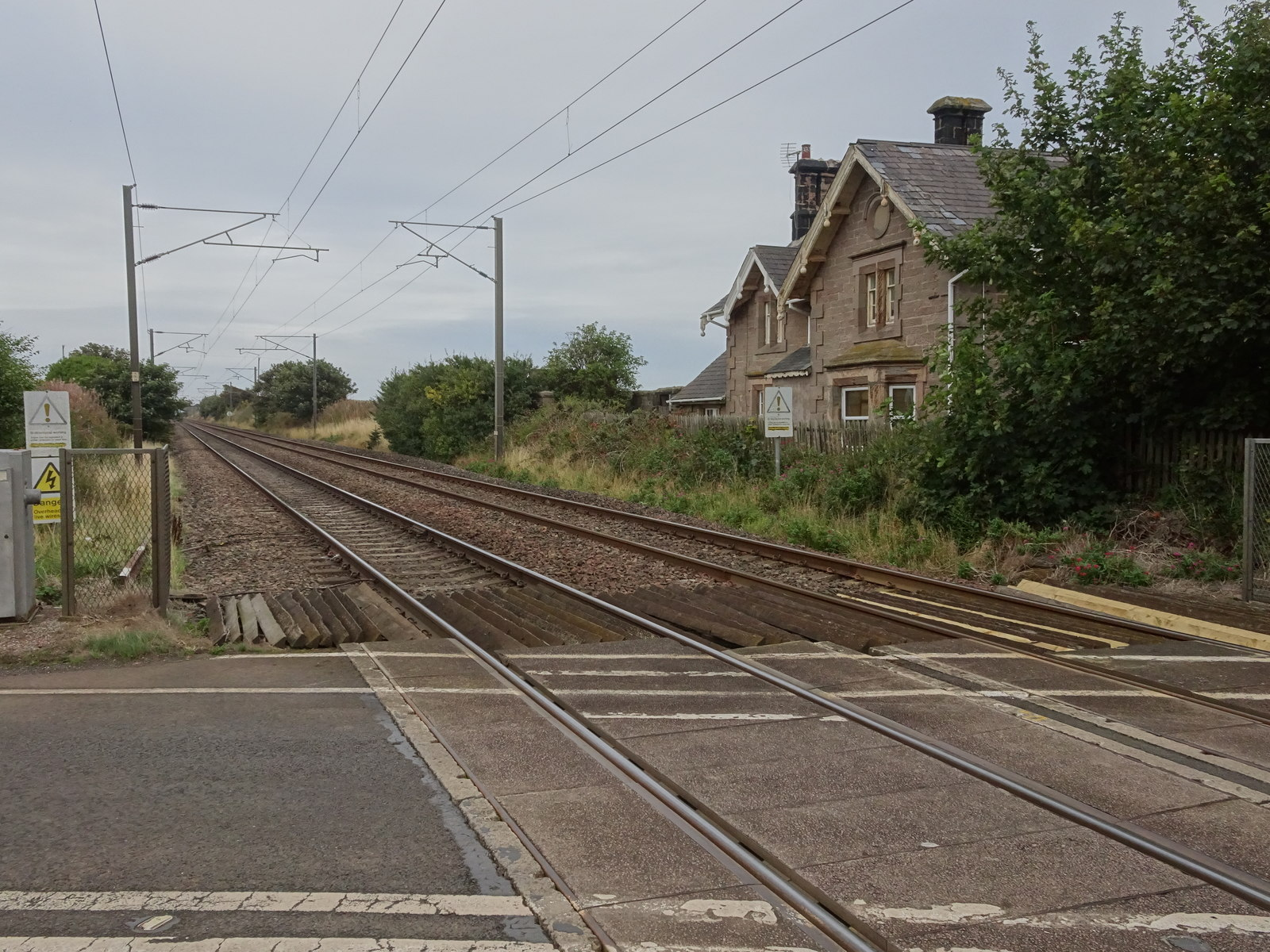
- The site of the station, looking northwest towards Tweedmouth, in 2018

General information
- Location: Scremerston, Northumberland; England
- Coordinates: 55.738218°N 1.969124°W
- Grid reference: NU02034942
- Platforms: 2

Other information
- Status: Disused

History
- Original company: York, Newcastle and Berwick Railway
- Pre-grouping: NER
- Post-grouping: LNER; British Railways (North Eastern)

Key dates
- 29 March 1847: Opened
- 5 May 1941: Temporarily closed to passengers
- 7 October 1946: Reopened
- 8 July 1951: Closed to passengers again
- 9 July 1951: Closed completely
Location

Scremerston railway station served the village of Scremerston, Northumberland, England from 1847 to 1951 on the East Coast Main Line.

== History ==
The station opened on 29 March 1847 by the York, Newcastle and Berwick Railway. The station was situated at a level crossing of an unnamed minor road a mile east from Scremerston village. This was one of the original Newcastle and Berwick stations and it was designed by the Newcastle architect Benjamin Green. South of the level crossing was a siding that served a lime depot. The passenger traffic at most of the main line stations in the north of Northumberland was so light that the LNER closed most of them; Scremerston was one of them, closing on 5 May 1941. The station later reopened on 7 October 1946, although Sunday services were stopped. In 1950, a memorandum was made that showed that closure would yield an annual net economy of £559 so it was recommended that the station should close to all traffic. The station closed to passengers again on 8 July 1951 and closed completely the day after, although an unadvertised service ran in 1953. The platforms were demolished in 1959. The lime depot still exists and the station house is in residential use.

| Preceding station | Historical railways | Following station |
|---|---|---|
| Goswick; Line open, station closed | York, Newcastle and Berwick Railway; East Coast Main Line | Tweedmouth; Line open, station closed |
