= Arthur Humble Evans =

British ornithologist (1855–1943)

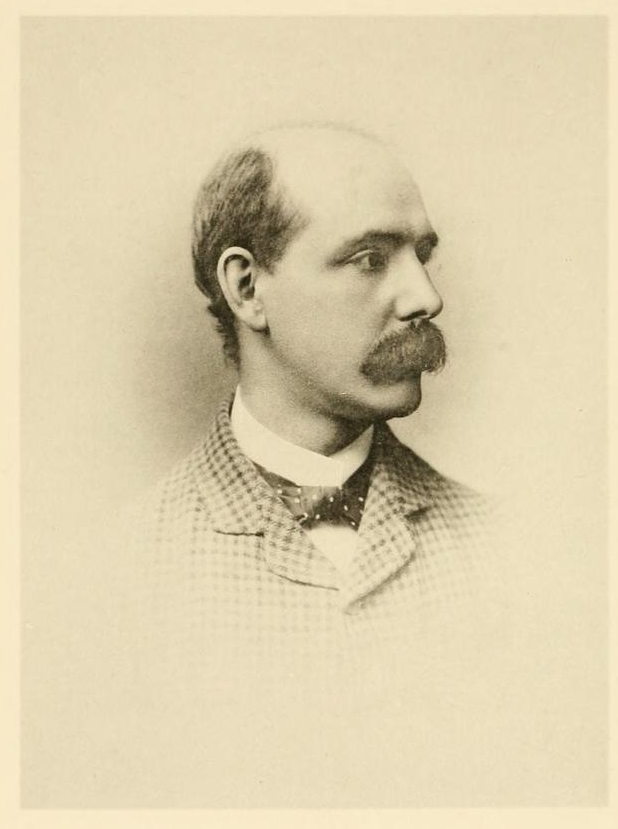
Photographed c. 1908

Arthur Humble Evans FRSE (23 February 1855 – 28 March 1943) was a British ornithologist.

== Life ==
He was born in Scremerston on the Northumberland coast on 23 February 1855, the son of Rev Hugh Evans, the local vicar. He attended school in Durham and here befriended Henry Baker Tristram who instilled in him his first love of ornithology.

He graduated MA from Clare College, Cambridge in 1879 in the Second Class of the Classic Tripos later also gaining a doctorate (DSc). He became a lecturer in English History and Economics at Cambridge University, living at 9 Harvey Road in Cambridge. In 1900 he was elected as an Esquire Bedell.

From 1901 to 1912 he was joint editor of The Ibis magazine with Dr Philip Sclater.

He made a study trip of South Africa in 1905 and Australia in 1914.

In 1924 he was elected a Fellow of the Royal Society of Edinburgh. His proposers were Sir Hugh Steuart Gladstone, George Muirhead, James Ritchie and William Eagle Clarke.

He retired to Cheviot House in Crowthorne in Buckinghamshire in 1928 and died there on 28 March 1943.

== Publications ==
- Birds, illustrated by George Edward Lodge, Cambridge Natural History (1899)
- Aves Hawaiienses (1890–1899), with Scott Barchard Wilson
- A Vertebrate Fauna of the Shetland Islands (1899), with Thomas Edward Buckley
- Handbook to the Natural History of Cambridgeshire (1904)
- Turner on Birds (1903)
- A Fauna of the Tweed Area (1911)
- The Birds of Britain (1916)
