= Easington, Northumberland =

Former civil parish in Northumberland, England

Coordinates: 55.606505°N 1.8097132°W

Easington
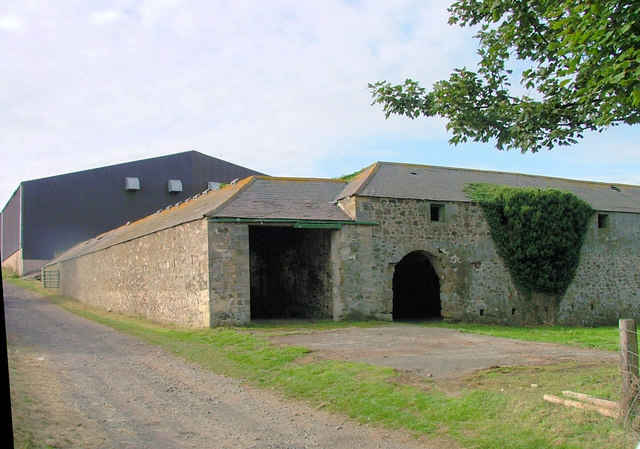

- Location within Northumberland
- Area: 11.3 km^{2} (4.4 sq mi)
- Population: 143 (2011 census)
  - Density: 13/km^{2} (34/sq mi)
- Civil parish: Belford
- Unitary authority: Northumberland
- Ceremonial county: Northumberland
- Region: North East
- Country: England
- Sovereign state: United Kingdom
- Police: Northumbria
- Fire: Northumberland
- Ambulance: North East

Easington is a place and former civil parish, now in the parish of Belford about 14 miles from Alnwick, in the county of Northumberland, England. In 2011 the parish had a population of 143. The parish touched Adderstone with Lucker, Bamburgh, Belford and Middleton. The parish is coastal and stretches from Budle Bay in the east to Chesters Hill.

== Features ==
There are 9 listed buildings in Easington.

== History ==
The name 'Easington' means "Farm/settlement at or called Yesing", Yesing meaning "the gushing one", a stream-name. Easington is a deserted medieval village; the village existed in 1296 but by the 18th century it was only 2 farms. Easington was formerly a township in the parish of Belford; in 1866 Easington became a civil parish in its own right. On 1 April 1955 Easington Grange, Outchester and Spindlestone parishes were merged with Easington.

The parish council was one of several in Northumberland that had been dormant for many years. In February 2020 it was decided to abolish the parish of Easington and transfer the land into that of Belford; on 1 April 2021 the parish was abolished.
