= Berwick Bridge =

Road bridge in Northumberland, England

- Coordinates: 55.7680°N 2.008°W
- OS grid reference: NT995527
- Crosses: River Tweed
- Locale: Northumberland
- Heritage status: Grade I listed
- Preceded by: Royal Tweed Bridge

Characteristics
- Material: Tweedmouth Red Sandstone
- Total length: 1,164 ft (355 m)
- Width: 17 ft (5.2 m)
- No. of spans: 15
- Load limit: 7.5 t
- No. of lanes: Single-track road; southbound only

History
- Construction start: 19 June 1611
- Construction cost: £16,750
- Opened: 1624
- Replaced by: Royal Tweed Bridge; as route of A1

Location
- Interactive map of Berwick Bridge

Berwick Bridge, also known as the Old Bridge, spans the River Tweed in Berwick-upon-Tweed, Northumberland, England. The current structure is a Grade I listed stone bridge built between 1611 and 1624.

== History ==
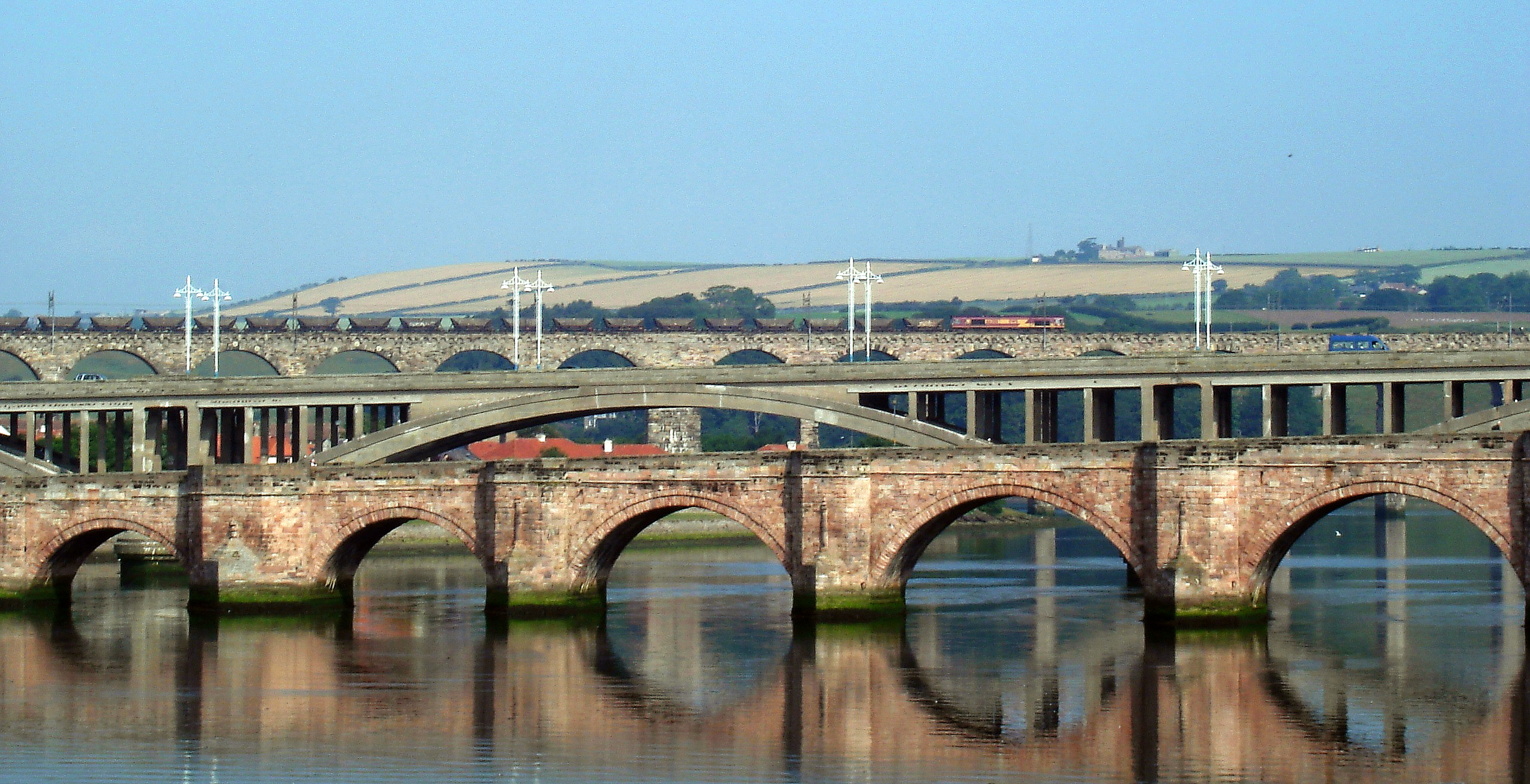
The three bridges in Berwick

Prior to the construction of the stone bridge, the crossing was served by a series of wooden bridges. which were variously destroyed by flooding and military action. James Burrell became Surveyor of Works of the town in 1604, making him responsible for maintenance of the bridge. He was previously also occupied on the fortifications around Berwick before James VI and I ascended the throne of England, rendering them redundant.

Burrell was directed by Sir William Bowyer to make estimates for repairing the bridge in June 1607, after damage attributed to an underwater earthquake. Bowyer involved two Aldermen of Berwick and wrote to Robert Cecil, 1st Earl of Salisbury of his distrust of Burrell, because of the historic corruption and abuse in the military works. Burrell noted that the 140 yard long timber portion of the existing bridge, which was 30 years old, should be rebuilt. New timber could come from Chopwell Woods. Stone from an old pier and tower could be reused. Burrell thought there was "no surety of long safety" for the structure.

In 1608, ten piers of the wooden bridge were destroyed by ice, and Burrell wrote to Robert Cecil, then Secretary of State, to recommend the construction of a stone bridge. Arrangements were made in May 1608 to collect funds, and a royal warrant of November 1608 granted £10,000 (equivalent to £2,200,000 in 2025) from arrears of royal rents, but only £3,300 had been collected by 1611. The Captain of Berwick, Sir William Bowyer, was unsatisfied with this progress, and a proposal was made for a bridge with seven stone arches over the deepest part of the river and the rest built of wood. After further collapse of the old wooden bridge, a modified proposal, for an entirely stone bridge with 13 arches, and estimated to cost a further £8,462, was put to the Privy Council, and on 16 May 1611 the King ordered £8,000 to be put towards the bridge. Work started on the bridge on 19 June that year, and by September 170 men were employed on its construction. At some point it was decided to build it with 15 arches instead.

In 1618, a further £4,000 grant was given, but this money had been used by 1620 and the Privy Council placed the bridge project under the supervision of the Bishop of Durham Richard Neile before any more money was given. Neile contracted Burrell and the leading mason Lancelot Bramston to finish the bridge at a cost of £1,750, and installed John Johnson of Newcastle as supervisor. The bridge was completed by September 1621 except for the parapets and paving, but a flood in October 1621 swept away some masonry and the wooden centring. In light of the accident, a grant of £3,000 was made and work restarted the following March, and the bridge was opened to traffic in 1624, although minor work continued for the next decade.

The bridge became less important for road traffic as the main route moved westwards, first to the concrete Royal Tweed Bridge built in the 1920s, and then in the 1980s a bypass took the A1 road out of Berwick altogether.

It is a Grade I listed building and a scheduled monument.

== Design ==
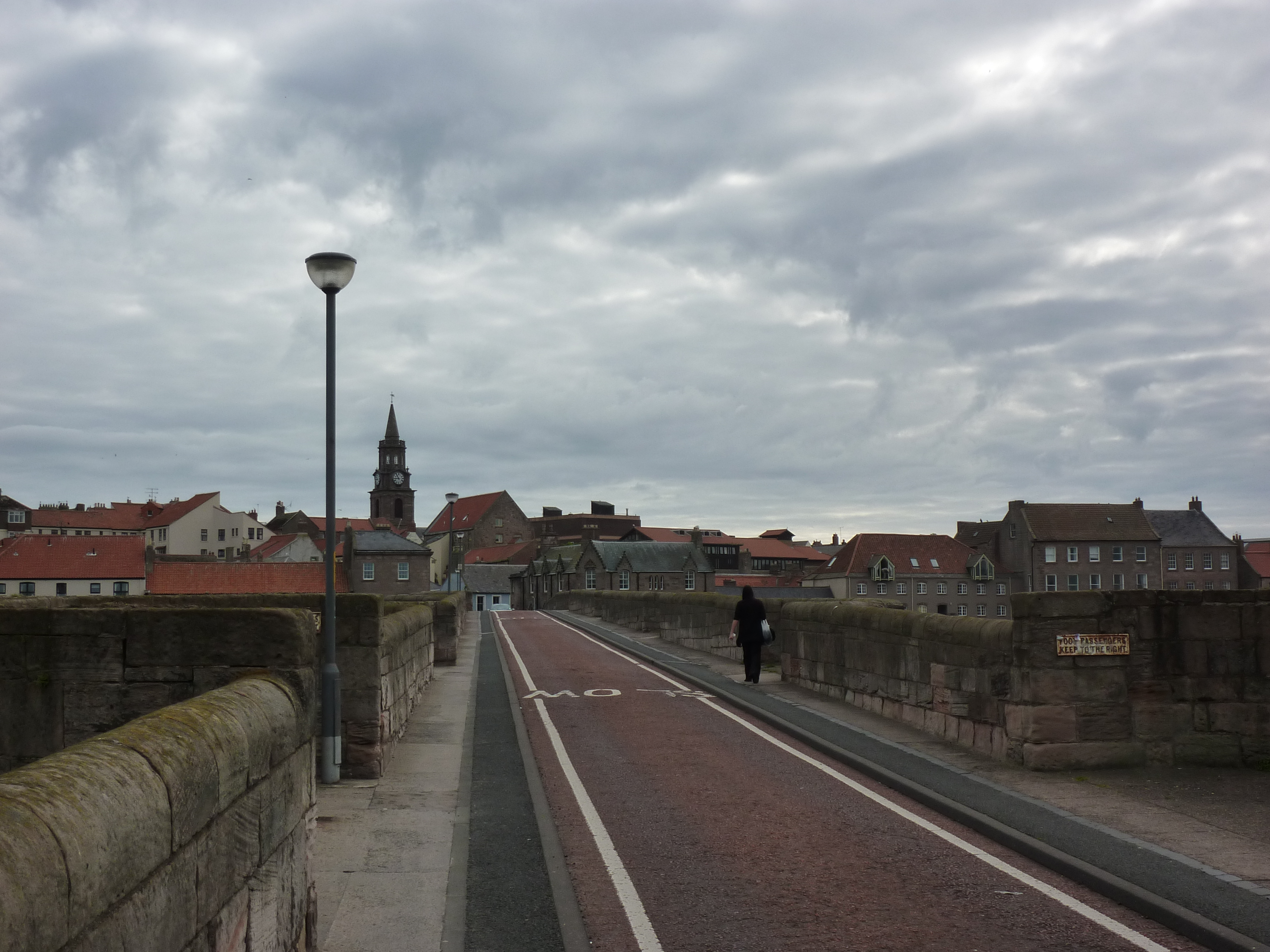
View from the roadway

The bridge is 1,164 ft (355 m) long and 17 ft (5.2 m) wide between the parapets, with an upwards slope towards the north-eastern end. The spans are not even in length, and range between 24 ft (7.3 m) and 75 ft (23 m), the longest being the penultimate span at the north-eastern end.

It is built from sandstone quarried at Tweedmouth. The piers are founded on large oak piles from 873 trees, mainly taken from Chopwell Forest.

The triangular cutwaters extend up to the level of the deck to become pedestrian refuges.

The bridge is now one way, from east to west. A short distance upstream is the Royal Tweed Bridge, which succeeded the Berwick Bridge as the main road crossing of the Tweed at Berwick when it opened in 1928. In 1984, the A1 River Tweed Bridge opened about a mile to the west of Berwick, carrying the A1 road around the town.
