= Royal Tweed Bridge =

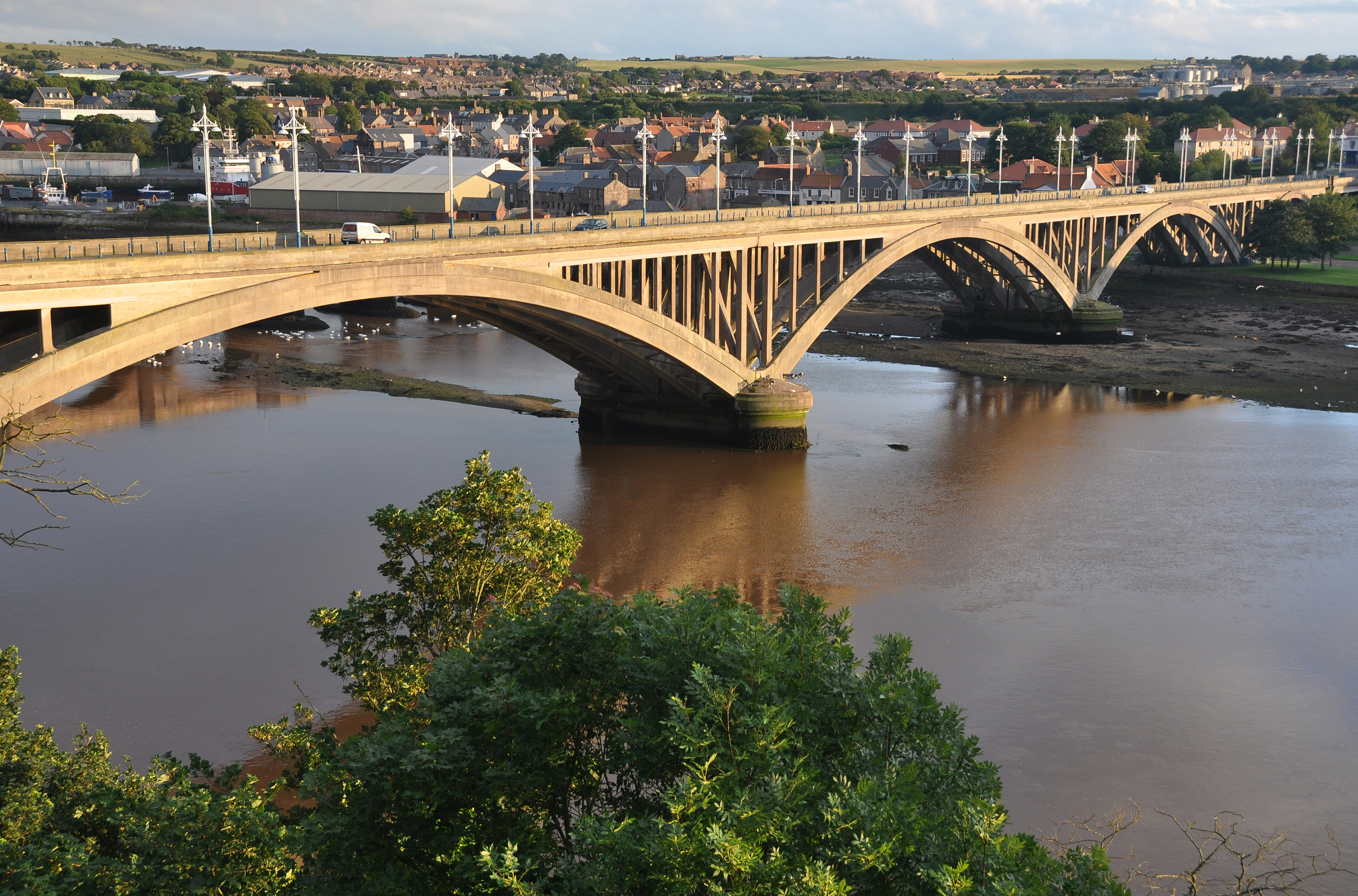
- Royal Tweed Bridge
- Coordinates: 55.7687°N 2.0085°W
- OS grid reference: NT995528
- Carries: A1167 road
- Crosses: River Tweed
- Locale: Northumberland
- Heritage status: Grade II* listed
- Preceded by: Royal Border Bridge
- Followed by: Berwick Bridge

Characteristics
- Design: Arch bridge
- Material: Reinforced concrete
- Total length: 430 m (1,410 ft)
- Longest span: 108.5 m (356 ft)
- No. of spans: 4
- Piers in water: 2
- No. of lanes: 2

History
- Designer: L. G. Mouchel & Partners
- Engineering design by: Charles Bressey; J. H. Bean
- Constructed by: Holloway Brothers
- Construction start: 1925
- Construction end: 1928
- Construction cost: £180,000
- Opened: 1928
- Inaugurated: 16 May 1928; by Edward, Prince of Wales
- Replaced by: A1 River Tweed Bridge; as route of A1

The Royal Tweed Bridge, also known as the New Bridge locally, is a road bridge in Berwick-upon-Tweed, Northumberland, England crossing the River Tweed. It was intended to divert traffic from the 17th century Berwick Bridge, and until the 1980s it formed part of the A1 road, the main route from London to Edinburgh. However, the construction of the A1 River Tweed Bridge to the west of Berwick has since reduced the Royal Tweed Bridge's importance.

== History ==
It was designed by L.G. Mouchel & Partners, with consulting engineers Charles Bressey and J. H. Bean, and the contractors for construction were Holloway Brothers of London.

Construction took place between 1925 and 1928. The total cost of the bridge was £180,000 (equivalent to £12,600,000 in 2023), and up to 170 workers were employed during its construction. It was opened by the then Prince of Wales, later Edward VIII, on 16 May 1928.

It was built to supplement the older Berwick Bridge a short distance downstream, which still carries road traffic. A bridge had first been proposed in 1896, and a scheme was produced in 1914, but the outbreak of the First World War meant that plans were put on hold until 1924. A seven-arched stone bridge was proposed at this time, but eventually the concrete design was decided upon.

The bridge was repaired in 1980, as it had been damaged by de-icing salt and its proximity to the sea. The A1 River Tweed Bridge, which opened in 1984, now carries the A1 road about a mile to the west of the Royal Tweed Bridge, reducing its importance as a crossing of the Tweed.

It is a Grade II* listed building in recognition of its innovative design and striking scale.

== Design ==
The bridge is built from reinforced concrete and consists of four unequal arches, with approach viaducts at each end. The northern end of the bridge is higher, and towards that end the spans are longer.

The spans are of lengths 50.1 m (164 ft), 74.4 m (244 ft), 95.5 m (313 ft) and 108.5 m (356 ft), and the approach viaducts are 60 m (200 ft) and 44 m (144 ft) long. The spans consist of four arched ribs, solid in the case of the shortest span and hollow for the longer spans. Columns rise from the ribs and are connected at the top by longitudinal beams, which support perpendicular beams that carry the roadway. The piers and abutments are constructed from mass concrete, and there are expansion joints and a system of wind braces over each of the piers.

The parapets are made of dressed sandstone, and there are cast iron lamposts on either side of the roadway.

At the time of its construction, it held the record for the longest single concrete span in the UK.
