= Tweedmouth =

Village in Northumberland, England

Coordinates: 55.761°N 2.010°W

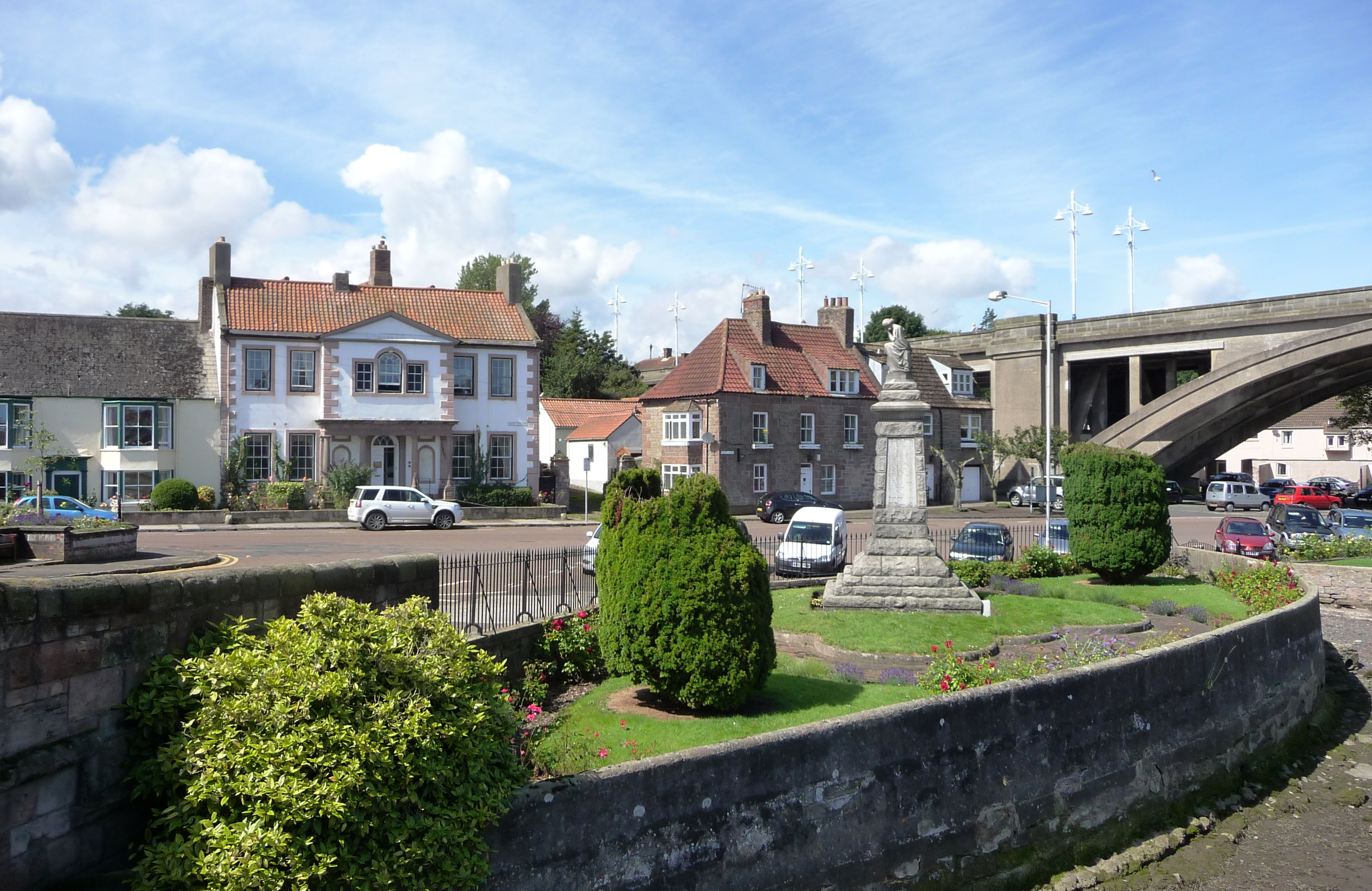
- Tweedmouth West End

- Location within Northumberland
- OS grid reference: NT995525
  - London: 345 miles (555 km)
- Civil parish: Berwick-upon-Tweed
- Unitary authority: Northumberland
- Ceremonial county: Northumberland
- Region: North East
- Country: England
- Sovereign state: United Kingdom
- Post town: Berwick-upon-Tweed
- Postcode district: TD15
- Dialling code: 01289
- Police: Northumbria
- Fire: Northumberland
- Ambulance: North East
- UK Parliament: North Northumberland
- Website: Berwick-upon-Tweed Town Council

Tweedmouth is part of the town of Berwick-upon-Tweed, in Northumberland, England. It is located on the south bank of the River Tweed and is connected to Berwick town centre, on the north bank, by two road bridges and a railway bridge. Tweedmouth has historically always been part of England, in contrast to the walled town of Berwick which came under Scottish control for several periods in the Middle Ages. The local nickname for people from Tweedmouth is "Twempies".

== Governance ==
Tweedmouth is part of Berwick-upon-Tweed Town Council, which also includes neighbouring Spittal. It is in the parliamentary constituency of North Northumberland. The unitary authority for the area is Northumberland County Council. It was historically part of Islandshire, which was an exclave of County Durham, before becoming a hundred of Northumberland in 1844. In 1951 the parish had a population of 6,410. On 1 April 1974, the parish was abolished and became part of Berwick upon Tweed unparished area which became parished in 2008.

== Attractions ==
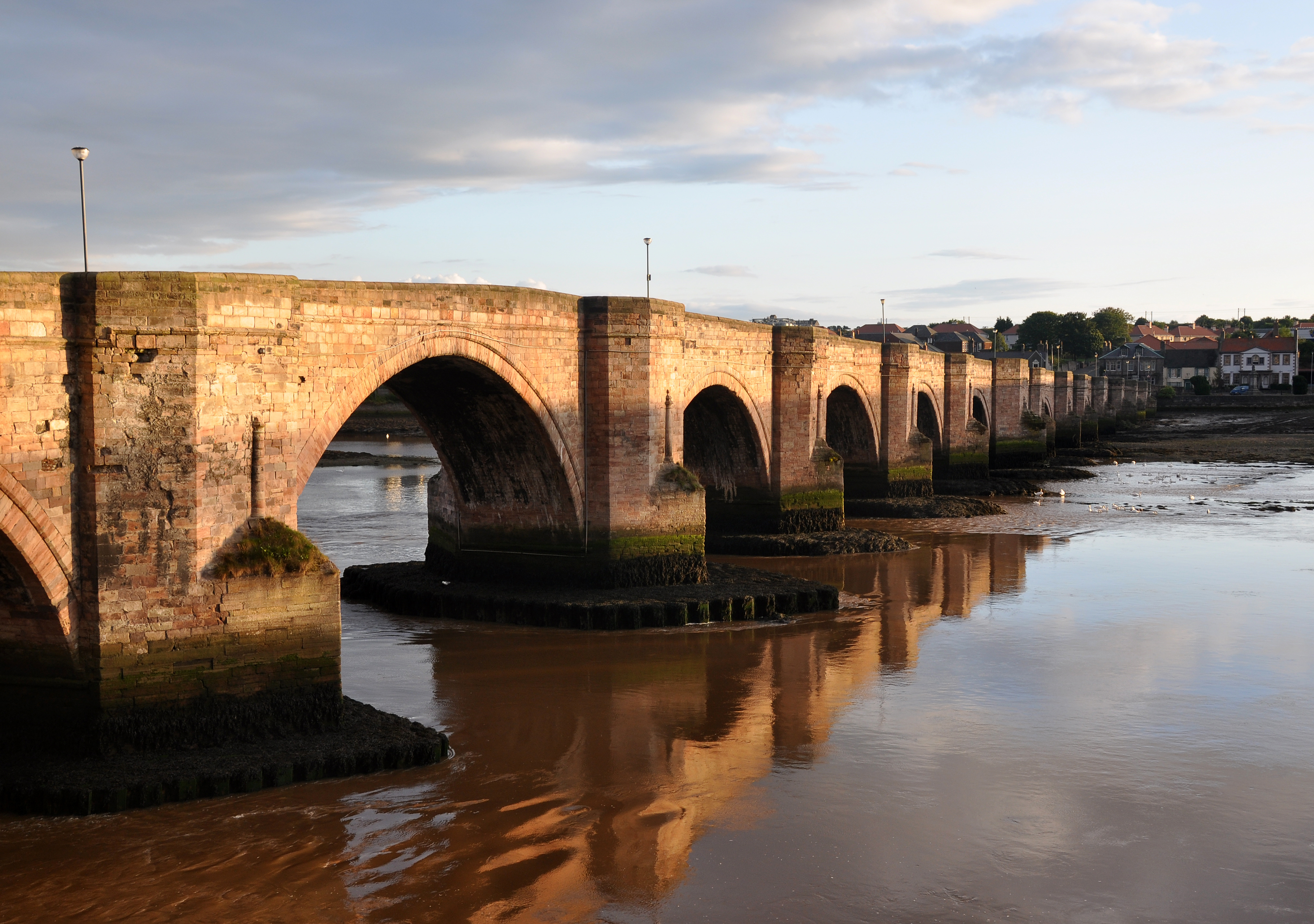
The Old Bridge

In an annual ceremony dating back to 1292, Tweedmouth schools elect a Salmon Queen to mark the start of Salmon Week, a traditional celebration which dates to medieval times. The event is a reminder that Tweedmouth has a long history of salmon fishing on the river. There is a procession from Berwick town hall across the Old Bridge to Tweedmouth where the incoming Salmon Queen is crowned.

The parish church of St Bartholomew and St Boisil dates to the late 18th century. It stands on the site of an earlier church built in 1145, which was in turn on the site of an earlier 7th century church. The church's weather-vane is in the form of a salmon.

The most obvious historic landmark is the 15-arched Old Bridge, built of local sandstone in 1610. The bridge was built by order of James VI and I, and formed part of the Great North Road between London and Edinburgh. The Old Bridge still carries traffic across the River Tweed. The Royal Tweed Bridge and Royal Border Railway Bridge also span the river at Tweedmouth, the latter being opened by Queen Victoria in 1850.

== The Tweed Dock ==
The Tweed Dock officially opened in October 1876, replacing the older port on the north bank of the river which had become inadequate. Following improvement works in 1993 vessels with a maximum beam of 16 metres are now able to enter the dock. Due to its geographical location the port primarily handles cargoes linked to the agricultural industry, with fertilisers, malting barley, feed barley and oilseed rape the principal commodities.

== Sport and recreation ==
Berwick Rangers football club plays at Shielfield Park in Tweedmouth. The stadium also hosts motorcycle speedway, in the form of Berwick Bandits. The neighbouring ground of Old Shielfield Park is home to Tweedmouth Rangers F.C., who play in the East of Scotland Football League. The Swan Leisure Centre is a multi-purpose leisure facility with a swimming pool, gym, sports hall and all-weather outdoor pitch.

== Photographs of Tweedmouth ==
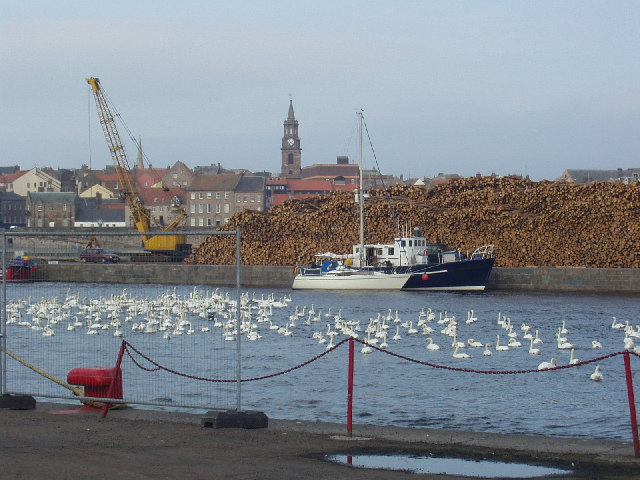
The Tweed Dock

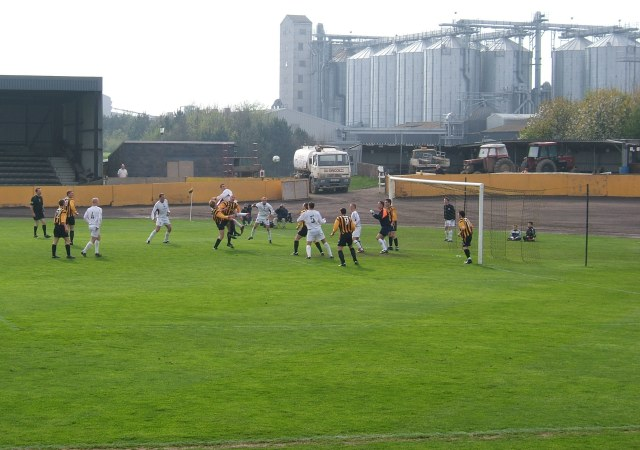
Shielfield Park

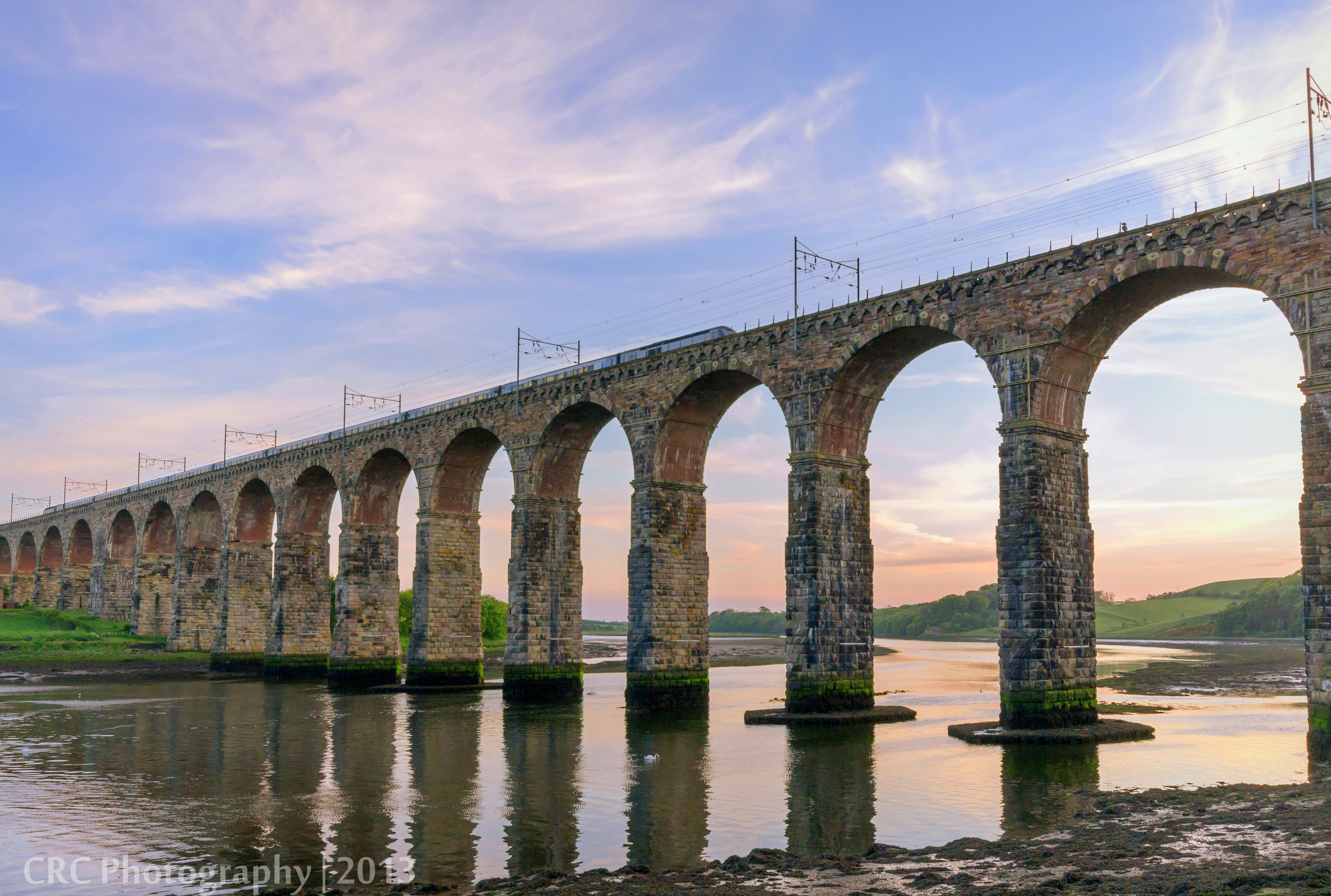
Royal Border Bridge

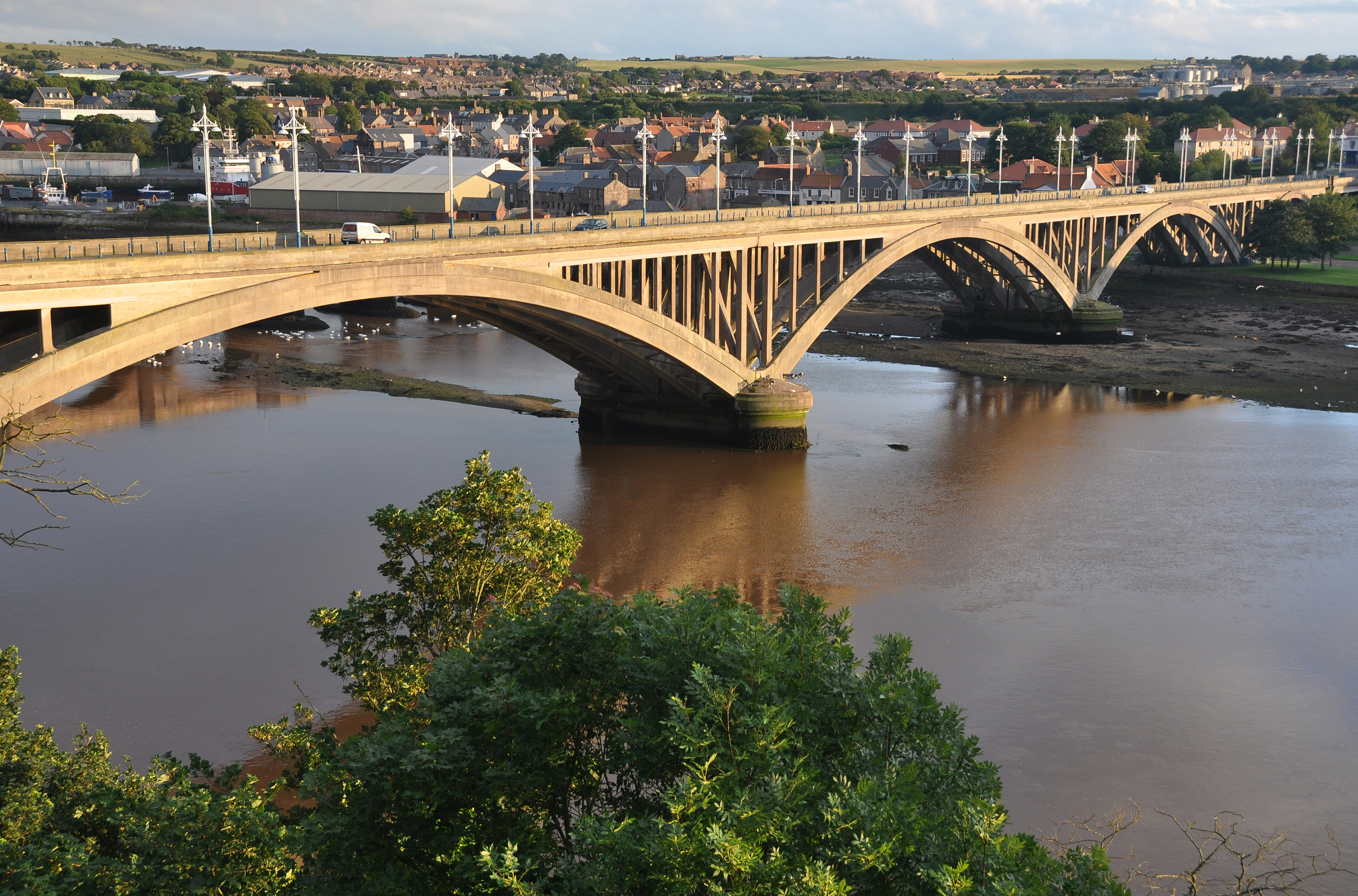
Royal Tweed Bridge

== See also ==
- Tweedmouth railway station
- Baron Tweedmouth
