= Ancroft =

Village in Northumberland, England

Coordinates: 55.69°N 02.00°W

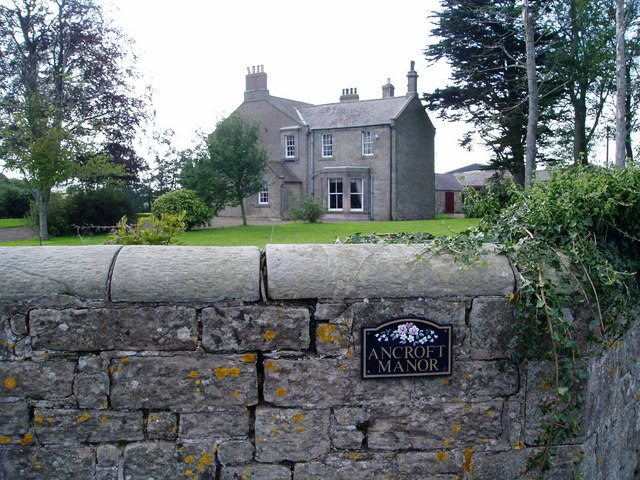
- Ancroft Manor

- Location within Northumberland
- Population: 895 (2011 census)
- OS grid reference: NU0045
- Unitary authority: Northumberland
- Ceremonial county: Northumberland
- Region: North East
- Country: England
- Sovereign state: United Kingdom
- Post town: BERWICK-UPON-TWEED
- Postcode district: TD15
- Dialling code: 01289
- Police: Northumbria
- Fire: Northumberland
- Ambulance: North East
- UK Parliament: North Northumberland

Ancroft is a village and civil parish (which includes the village of Scremerston) in Northumberland, England. Prior to 1844, Ancroft lay within the Islandshire exclave of County Durham. It is south of Berwick-upon-Tweed, and has a population of 885, rising slightly to 895 at the 2011 census.

There are several suggestions as to how Ancroft got its name. It might be an abridged version of "Aidan's-croft" – the croft of St Aidan who was the first Bishop of Lindisfarne (Holy Island). Alternatively, it might be that as the church is dedicated to Saint Anne, the village took its name from the church – "St Anne's croft". A third suggestion is simply that it means one croft or solitary croft – "ane croft".

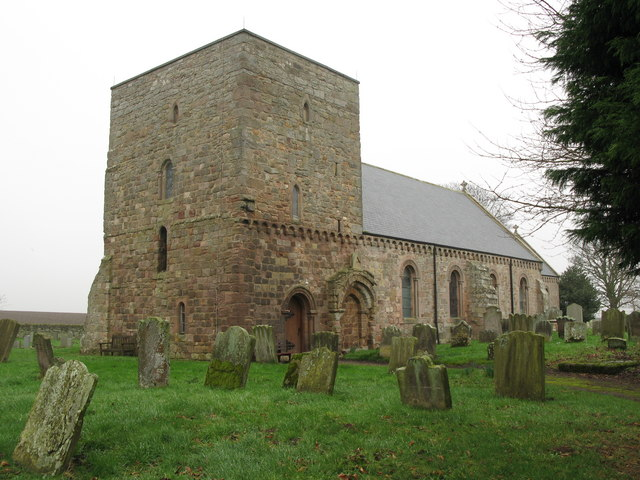
St Anne's Church, Ancroft

There was surely more than one croft here when the church was built, probably towards the end of the 11th century; but in common with most of this region, the community declined in the latter part of the 13th century because of the continual border raids by the Scots. This turbulent history is reflected in the number of castles and peel towers in the vicinity, besides the fortified tower that was added to the church in the thirteenth century.

Because of the repeated incursions by Scots, this northern part of what we now call Northumberland was placed in the charge of the prince-bishops of Durham. They were powerful and wealthy men who had the resources to defend the border. That is why this area was still part of County Durham until the mid 1800s.

After the accession of James I (James VI of Scotland) to the throne of England in 1603 there seems to have been a return of people to the village. But in 1667 the plague struck Ancroft, The victims were carried out into the fields where they were covered with shelters made from branches of broom. After death both bodies and shelters were burned in a rudimentary and fruitless attempt to control the spread of the disease. To this day a field to the south of the village is called "Broomie Huts". In desperation the authorities of the day ordered that the plague-affected cottages should be burned to the ground. The mounds where the cottages stood, and the former village street, can still be seen in the field between the main road and the burn.

By the time of Queen Anne (1702–1714) the village was flourishing once more, with a population of over one thousand. The main industry, other than farming, was shoe and clog making. Sailors of the Royal Navy wore shoes or slippers from Ancroft. The naval specification required footwear with no metal parts – an obvious precaution to avoid sparks in a wooden ship loaded with gunpowder and tarred rope! Boots were also made for the British army – the Duke of Marlborough's troops marched to victory shod in Ancroft boots. A village tradition claims that each of the one hundred trees on the southern skyline represents a cobbler.

Several of the local settlements originated around coal mines, an industry which is being redeveloped in today's open cast sites.

== Landmarks ==
The Devil's Causeway passes the village less than 1 mile (2 km) to the east. The causeway is a Roman road which starts at Port Gate on Hadrian's Wall, north of Corbridge, and extends 55 miles (89 km) northwards across Northumberland to the mouth of the River Tweed at Berwick-upon-Tweed.
