= Horncliffe =

Village in Northumberland, England

Coordinates: 55.739°N 2.121°W

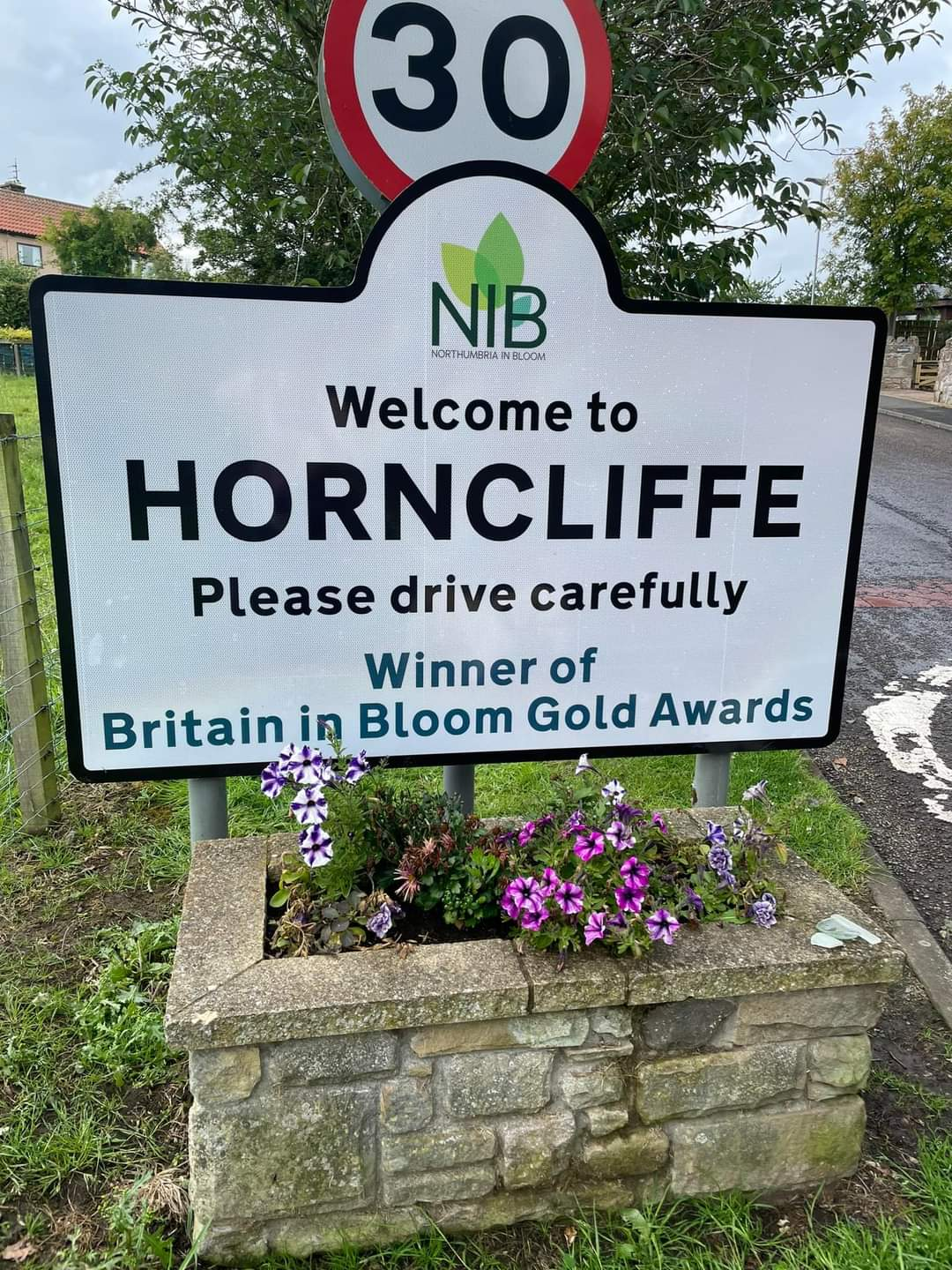
- Horncliffe

- Location within Northumberland
- Population: 403 (2011 census)
- OS grid reference: NT925495
- Unitary authority: Northumberland
- Ceremonial county: Northumberland
- Region: North East
- Country: England
- Sovereign state: United Kingdom
- Post town: BERWICK UPON TWEED
- Postcode district: TD15
- Police: Northumbria
- Fire: Northumberland
- Ambulance: North East
- UK Parliament: North Northumberland

Horncliffe is a village in the county of Northumberland, England. It lies on the south bank of the River Tweed about 5 miles (8 km) southwest of Berwick-upon-Tweed, and about 3 miles (5 km) northeast of Norham and is the most northerly village in England.

== History ==
Horncliffe is the most northerly village in England, built on a cliff above the banks of the River Tweed which forms the border with Scotland. In 1639 the army of King Charles I camped along the south of the river near to the area of Chain Bridge towards "Ourde" (now named Ord).

== Governance ==
Horncliffe is in the parliamentary constituency of North Northumberland.
