= Middleton, Northumberland =

Civil parish in Northumberland, England

Coordinates: 55.622°N 1.867°W

Middleton
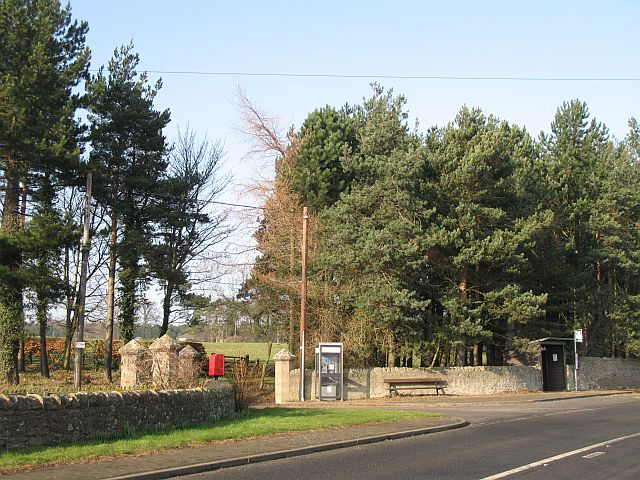

- Location within Northumberland
- Population: 115 [2011]
- OS grid reference: NU085365
- Unitary authority: Northumberland
- Ceremonial county: Northumberland
- Region: North East
- Country: England
- Sovereign state: United Kingdom
- Post town: BELFORD
- Postcode district: NE70
- Police: Northumbria
- Fire: Northumberland
- Ambulance: North East
- UK Parliament: North Northumberland

Middleton is a settlement and civil parish in Northumberland, England. The parish is situated on the North Sea coast, south of the island of Lindisfarne, and contains the villages of Ross, Detchant and Elwick; all are shrunken medieval villages. Both the A1 London to Edinburgh road and East Coast Main Line pass through the parish. In the 2001 census the parish had a population of 136, falling to 115 at the 2011 Census.

== Etymology ==
Middleton is one of many English place-names deriving from Old English middel 'middle' and tūn 'estate, settlement'; thus the name once meant 'middle settlement', perhaps because it performed a central function for a number of surrounding communities. The name of this particular example is first attested in 1201.

The name Detchant is first attested in 1166 as Dichende and comes from the Old English words dic 'ditch' and ende 'end', and thus once meant 'settlement at the end of a ditch'.

Elwick is first recorded between 1154 and 1166 as Ellewich. The name is thought to derive from an Old English personal name Ella and the word wīc 'dwelling place, farm'; thus it once meant 'Ella's farm'.

The name of Ross, first attested between 1208 and 1210, comes from the Brittonic language, the modern Welsh equivalent being rhos 'promontory', though in the case of the Northumberland Ross the word might originally have meant 'moor'.

== Governance ==
The parish is in the parliamentary constituency of Berwick-upon-Tweed.

== Landmarks ==
The Devil's Causeway passes the village of Middleton just over 1 mile (2 km) to the east. The causeway is a Roman road which starts at Port Gate on Hadrian's Wall, north of Corbridge, and extends 55 miles (89 km) northwards across Northumberland to the mouth of the River Tweed at Berwick-upon-Tweed.

Middleton Hall is a Grade II listed Tudor style mansion. After World War II it was sold to the Greenwich Hospital Trust. It has since been restored as a private residence.
