= Otterburn Tower =

Castellated country house hotel in Northumberland, England

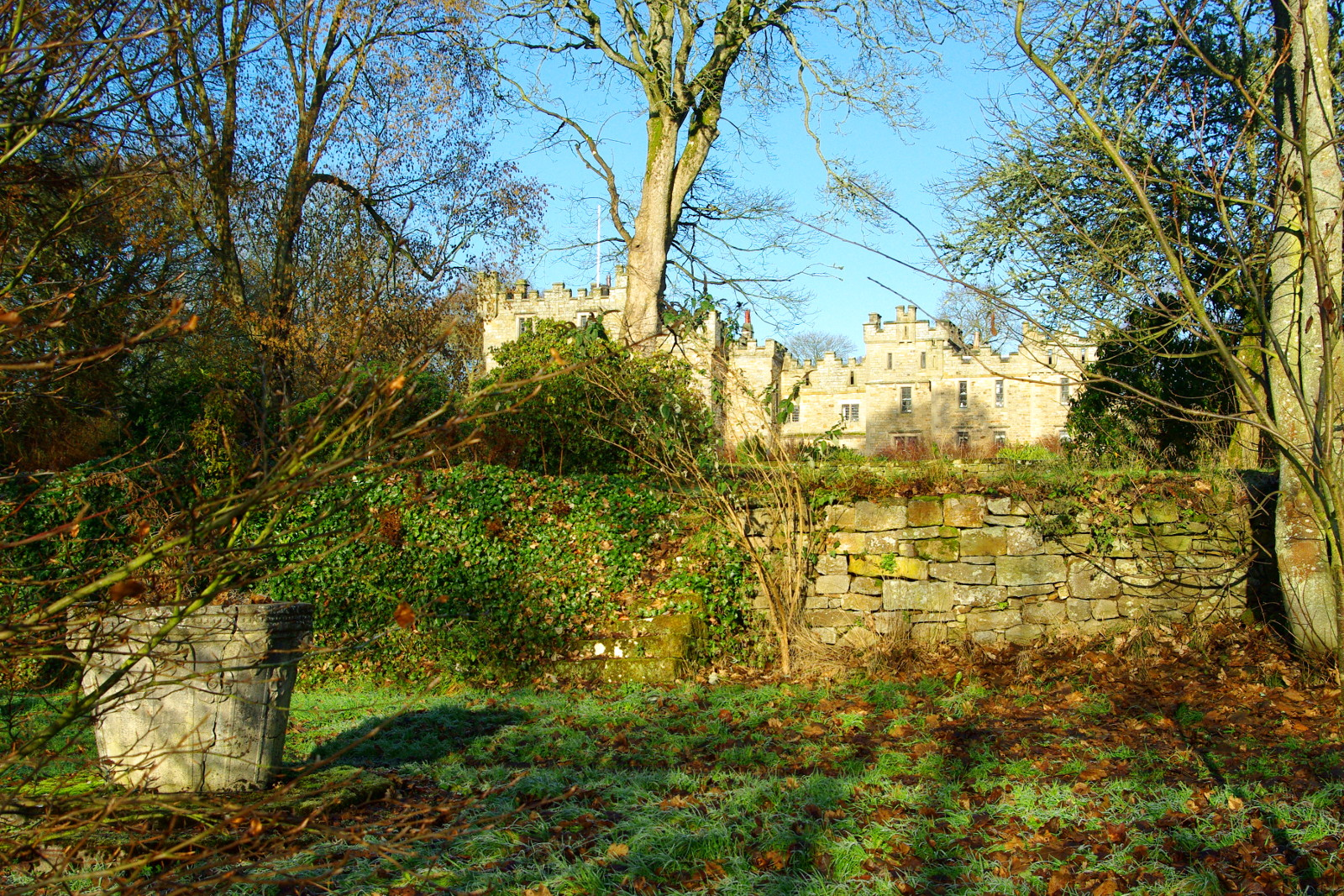
- Otterburn Tower and Castle in 2024

- Location within Northumberland

General information
- Location: Otterburn, Northumberland, England
- Coordinates: 55°13′57″N 2°10′40″W
- Completed: 1086; 1830

Otterburn Tower (sometimes spelled Otiburne; originally Otterburn Castle; currently Otterburn Tower Hotel) is a Grade II listed castellated, three star country house hotel in Otterburn, Northumberland. It is set in 32 acres (13 ha) of deer park and woodland in the Northumberland National Park in northeastern England. Founded by a cousin of William the Conqueror in 1086, it was later owned by the Clan Hall, before being rebuilt in 1830 by Thomas James, a magistrate, on the site and using some of the stones from Otterburn Castle. Nearby Otterburn Hall was built in 1870 on land given to a Lord Douglas as recompense for the death of his ancestor James Douglas, 2nd Earl of Douglas in the Battle of Otterburn.

== Geography ==
Otterburn Tower is situated on 32 acres (13 ha) north of Otterburn village, Northumberland. It is on the right bank of the River Rede within the Northumberland National Park, and is accessible by the A696 road along the Redesdale valley. Elsdon town is 3 miles (4.8 km) to its east, while Cramlington is 25 miles (40 km) to the southeast.

The tower is said to be "bosomed high in tufted trees". From the tower, a short walk by a burn leads to the moor; fishing is available on 3 miles (4.8 km) of riverbank along the Rede. Several spots are marked with stones set in circles, indicating ancient places of burial. Otterburn Hall, a fortified country house hotel, Otterburn Mill, and a quarry are nearby.

== History ==
Otterburn Tower was built on the site and using some of the stones from Otterburn Castle. Otterburn Castle, as it was originally known, was founded by a cousin of William the Conqueror in 1086 as a bastion to repel the Scots.

14th–16th centuries

In August 1388, during the Battle of Otterburn, initially, the Scottish forces had camped near the Redesdale valley close to the tower, in the evening. The next day, early in the morning, they attacked the Otterburn Tower but were unsuccessful in their attempt to capture it. Following this failure, the Scottish forces wanted to return to their homes but James Douglas, 2nd Earl of Douglas wanted to pursue the battle as Henry Percy (Hotspur) had vowed that he would not allow the Scots to leave the village Otterburn. The village then witnessed fierce battle between "the English and Scots, under the command of Henry Percy and Earl Douglas in which the former was taken prisoner and the latter was killed", on 19 August 1388. The scene of the battle, as reconstructed by historians, mentions that it took place about 0.5 miles (0.80 km) northwest of Otterburn village. By the beginning of the 15th century, the tower was held by Sir Robert Umfraville. It was owned by Clan Hall from at least the 1500s.

18th–19th centuries

One of its notable owners was Mad Jack Hall, a Jacobite rebel who was tried five times and finally executed at Tyburn for high treason on 13 July 1716, and his initials are still carved over one of the original doors. He had pleaded during the trial that as he was returning from a Justice’s meeting, he was surrounded by rebels and forced to go with them. In 1777, Percy Cross was placed near the tower to commemorate the Otterburn Battle site.

In the 1860s, Otterburn Castle was owned by Thomas James (1807-unknown), a magistrate, landholder, and farmer of 1,276 acres (516 ha); he was the son of William James (d. before 1822), of Otterburn Castle, and Elizabeth Woodhouse. Thomas James built Otterburn Tower over what was Otterburn Castle incorporating the masonry of an 18th-century house which contained an early building. No traces of the castle remain.

William James of Otterburn Towers, a Lt. of 42nd Highlanders, served in the Crimea and Indian Mutiny on 28 Feb 1838 and 9 April 1864, respectively. He was the son of Thomas James.

20th century

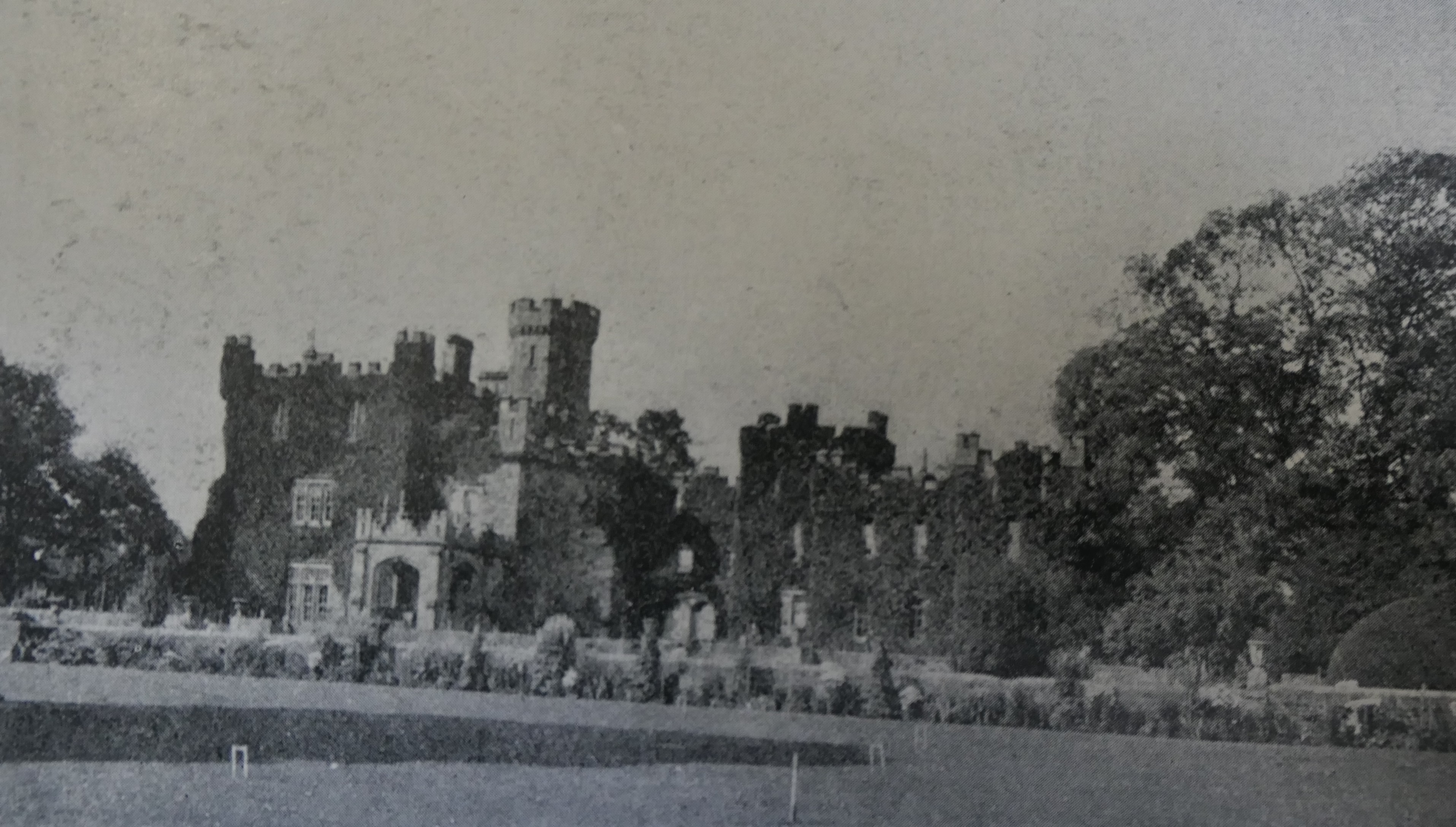
Otterburn Tower in 1905

In 1938, Sir Archibald White, 4th Baronet, of Tuxford and Wallingwells, bought the Otterburn Tower Estate. He and his family lived there for the bulk of The Second World War. Sir Archibald took command of the local Home Guard Battalion during the war and set about training and organising it. The decision to sell the estate was made in 1944 when the army's artillery range was extended further south, with the guns firing at longer range than was previously possible. The bulk of the estate was bought by the army for the firing ranges, which it remains today. Sir Archibald moved to the Torhousemuir Estate near Wigtown in Dumfries and Galloway.

Modern times

It became a Grade II listed building on 7 January 1988. In 2024, plans were announced to transform the castle into "a world-class wellness destination" with wedding venues, cabins, a spa, and festivals.

== Architecture and fittings ==
Otterburn is a castellated building. Much of the current building was constructed in 1830 incorporating an 18th-century tower and earlier architectural work as little of the original tower remained. The northern corner of the modern tower includes part of the walls of the old castle. The building was extended at the rear in 1904, and a stable block was added by F.W. Rich for Howard Pease.

== Grounds ==
Three Roman altar stones, said to have been brought from the nearby hamlet of Rochester – site of the Bremenium Roman fort – are situated at the entrance to the tower. The Douglas Monument, within a small clump of trees, contains a large upright stone which was originally a fireplace beam in Otterburn Castle, which was in the process of being demolished around the time the Douglas Monument was created.
