= Otterburn Hall =

Country house and estate in Northumberland, England

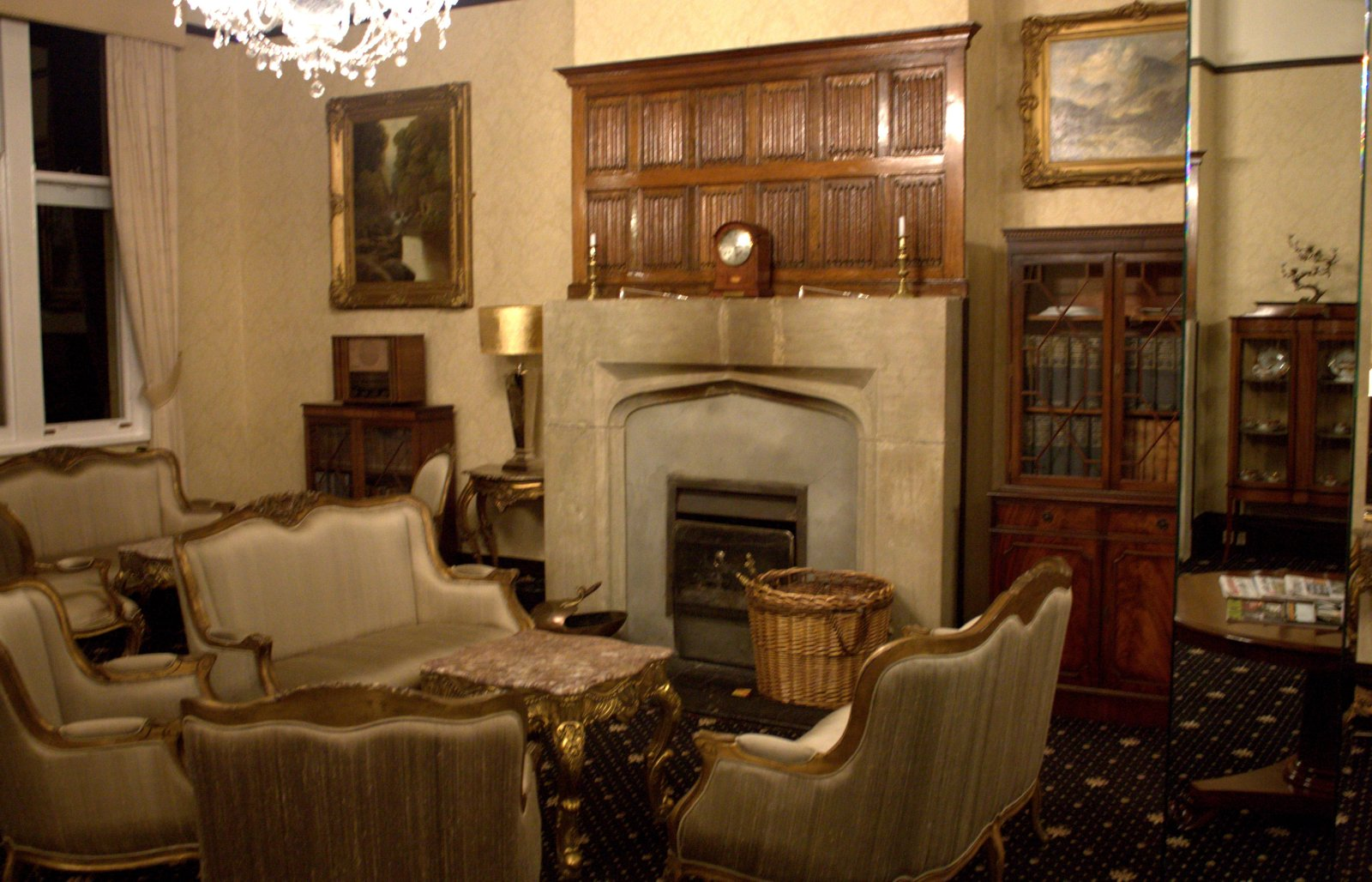

- Location within Northumberland

General information
- Architectural style: Neo-Elizabethan style
- Location: Near Otterburn, Northumberland, England
- Coordinates: 55°14′35″N 2°11′4″W
- Current tenants: Hotel
- Completed: 1086; 1830

Technical details
- Structural system: Brick with stone

Otterburn Hall is an English country house and estate in Otterburn, Northumberland. It is situated in 500 acres (200 ha) of deer park and woodland in the Northumberland National Park, northeastern England. The building was constructed in 1870 for Lord James Douglas, the land given to him as recompense for the death of Lord James Douglas, who fought at the Battle of Otterburn, and was killed near Otterburn Tower (originally a castle), itself founded in 1086, and rebuilt in 1830. Both Otterburn Hall and Otterburn Castle have been seats of landed gentry.

From 1980 to 2012, Otterburn Hall was used as a hotel. The house is Grade-II listed with English Heritage, and rated four-star by the Architectural Association School of Architecture.

== Geography ==
The English country house is situated in the Redesdale valley in a rural national park. It is north of Otterburn in Northumberland, and 25 miles (40 km) northwest of Cramlington. The hall's estate encompasses an area of 500 acres (200 ha) of deer park and woodland. An 8-mile (13 km) stretch of the River Rede flows close to the estate. There are several historical buildings nearby, including Otterburn Church, built in 1857; Otterburn Tower, a Grade II listed castellated mansion built in 1830 at the site of a medieval tower whose vestiges no longer remain; and Otterburn Mill, which dates to the 1800s.

== History ==
An older Otterburn Hall existed at least as early as 1777. At that time, Hugh Percy, 2nd Duke of Northumberland asked the hall's owner, Henry Ellison, for permission to erect a monument on the field to honour his ancestor who died during the Battle of Otterburn. Ellison denied the request and raised a monument himself which included an obelisk, possibly an architrave removed from Otterburn Hall's kitchen fireplace, which was placed into a socketed battle stone. This monument is open to the public by the side of the A696 road.

The present building was constructed in 1870 for Lord James Douglas on land gifted as recompense for the death of his ancestor, Lord Douglas, who fought at the Battle of Otterburn. Stables, lodges, and a farm were part of the 19th century complex. By 1907, Sir Charles Morrison-Bell, 1st Bart., was the owner of Otterburn Hall. During World War II, from 1940 to 1944, the hotel was used as a military hospital. The Otterburn Training Area, established in 1911 and owned by the Ministry of Defence, is nearby and is the second-largest live firing range in the country. In 1948, the Hall was acquired by a group of Christian businessmen who wanted to start a new venture in Christian education. By 1980, the building was converted into a hotel.

The hotel was owned by the YMCA until 2002, when it was sold to the London-based Angel Group. The hotel was closed suddenly in 2012. The adjacent estate property called The Coach House, trading as a quality restaurant with bedrooms, also ceased business in July 2017 but reopened with new management the same year.

The Lodge Village, now under private plot ownership, was in July 2017 being extended, adding 40 more units, in a style similar to a caravan park layout. The original lake and island are still present within the estate, though it is now unsafe for children or teens to visit, as while the old zip wire, landing deck and wire bridge to the island are still present, no safety warnings or barriers exist.

== Architecture and fittings ==
The building, in Neo-Elizabethan style, is constructed of brick with stone dressings. Renovation occurred in 1905 for Sir Charles Morrison Bell including the addition of a porch which accentuates the facade of the hall. Another renovation occurred in 1930 subsequent to a fire. A large conservatory is located in the rear of the building. The hall has had its own landing ground since the early 1930s. Otterburn Hall contained 65 rooms and a restaurant.
