= Ramshope =

Hamlet in Northumberland, England

Coordinates: 55.3338°N 2.4192°W

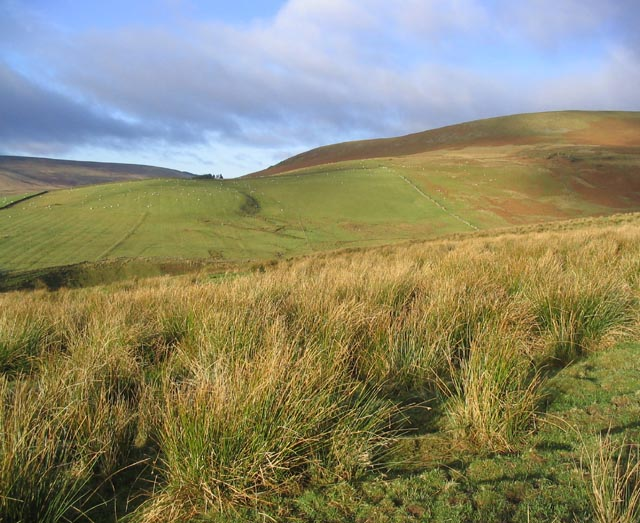

- Location within Northumberland
- OS grid reference: NT735045
- Civil parish: Rochester
- Unitary authority: Northumberland
- Ceremonial county: Northumberland
- Region: North East
- Country: England
- Sovereign state: United Kingdom
- Post town: Newcastle upon Tyne
- Postcode district: NE19
- Police: Northumbria
- Fire: Northumberland
- Ambulance: North East
- UK Parliament: Hexham

Ramshope is a hamlet and former civil parish, now in the parish of Rochester in Northumberland, England located in Northumberland National Park. It lies on the A68 road, between Byrness and Carter Bar on the Scottish border. In 1881 the parish had a population of 13.

There are very few houses in Ramshope today, including a farm and Ramshope Lodge, both located on the A68 road. The name can also be found in Ramshope Burn, a tributary of the Catcleugh Reservoir and the River Rede.

== Governance ==
Ramshope was formerly an extra-parochial tract, from 1858 Ramshope was a civil parish in its own right until it was abolished on 25 March 1886 to form Rochester Ward.
