= Cottonshopeburnfoot =

Hamlet in Northumberland, England

Coordinates: 55°18′19″N 2°20′50″W

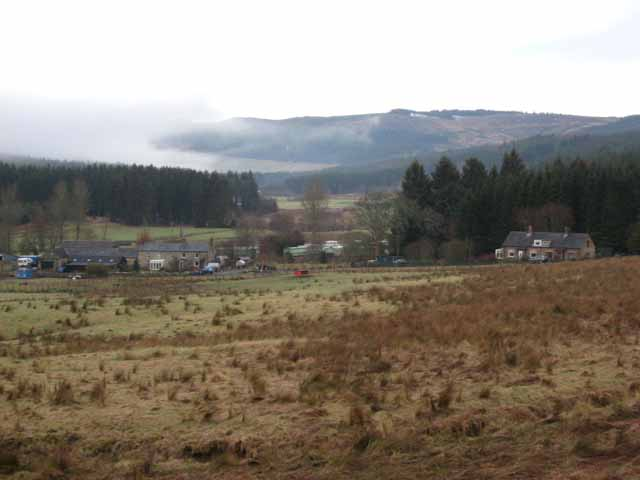

- Location within Northumberland
- Civil parish: Rochester
- Unitary authority: Northumberland
- Shire county: Northumberland
- Region: North East
- Country: England
- Sovereign state: United Kingdom
- Post town: Newcastle-upon-Tyne
- Postcode district: NE19
- Police: Northumbria
- Fire: Northumberland
- Ambulance: North East
- UK Parliament: Hexham

Cottonshopeburnfoot is a hamlet in Redesdale in Northumberland, England. It lies on the A68 road, 2 miles south east of the village of Byrness. The hamlet takes its name from the river named Cottonshope Burn, which flows into the River Rede here.

The Pennine Way passes through the hamlet.

The place claims to have the longest name in England, closely followed by the neighbouring hamlet of Blakehopeburnhaugh. The place is also spelt Cottonshopeburn Foot, which would make Blakehopeburnhaugh the longest name, but the Ordnance Survey favours the single-word name.
