= St Cuthbert's Church, Elsdon =

Church in Elsdon, Northumberland, England

Coordinates: 55.233417°N 2.101231°W

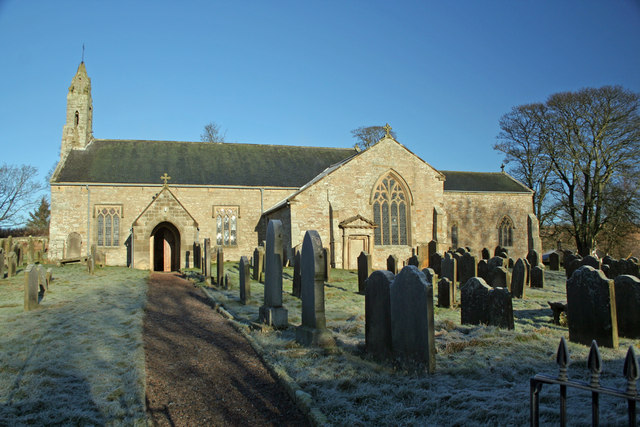
St Cuthbert's Church, Elsdon

St Cuthbert's Church is located in Elsdon, Alnwick, northeast England. The church was one of the resting places of St. Cuthbert's body during the wanderings of the monks. It is one of the many dedicated to his memory. St Cuthbert's Church is a Grade I listed building in Northumberland.

== Geography ==
St. Cuthbert's is situated within Elsdon's 7.5 acres (3.0 ha) village green. Larger in size than many Northumbrian churches, it is situated close to the fortified vicarage. It is 21 miles (34 km) west-northwest of Morpeth. The village and church are located along St. Cuthbert's Way.

== Architecture and fittings ==
The church shows evidence of extensive later medieval rebuilding. The cause may have been damage at the time of the 1388 Battle of Otterburn. The ceiling over the nave and the transept aisles form quadrants, and slabs exist across the structure. Of the present church, there are two transepts: one called Anderson's porch, and the other, Hedley's porch. The building had a leper window. There are several deep cuts on one of the pillars of the arcade of the south aisle, which are of a different character from masons' marks, and considered likely to have been made by the sharpening of weapons upon them.

In some country parishes in large sparsely-inhabited districts, it was expedient to build hearse-houses against the churches for the convenience of keeping a hearse for the use of the parishioners; one was built against the shady north side of the chancel of Elsdon's church. The rectory house is an old tower with a circular staircase at one corner. Its lowest story is spanned with one large arch. On its front arch are the arms of the Hunfranvilles, with an inscription beneath.

== History ==
The first church at Elsdon was probably constructed of oak, with a roof made of rushes. A subsequent church has few remaining features still in existence: Norman pilasters and two small Norman windows in the west gable, dating to circa 1100 or earlier. Most of the current construction dates back to the 14th century. St John the Evangelist's Church in Otterburn is a chapel-of-ease to St. Cuthbert's.

The monks of Lindisfarne, during their flight from the Danes, halted for a while with the relics of St. Cuthbert on what is now the site of Elsdon Church.

1877

During the 1877 church restoration, it was necessary to change the levels of the church flooring. The flooring was damp; the bases of the pillars were nearly covered and out of sight because of soil accumulation. The reduction of soil levels in the nave, transepts, and chancel led to the discovery of an immense collection of skeletons. The labourers reported that 996 whole skulls were re-interred, as well as a large number that were mutilated in the course of their removal. The remains of nearly 1200 of the former chief inhabitants of the district were disturbed and removed from their resting place, while approximately 300 or 400 were left where found. The skeletons appeared to have been disturbed by the interment of those more recently buried. No doubt the intramural interments had taken place during hundreds of years, the last having occurred in the late 18th century. The bones of the earlier deceased had frequently been moved to make room for their successors. Skulls were frequently found lying together in groups of three or four in one spot. No remains other than bones were found, with the exception of a very few coffin handles, with a little decayed wood, and in one instance a small quantity of hair. It is possible that some bodies had been buried here after the Battle of Otterburn.

Also in 1877, it was necessary to pull down the small spire, which terminated at the bell turret surmounting the church's western gable. In the spire, immediately over the bell, a small chamber was discovered, without any opening, and in it, nearly filling the cavity, were three horse skulls. When found, the three skulls were standing on their bases in a triangular form, mouths upwards, and leaning against each other at the top; the cavity seemed to have been purposely prepared for them. There were two large skulls and one smaller; two were well preserved, while one was decayed. The heads appeared to be two of draught horses, and one of a cob. The reason for placing skulls in the bell turret may have been to increase the resonance.
