= Otterburn Hall and Tower =

Otterburn Hall and Tower may refer to:

- Otterburn Hall, built c. 1870
- Otterburn Tower, built c. 1086, and again c. 1830
