= Mad Jack =

Mad Jack may refer to:

== People ==
- John Byron (British Army officer) (1756–1791), English captain, father of Lord Byron
- Jack Churchill (1906–1996), British World War II lieutenant colonel who fought armed with a longbow, arrows, and a Scottish broadsword sword, and carried around bagpipes
- Mad Jack Fuller (1757–1834), English politician, noted for building a number of follies in Sussex
- Mad Jack Hall (1672–1716), Jacobite leader
- Charles Howard, 20th Earl of Suffolk (1906–1941), World War II bomb disposal expert
- John Mytton (1796–1834), English eccentric and rake
- John Percival (1779–1862), US Navy captain
- Siegfried Sassoon (1886–1967), English First World War poet, writer and soldier

== Fictional characters ==
- two of the various Jack O'Lantern (Marvel Comics) villains
- the title character of Mad Jack the Pirate, a 1990s cartoon
