= Elsdon Castle =

Castle in the village of Elsdon in Northumberland, England

- Northumberland, England, UK
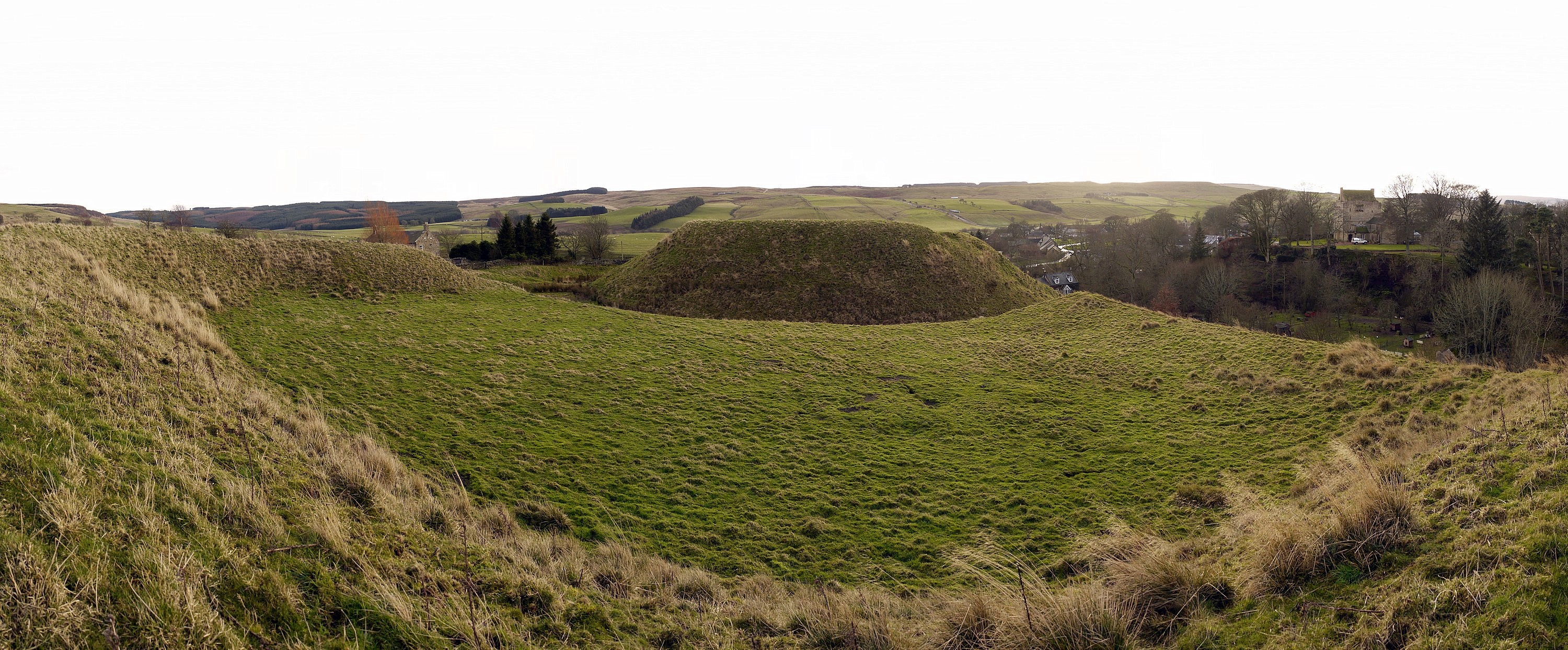
- Elsdon Castle

Location
- Location in Northumberland
- Coordinates: 55.2356°N 2.0974°W
- Grid reference: NY939935

Elsdon Castle is a castle in the village of Elsdon about 10 miles (16 km) to the southwest of Rothbury, in Northumberland, England, and also known as Mote Hills. The site is a Scheduled Ancient Monument.

The castle is the best preserved medieval motte and bailey castle site in Northumberland. It was built by Robert de Umfraville in 1076, not long after the Norman Conquest and stands on a natural spur of a hill. The site is open to the public without charge. It consists of a 15-metre (49 ft) high and 80-metre (260 ft) wide tall mound or motte to the south, with an embanked crescent-shaped bailey to the north.

Elsdon Castle is thought to have been abandoned after it was superseded by the nearby Harbottle Castle in 1160. It was abandoned by the mid-13th century, and is not mentioned in the estate of Gilbert de Umfraville when he died in 1245.

Legend has gathered around the castle. According to one tale a Danish giant lived on the hill and terrorised the neighbourhood. This may be a reference to Siward the Dane, earl of Northumberland in the reign of Edward the Confessor.

In the 18th century, excavation around the side revealed a Roman stone, which may have come from the fort at High Rochester and re-used for building. A pottery vessel is believed to have been discovered in the 19th century.

Elsdon Tower is nearby: a pele tower dating from the late 14th or early 15th century, which may also have been built by the de Umfravilles, though for six hundred years it was the Elsdon Rectory until 1961, when it was converted to private buildings.
