= Percy Cross =

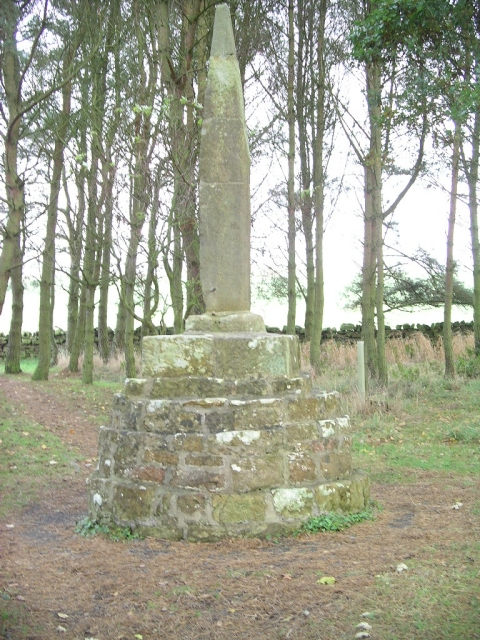
- Percy's Cross, northwest of Otterburn

- Location in Northumberland
- 55.2370°N 2.1947°W
- Location: Northumberland, England, UK
- OS grid reference: NY8771793664

The Percy Cross (also Battle Stone) is located just off the A696, 1 kilometre (0.62 mi) from Otterburn, Northumberland, England. It was erected before 1400 to commemorate the Battle of Otterburn, which took place in 1388, and takes its name from Henry Percy, 1st Earl of Northumberland whose two sons took part in the battle. The memorial was restored and re-erected in 1777, and again in modern day, to include signage. The Percy Cross is a sandstone memorial which includes a square stepped base, approximately 1 metre (3 ft 3 in) in height and 2 metres (6 ft 7 in) in diameter.

The entire battlefield area is designated an Area of High Landscape Value and parts of it are contained within the Northumberland National Park. On 7 January 1988, Percy Cross became a Grade II listed building.

== History ==
In Armstrong's 1769 map of Northumberland, he marked the spot with a cross, called "Battle Stone". Another monument, now called Percy's Cross, was erected by Henry Ellison upon the spot where James Douglas, 2nd Earl of Douglas is said to have fallen.

Battle Stone

The original stone measured 3 feet (0.91 m) in length and, by the later 18th century, rather than standing up, it lay in an oblique direction as it was too small for the socket or base in which it was placed. The top of the socket was exposed with stones around it. The spot where it stood was east from the present cross.

Percy Cross

In 1777, Hugh Percy, 1st Duke of Northumberland wanted to build on the spot some memorial of the battle that was associated with his family. But the proprietor of the land, Henry Ellison, fearing that Percy might attach some claim either to what was put up, or the ground on which it was to stand, declined the proposal, and resolved to erect one himself. Instead of re-building in the spot consecrated by the original stone, Ellison chose another site within view of the highway, so that what he built might be viewable by those who passed by the newly created turnpike road up Redesdale. It is said to have been raised at a "trifling expense".

== Architecture ==
The monument is a circular pedestal of rough masonry, about 8 feet (2.4 m) in diameter at the bottom, and more than 5 feet (1.5 m) in height. It tapers to the top. The centre of it includes the old socket which belonged to the previous stone. An old architrave from the kitchen fireplace at Otterburn Hall was inserted into it. The cross section of this stone is 15.3 feet (4.7 m). It has a beveled corner along its length, and two small pieces of iron project from a side. On its top is another stone, tapering to a point. The socket is a worn, weather-beaten sandstone, about 2 feet (0.61 m) square and has the appearance of having been in use much longer than any of the other stones.
