= Elsdon Tower =

Building in Northumberland, England

Coordinates: 55.2346°N 2.1021°W

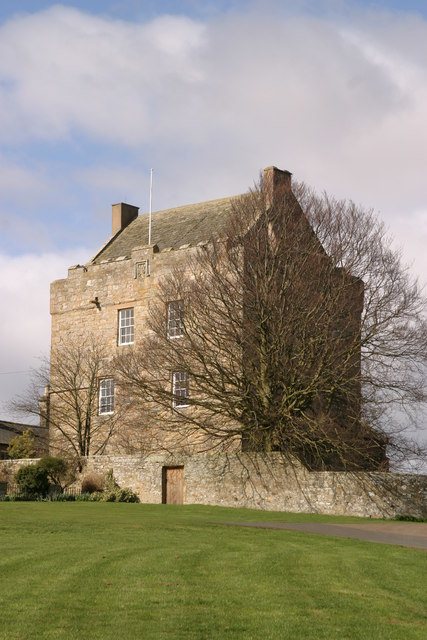
- Elsdon Tower

- Location within Northumberland
- OS grid reference: NY93609339
- Shire county: Northumberland
- Region: North East
- Country: England
- Sovereign state: United Kingdom
- Police: Northumbria
- Fire: Northumberland
- Ambulance: North East

Elsdon Tower is a Grade I listed medieval tower house converted for use as a Rectory situated at Elsdon, Northumberland. Originally part of the estate of Elsdon Castle, it later became a rectory and is now a private residence. The original construction dates from the 15th century and has been modified several times.

== History ==
The property was first recorded as Vicars Pele, a pele tower in the occupation of the Rector of Elsdon in 1415. There is nearby a medieval motte and bailey castle, which was built by Robert de Umfraville and is known as Elsdon Castle.

The tower originally contained four storeys, was reduced in the 17th century to only three with a steeply sloping roof above a castellated parapet. It is 13.15 by 9.4 metres (43.1 ft × 30.8 ft), with the longer side running from west-north-west to east-south-east. The walls are about 2.6 metres (8 ft 6 in) thick. It has a timber roof. The parapets display the crest of the Umfraville family, who lived in the area but abandoned Eldon Castle for Harbottle Castle.

Subsequent buildings have been adjoined on the north and west of the tower. Between 1820–1826, Archdeacon Singleton built an entrance porch and a two-storey, two-bayed house extension.

The tower was Grade I listed in 1953. It was in use as the Rectory until 1960. It was fully renovated and restored between 1995 and 1998, which included a significant amount of archaeological research during the works. The only remaining features of the original 15th century construction are a garderobe and fireplace on the original first floor. The tower is closed to the public but access is available to view it from nearby.
