= Clan Hall =

Family tree

Clan Hall is a Scottish clan.

== Border Reivers ==
The Halls were one of the sixty major riding families of the Scottish Marches and were involved in reiving as other border clans were. During one of the 'Day of Truce' occasions, a Robert Spragon 'fyled' a complaint against two Halls that had rustled 120 sheep. As with all Reiving families, they would consider themselves loyal to neither the English or the Scots, the family name holding allegiance over all else. As recounted in the song "The Death of Parcy Reed", the Halls betray and stand idly by as the Laird of Troughend, Parcy Reed is murdered by the Crosier Clan. A betrayal that was to add to their reputation as one of the most notorious of families, and lead to their downfall whereupon they were forced to leave the Marches.

== Traditional Homes of Clan Hall ==
The traditional homes of the Halls were at Redesdale, East Teviotdale, and Liddesdale. Other Halls lived in Aynstrother; Glenryg, in the barony of Lesmahagow; Garvald; Irvide; Glasgow; Sancharmvr, in Preswick; and Perth.

== Battle of Otterburn ==
The village of Otterburn, Northumberland, known for the famous battle and border ballad of the same name, contains an old Pele tower that was owned at one time by the Umfravilles. The property passed into the possession of the Hall family. A Hall by the name of 'Mad Jack Hall' lived at Otterburn Hall, now a Hotel, and was also hanged, drawn and quartered at Tyburn for his participation in the 1715 Jacobite Rebellion.

== 17th century ==
By 1600, many branches had developed in England and Scotland: Lord Llanover, Sir John Hall, Bishop Hall of Bristol, Bishop Hall of Wearmouth, and at the same time, continuing their interest and seats at Skelton Castle, Yorkshire, Greatford Hall in Lincolnshire, and Gravell House in Middlesex. Notable amongst the family at this time was Hall of Berwickshire.

== Clan Hall Society ==
Clan Hall Society was founded in Pikeville, KY. in August 1993 with 23 charter members. Atlas D. Hall, FSA Scot, was the first President and served until his death in November 2006. John Hall became the 2nd President for Clan Hall from 2006 to June 2024. Kevin Hall is the 3rd and current President; he was elected in June 2024. In June of 2025, Kevin Hall stepped down as President, due to medical reasons, and Steve Hall is the Interim President, making him the fourth President for Clan Hall Society. From the original membership it has grown, and membership extends throughout the United States. They have a registered tartan Hall 1992. The Society emblem is a talbot head over 3 cranes. The motto is "Per Ardua ad Alta" meaning "Through difficulties to Heaven". The Society invites members of the families of Hall, Halle, Haule, Haul, Hal, DeAule, Haw, Crispin, Collingwood, Fitzwilliam and others interested in Border Reiver history.
