= George Heron (MP) =

16th-century English politician

George Heron (c. 1515 – 7 June 1575), of Chipchase, Northumberland, was an English politician.

He was a member (MP) of the parliament of England for Northumberland in 1555.

Heron was killed at the Raid of the Redeswire.
