= Rochester, Northumberland =

Coordinates: 55.280°N 2.261°W

Rochester
- village
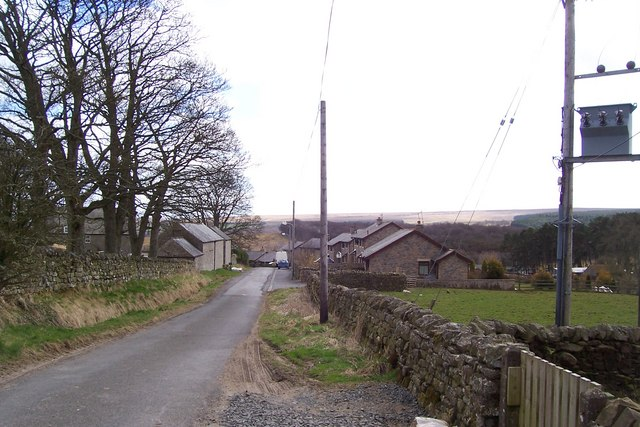

- Location within Northumberland
- Population: 344 (2011 census)
- OS grid reference: NY835985
- Civil parish: Rochester
- Unitary authority: Northumberland
- Ceremonial county: Northumberland
- Region: North East
- Country: England
- Sovereign state: United Kingdom
- Post town: NEWCASTLE UPON TYNE
- Postcode district: NE19
- Dialling code: 01830
- Police: Northumbria
- Fire: Northumberland
- Ambulance: North East
- UK Parliament: Hexham

Rochester is a small village and civil parish in north Northumberland, England. It is 5 miles (8 km) north-west of Otterburn on the A68 road between Corbridge and Jedburgh. The village is the site of the Roman fort of Bremenium, built there to protect the important Roman road of Dere Street, which passes through the village.

The civil parish extends north west of the village to the Scottish border. It includes the settlements of Byrness, Horsley, Ramshope and Cottonshopeburnfoot, and the now closed Redesdale Camp, an army base in the Otterburn Training Area. In the 2001 census (when Redesdale Camp was open) the parish had a population of 358, reducing to 344 at the 2011 Census.

== Governance ==
Rochester is in the parliamentary constituency of Hexham. Rochester was formerly a township in Elsdon parish, in 1866 Rochester became a civil parish in its own right, on 25 March 1886 Rochester was merged with Ramshope to form Rochester Ward, on 1 April 1958 Rochester Ward was merged with Troughend to form "Rochester".

== Climate ==
Rochester has an oceanic climate (Köppen: Cfb).

Climate data for Redesdale Camp (211 m or 692 ft asl, averages 1991–2020)
Month	Jan	Feb	Mar	Apr	May	Jun	Jul	Aug	Sep	Oct	Nov	Dec	Year
Mean daily maximum °C (°F)	5.6 (42.1)	6.2 (43.2)	8.4 (47.1)	11.2 (52.2)	14.3 (57.7)	16.9 (62.4)	18.8 (65.8)	18.3 (64.9)	15.9 (60.6)	12.1 (53.8)	8.3 (46.9)	5.8 (42.4)	11.8 (53.3)
Daily mean °C (°F)	2.9 (37.2)	3.1 (37.6)	4.6 (40.3)	6.7 (44.1)	9.5 (49.1)	12.3 (54.1)	14.1 (57.4)	13.8 (56.8)	11.5 (52.7)	8.4 (47.1)	5.2 (41.4)	2.8 (37.0)	7.9 (46.2)
Mean daily minimum °C (°F)	0.1 (32.2)	0.0 (32.0)	0.9 (33.6)	2.2 (36.0)	4.6 (40.3)	7.7 (45.9)	9.4 (48.9)	9.3 (48.7)	7.2 (45.0)	4.8 (40.6)	2.0 (35.6)	−0.1 (31.8)	4.0 (39.2)
Average precipitation mm (inches)	100.5 (3.96)	84.5 (3.33)	65.5 (2.58)	57.7 (2.27)	57.8 (2.28)	65.3 (2.57)	74.0 (2.91)	81.8 (3.22)	67.9 (2.67)	91.7 (3.61)	95.4 (3.76)	98.8 (3.89)	940.8 (37.04)
Average precipitation days	16.2	12.9	12.8	11.2	11.4	11.5	12.5	12.6	12.1	14.9	15.3	15.3	158.6
Source: Met Office.
