= Raid of the Redeswire =

1575 Anglo-Scottish border skirmish

Coordinates: 55°21′23″N 02°28′33″W

- Part of Anglo-Scottish Wars
Date	7 July 1575
Location	Carter Bar, by the Cheviot Hills, near Redesdale
Result	Scottish victory

Belligerents
Kingdom of England	Kingdom of Scotland

Commanders and leaders
Sir John Forster (POW)	Sir John Carmichael

Strength
Unknown	Unknown

Casualties and losses
25 dead, unknown wounded	2 dead, several wounded

The Raid of the Redeswire, also known as the Redeswire Fray, was a border skirmish between England and Scotland on 7 July 1575 which took place at Carter Bar, the Cheviot pass which enters Redesdale. The skirmish was between the English Warden of the Middle Marches, Sir John Forster, with George Heron, Keeper of Redesdale, Keeper of Liddesdale and Scottish Warden and Sir John Carmichael, the Lord Warden of the Marches, with George Douglas of Bonjedworth. It was the last battle between the Kingdom of England and the Kingdom of Scotland.

== Opposing forces ==
After the Scottish defeat at Pinkie in 1547, no Anglo-Scottish battle had occurred until this. Sir John Carmichael met Sir John Forster at a hill called Red Swire ("Redeswire" in Scottish English) in Carter Bar for a regularly scheduled "Truce Day" wherein the two discussed matters that came up between their two regions. Both men were accompanied by a number of armed guards.

== Battle ==
One of the topics discussed during this meeting was an Englishman who had stolen some items from a Scotsman and who was supposedly in Forster's custody. Carmichael demanded that the man be delivered to Scotland for justice, but Forster replied the thief had taken "leg-bail" (escaped from custody) and could not be produced. This turned into an argument that involved personal insults from both parties, until members of the English contingent could no longer hold their temper and a fight broke out, which resulted in two Scots being killed and several others wounded. The Scots were forced to retreat, but during their flight they met up with another group from Jedburgh, who were late to the meeting. This gave the Scots an advantage and encouraged them to engage with the English. They began to break the English lines and in time, the English were routed: the Scots proved victorious, and drove the English off. George Heron was killed, along with his brother, John, and 23 other Englishmen. Forster, Francis Russell son of the Earl of Bedford, and several other nobles were captured, and the Scots conducted an impromptu raid, taking 300 cattle from local farms.

== Aftermath ==
The prisoners were brought to James Douglas, 4th Earl of Morton, who was the regent for King James VI. This soon became embarrassing for the Scots, as the prisoners, who were being held at Dalkeith Castle, had likely been taken for their ransom value, although Regent Morton stated that it was to keep them from being killed in retaliation. Morton wrote a letter to Queen Elizabeth describing the events, and was about to send his envoy Nicolas Elphinstone to London, but she was outraged and sent Nicolas Errington and Henry Killigrew to demand immediate satisfaction.

Regent Morton was directed to meet with Henry Hastings, 3rd Earl of Huntingdon, who was President of the Council of the North, to work out the details, and the two men were able to come to an amicable solution, as Morton was inclined not to anger Elizabeth, and she wanted to avoid a war. Forster, Cuthbert Collingwood, and the other prisoners had been treated with kindness and were released with gifts and an apology for being held. Carmichael was delivered to York as a prisoner for trial, but was acquitted as the English court found that Forster had engaged in an unprovoked attack. Elizabeth had made arrangements to reward her sympathisers among the Scottish nobility with pensions, but after Redeswire these plans were cancelled.

== Legacy ==
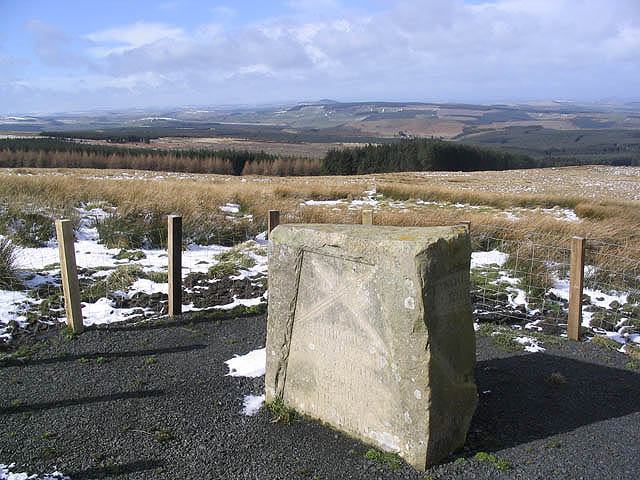
The Redeswire Stone

The story of the skirmish was turned into a border ballad edited and published by Walter Scott.

Also, on the Cheviot Hills, near the place where the battle was fought a monument known as the Redeswire Stone was built in commemoration of the battle. It reads, "On this ridge, July 7th, 1575 was fought one of the last border raids, known as The Raid of the Redeswire". The battle is commemorated annually by the Jethart Callant's Festival each year during their Redeswire Rideout; this ride is held on the first Saturday in July and is in excess of 25 miles. During this Rideout the Jethart Callant can be seen galloping towards the "Redeswire Stane" giving the immortal battle cry of "Jethart's Here".

A song commemorating this battle has been written by Alan G Brydon. Three songs are recognised by the Callant festival as songs are sung as a custom on the last day.
