= Otterburn Mill =

Mill in Northumberland, England

Coordinates: 55°13′52″N 2°10′43″W

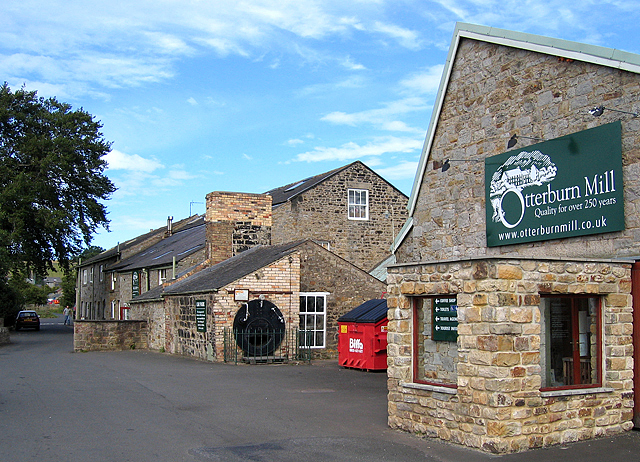
Otterburn Mill

Otterburn Mill is a former textile mill in Otterburn, Northumberland, northeast England. It lies just south of the Otterburn Tower along the A696 road next to a bridge over the River Rede. It was owned by the Waddell family for many years and is over 250 years old. The mill is noted for its pram rugs and its crowning moment was on the birth of Princess Elizabeth in 1926, when Buckingham Palace contacted the mill requesting a rug for the royal pram.

Up until 2025 Otterburn Mill functioned as a shop selling outdoor, country and lifestyle clothing for men, women and children; there was also an onsite café. Much of the historic machinery could still be seen and the history of the Waddell family was showcased across the site. In June that year it closed, with the loss of 28 jobs; the property was subsequently put on the market for £720,000.

== History ==
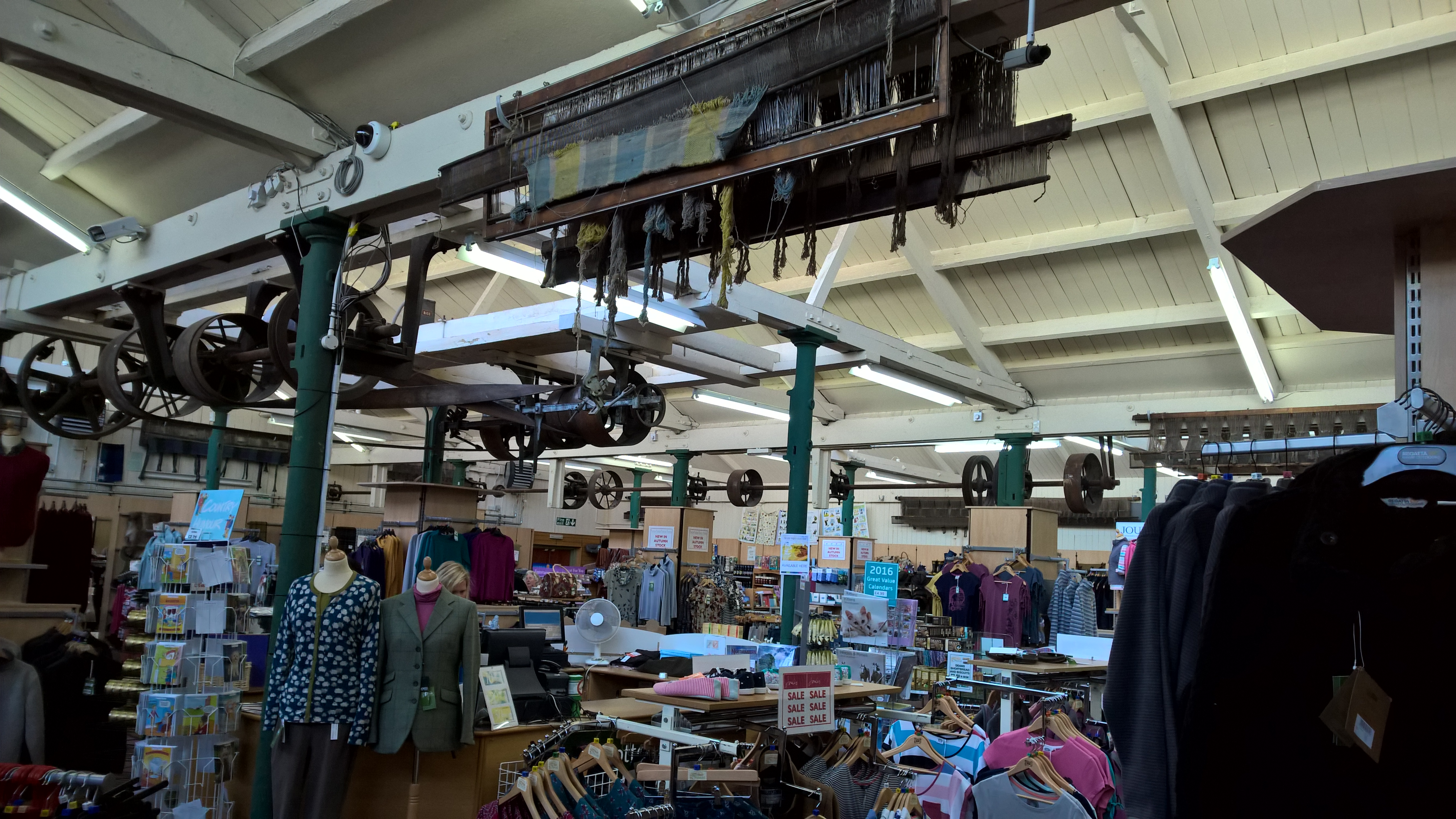
The interior of the shop in 2015

Dating from the 18th century, Otterburn Mill was leased in 1821 to William Waddell. (Waddell, the son of a Jedburgh wool manufacturer, had recently arrived in the area having eloped across the border from Scotland with his young bride, Charlotte Ferrier). What began as a cottage industry grew, under successive generations of Waddells, into a factory-based operation as production became increasingly mechanised. In 1910 a diesel engine was installed, which drove banks of power looms via line shafts in the main workshop (the engine and line shafting still remain in place).

In the twentieth century, Otterburn Mill became 'a brand leader in woven cloths'; its distinctive tweeds were used by some of the leading fashion houses of Europe, including Dior, Balmain, Schiaparelli and Paquin. They were also popular for rural pursuits among the aristocracy and Queen Alexandra was a keen purchaser of the mill's wares.

By the 1970s the textile industry in Britain had gone into decline; manufacturing ceased at Otterburn in December 1976. Twenty years later John Waddell sold the buildings to Euan Pringle; they were converted into a shop selling outdoor and country clothing, with historic machinery and other items retained for display.

On 1st May 2025, the Mill was put up for sale by its current owner, Euan Pringle, but a month later it went into liquidation and the business closed.

== Gallery ==
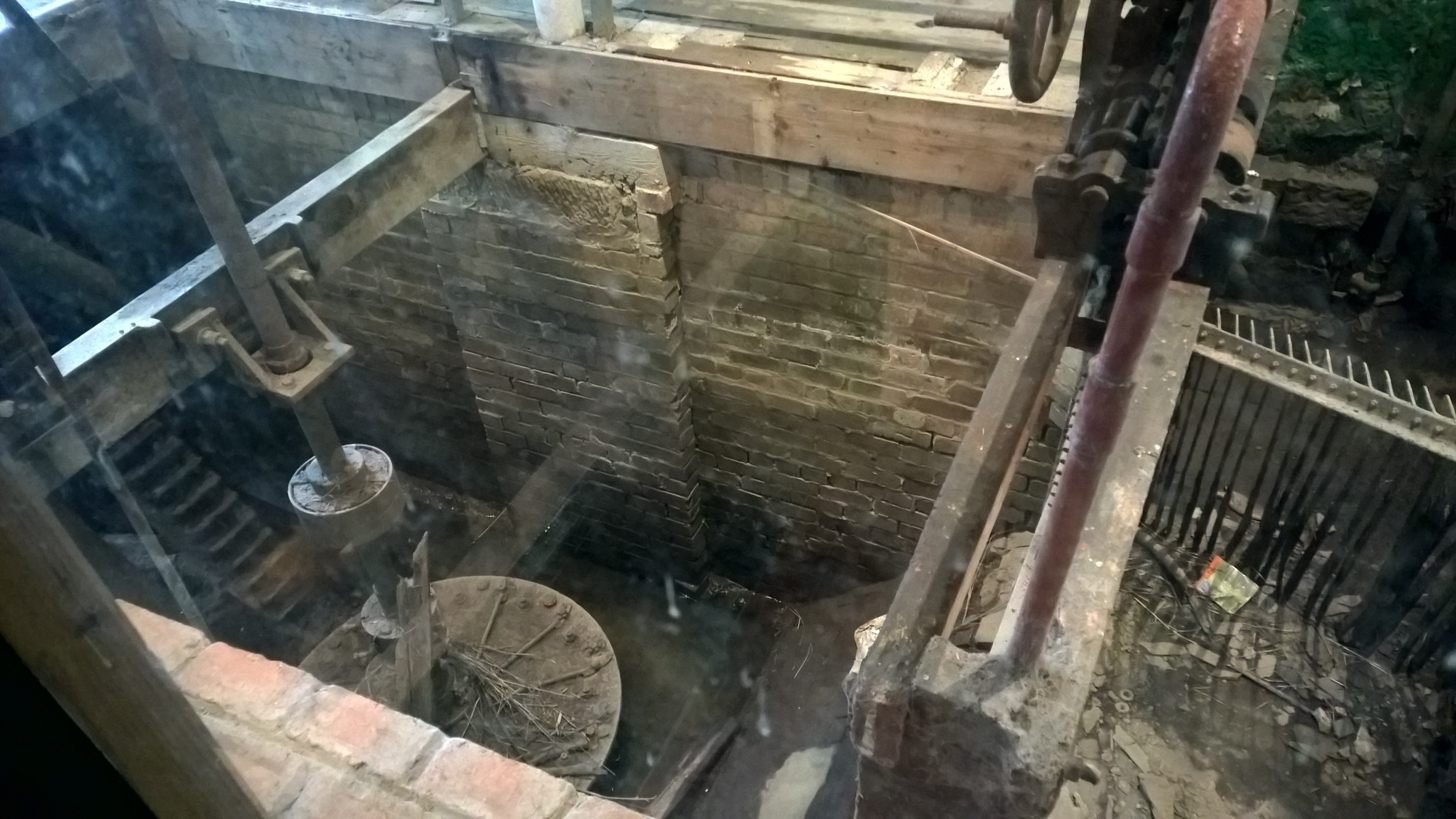
This water turbine powered the mill from 1890 until the 1950s (replacing a pair of water wheels).

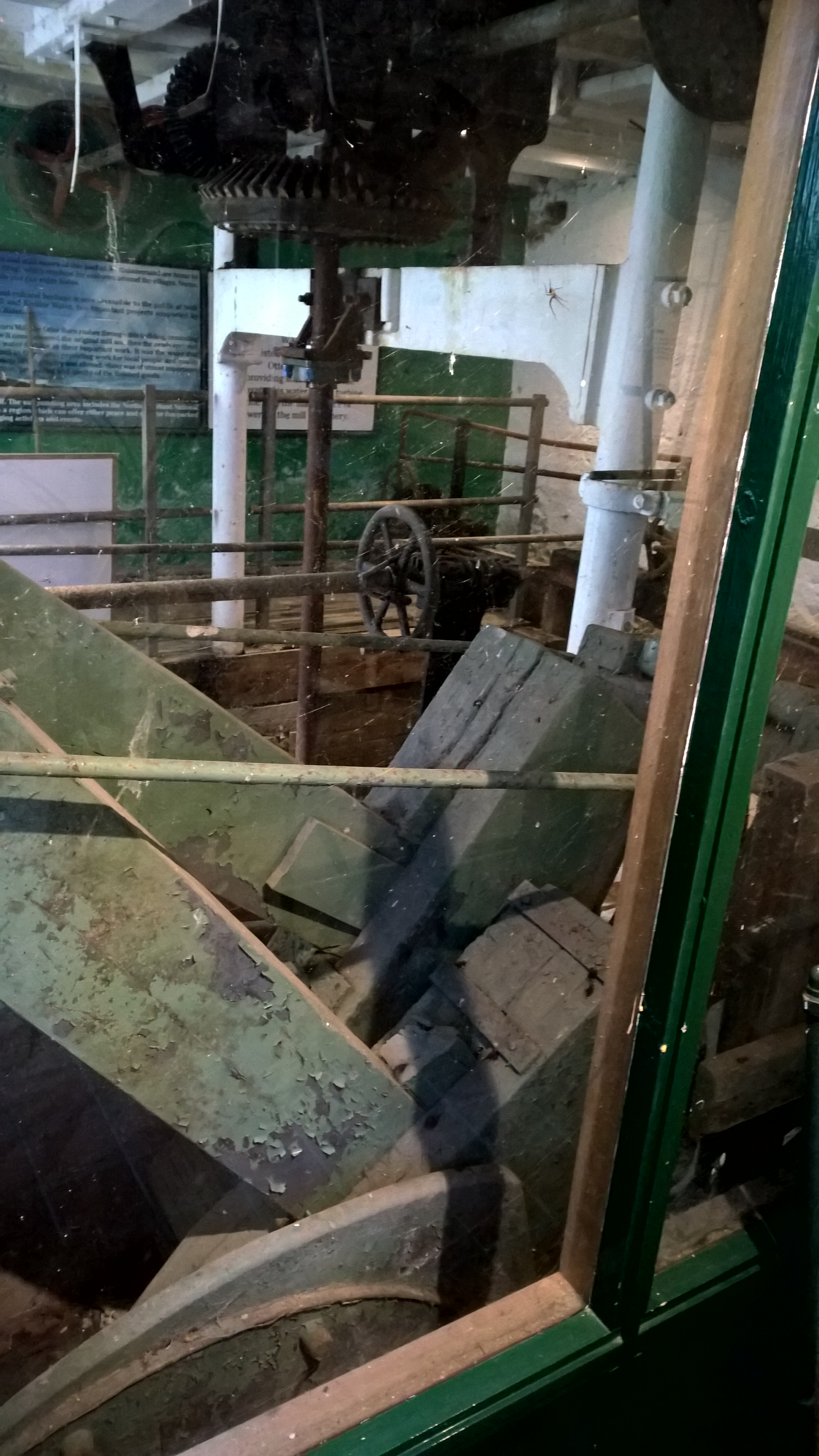
Fulling stocks (19th century).

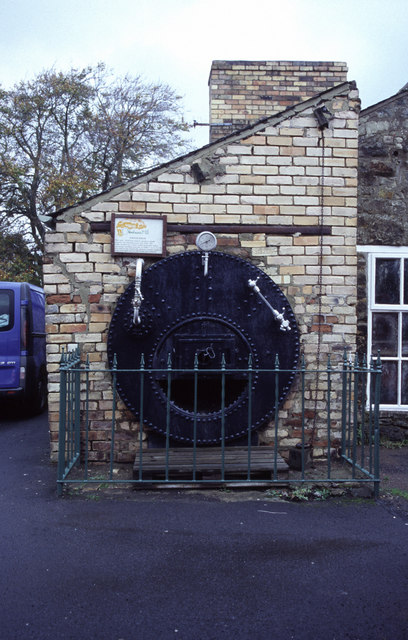
A Cornish boiler provided hot water and steam for the washing and finishing process.

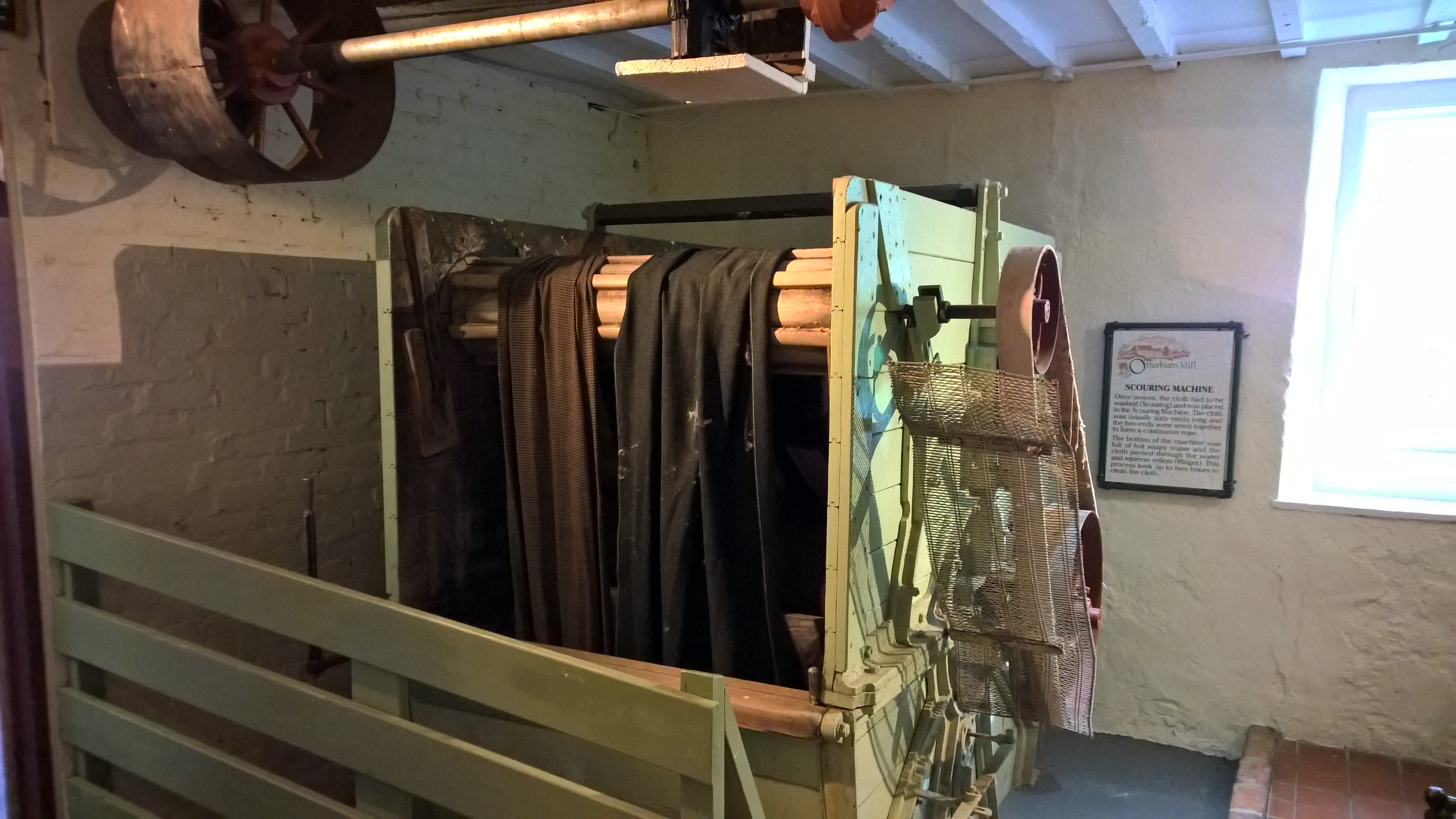
Scouring (washing) machine

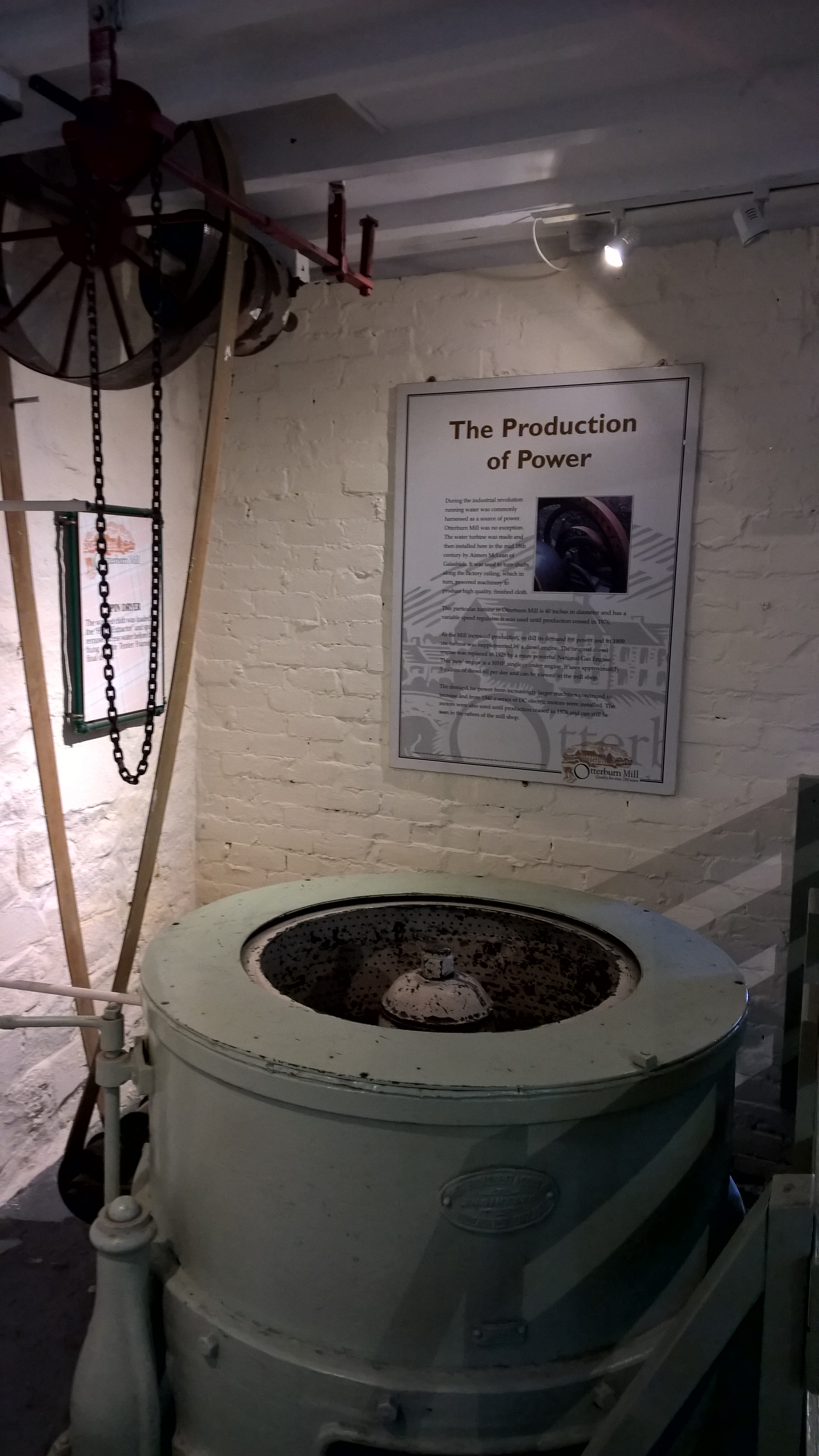
Spin dryer

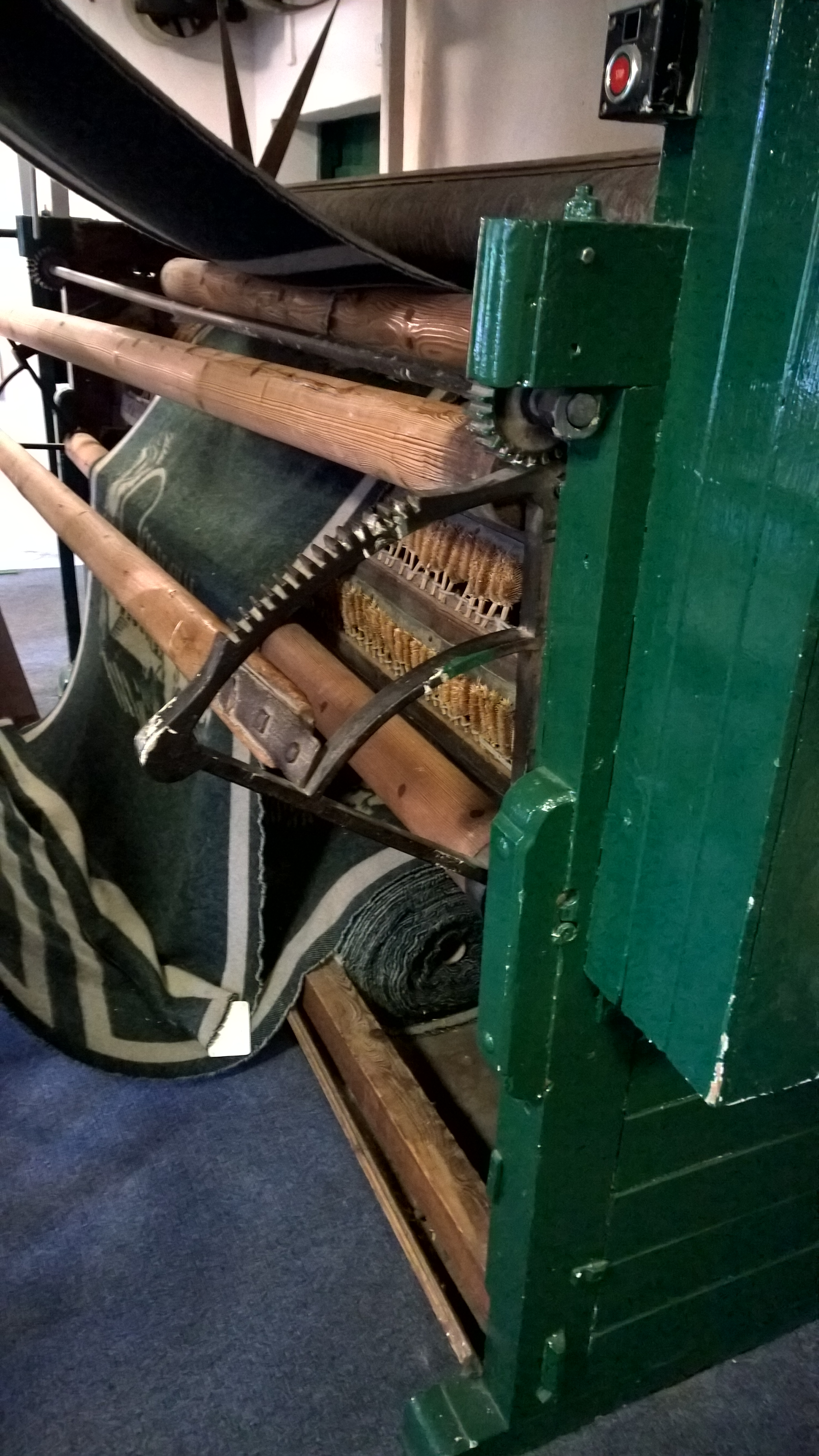
Teazle gig (used to raise the surface of the finished cloth to make it fluffy)

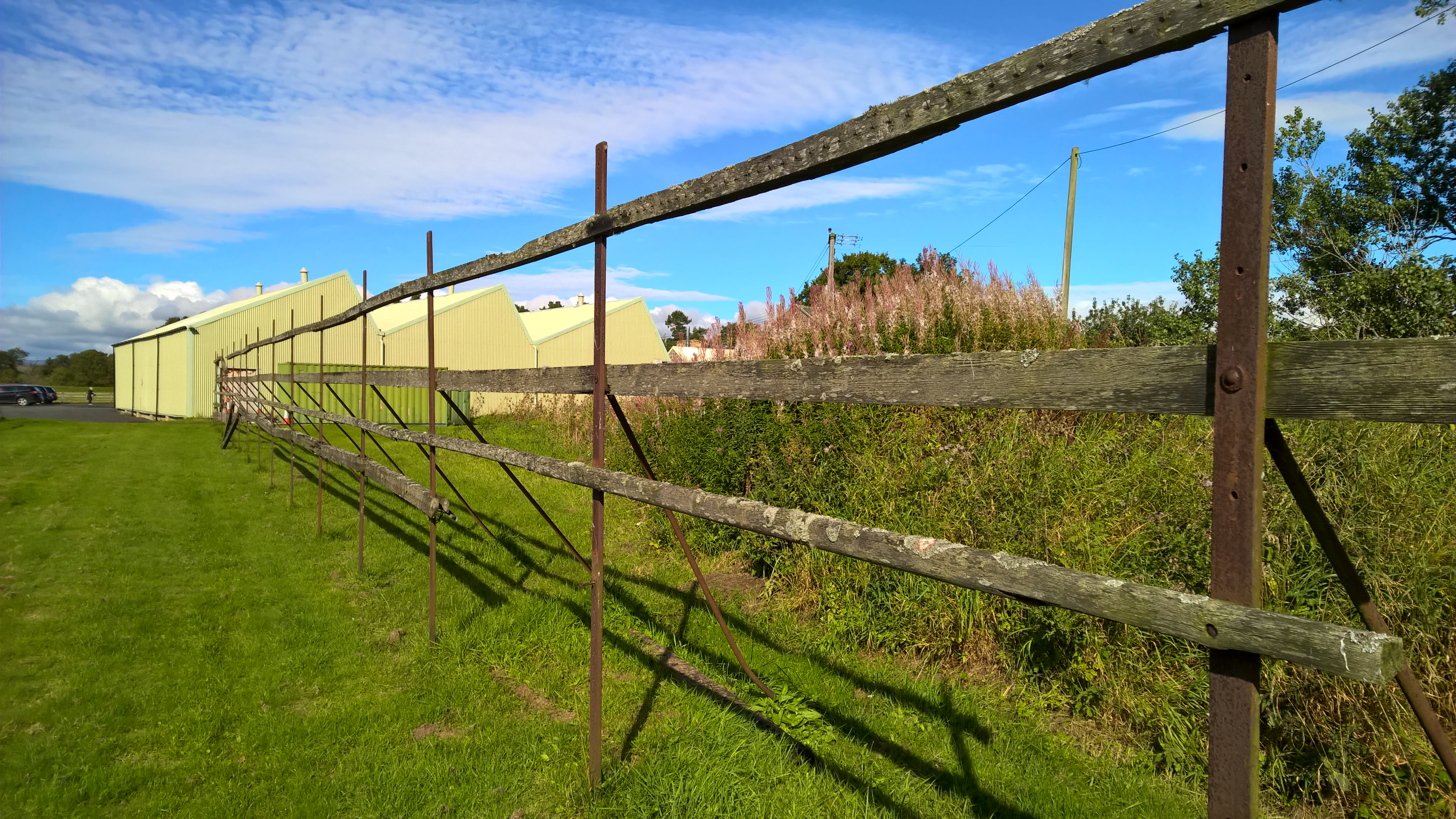
Early 18th-century tenter frame

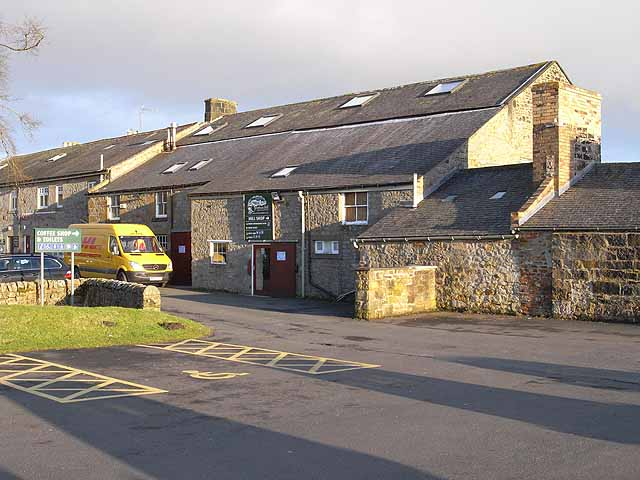
Otterburn Mill coffee shop
