= Mad Jack Hall =

English Jacobite leader (1672–1716)

'Mad' Jack Hall (John Hall; also known as Crazy Jack Hall) (1672 – 13 July 1716) was an English Jacobite leader and property owner and a Justice of Peace in Northumberland. He was a member of Clan Hall, a Border Reiver clan of Norman descent and owned the Otterburn Tower in Redesdale, Northumberland; his initials are still carved over a doorway today.

== Early life and background ==
He was born John Hall, probably at Otterburn Tower, in 1672. His father, John Hall, was born in 1624 and died in 1692. John "Mad Jack" Hall's wife was Alderman Hutchison's daughter, Mary. They were married in Newcastle. Hall had served many years as a Justice of Peace in Northumberland.

== Rebellion and execution ==
He was a major figure during the Jacobite rising of 1715.

He was taken into captivity in Preston and was reportedly reprieved at least five times before being executed. While awaiting trial in prison, Hall remarked to a fellow prisoner "Our fathers gained land in Cromwell's time as sequestrators of rebels, now we are going to lose them for being rebels." He was beheaded at Tyburn for high treason on 13 July 1716.

He was described as a "violent, passionate and indiscreet man" but who was highly generous and beloved by his men. It was his fiery and energetic temper which procured him the name of "Mad Jack Hall of Otterburn".
