= Elsdon, Northumberland =

Village in Northumberland, England

Coordinates: 55.232°N 2.101°W

Elsdon
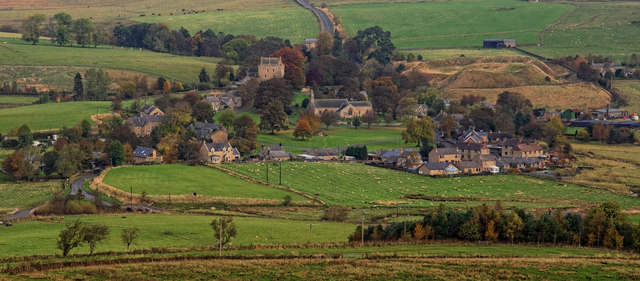
- View of Elsdon village

- Location within Northumberland
- Population: 258 (Local knowledge. 242, 2011 census)
- OS grid reference: NY936932
- Unitary authority: Northumberland
- Ceremonial county: Northumberland
- Region: North East
- Country: England
- Sovereign state: United Kingdom
- Post town: NEWCASTLE UPON TYNE
- Postcode district: NE19
- Dialling code: 01830
- Police: Northumbria
- Fire: Northumberland
- Ambulance: North East
- UK Parliament: North Northumberland

Elsdon is a village and civil parish in the English county of Northumberland about 10 miles (16 km) to the southwest of Rothbury. The name is derived from the Old English meaning Elli's valley.

Formerly the capital of Redesdale, Elsdon contains a very fine example of a Motte and Bailey Castle, and a near perfect Pele Tower (fortified house of a type found in the border country) which is a private residence.

Geographically, Elsdon lies in Redesdale and, as a market town, was once the primary settlement in the area.

== History ==
Elsdon has a gibbet on the hill known as Steng Cross. This gallows has no connection with the border raiders. The present gibbet stands on the site of one from which the body of William Winter was suspended in chains after he had been hanged at The Westgate in Newcastle. Today it is called Winter's Gibbet. Pieces of the gibbet were once said to be able to cure toothache if rubbed on the gums.

In 1791, a murder of an old woman, Margaret Crozier, took place. The following quote is from Tomlinson's Guide to Northumberland:

Believing her to be rich, one William Winter, a desperate character, but recently returned from transportation, at the instigation, and with the assistance of two female faws [vendors of crockery and tinwork] named Jane and Eleanor Clark, who in their wanderings had experienced the kindness of Margaret Crozier, broke into the lonely Pele on the night of 29th August 1791, and cruelly murdered the poor old woman, loading the ass they had brought with her goods. The day before they had rested and dined in a sheep fold on Whisker-shield Common, which overlooked the Raw, and it was from a description given of them by a shepherd boy, who had seen them and taken particular notice of the number and character of the nails in Winter's shoes, and also the peculiar gully, or butcher's knife with which he divided the food that brought them to justice.

The "shepherd lad" was Robert Hindmarsh of Whisker-shield, aged eleven. He reported the fact that there was a stranger in the vicinity of the murder to the authorities. His witness account led to the apprehension and conviction of William Winter. Much later, Robert Baden-Powell took great interest in Hindmarsh's observational skills and subsequent action, and included Hindmarsh's attention to detail as an example to his new Boy Scout movement. In "Scouting for Boys" (1908) Baden-Powell both compliments Hindmarsh's skills as an exemplar to Scouts, and included an imaginary sketch of the encounter between Winter and Hindmarsh when the "nails in the boots" were counted.

Present on the village green is a pinfold, where stray livestock were kept in years past, pending the payment of a fine by their owners. Also present is the site of an old cockfighting ring and at the north end of the village green is a stone, which once held a ring to which bulls were tied for bull baiting. Between the Motte and Bailey Castle and the Pele tower is some flat land known as the Haugh, where in antiquity, the men of Elsdon practised archery.

== Economy ==
Whilst some new building has been allowed, like many other small villages, Elsdon has suffered for the loss of its shop and Post Office in recent times. There is however still a public house, the Bird in Bush, and a tea room and cafe situated at the Northern end of the village, which is especially popular with cyclists and other visitors.

== Landmarks ==
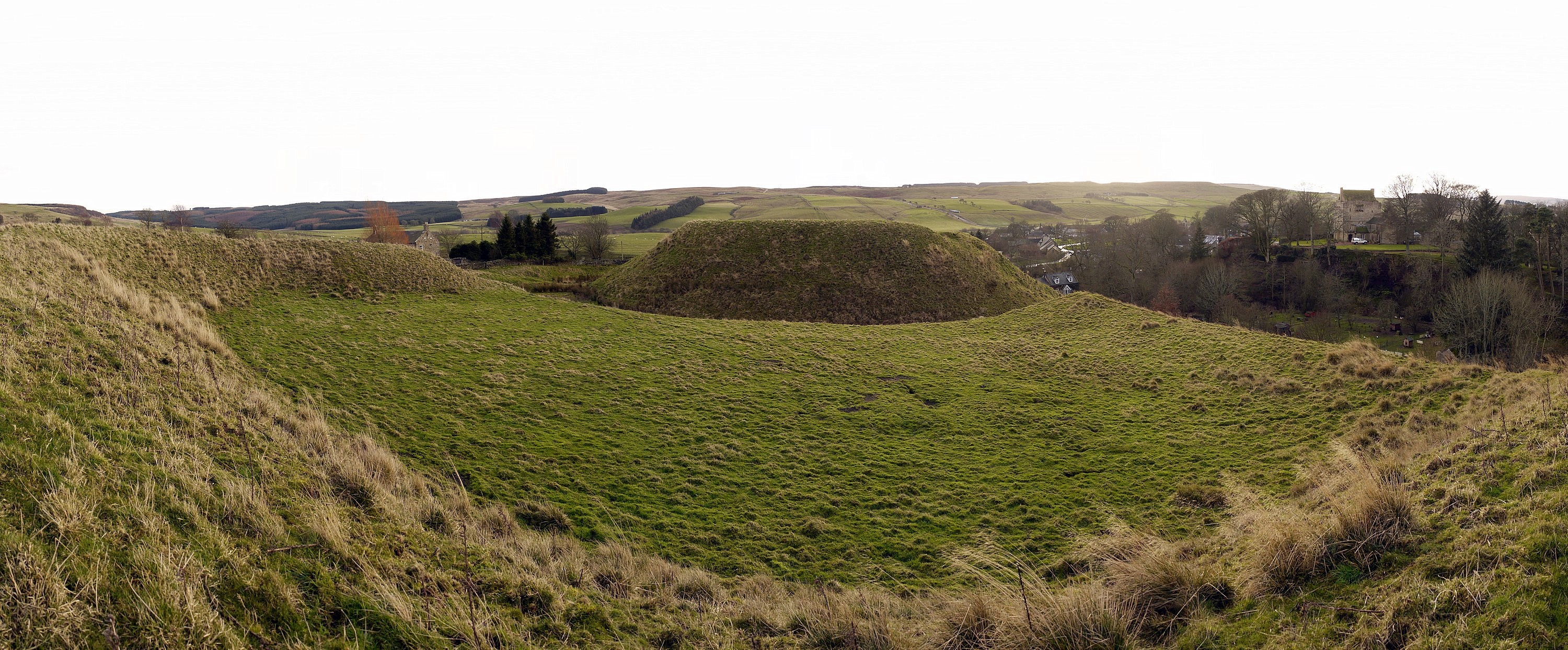
Elsdon Castle, the best preserved medieval motte and bailey castle site in Northumberland

Elsdon Castle was a castle in the village and is a scheduled monument. It is probably the best preserved medieval motte and bailey castle site in Northumberland and was built by Robert de Umfraville, not long after the Norman Conquest. Impressive earthworks remain.

Elsdon Tower is a medieval tower house converted for use as a Rectory and is a Grade I listed building. The property was first recorded in the occupation of the Rector of Elsdon in 1415.

The tower was reduced in the 17th century to three stories with a steeply sloping roof above a castellated parapet In the early 19th century Archdeacon Singleton built an entrance porch and a two-storey, two bayed house extension.

== Religious sites ==
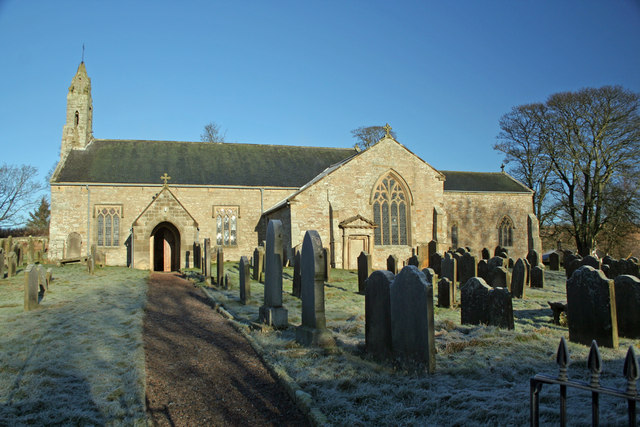
St Cuthbert's Church, the bodies from the 1388 Battle of Otterburn are believed to have been buried at the church

Close to the fortified vicarage is Elsdon's church which claims to have been a resting place for St. Cuthbert's body and is one of the many dedicated to his memory. Of much historical interest, it is also larger than many Northumbrian churches. In the nineteenth century when alterations were taking place, a large number of skeletons were discovered which appeared to have been buried in a communal grave, an indication that the bodies had been buried at Elsdon after the Battle of Otterburn.

== See also ==
- Elsdon Castle
- Elsdon Tower
- Benshaw Moor
- Billsmoor Park and Grasslees Wood SSSI
