= Byrness =

Village in Northumberland, England

Coordinates: 55.318°N 2.371°W

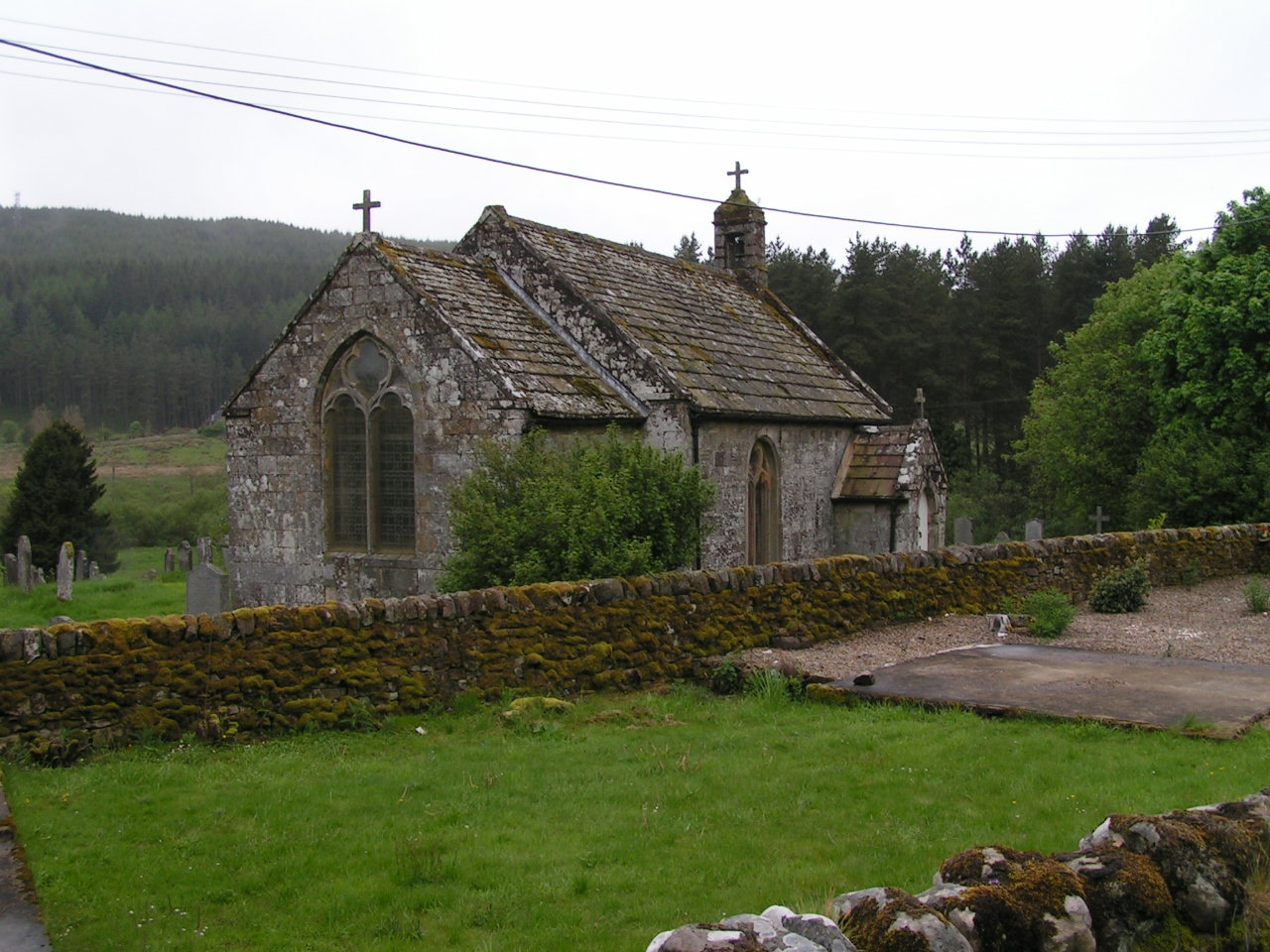
- Byrness Church

- Location within Northumberland
- OS grid reference: NT770023
- Civil parish: Rochester
- Unitary authority: Northumberland
- Ceremonial county: Northumberland
- Region: North East
- Country: England
- Sovereign state: United Kingdom
- Post town: NEWCASTLE UPON TYNE
- Postcode district: NE19
- Dialling code: 01830
- Police: Northumbria
- Fire: Northumberland
- Ambulance: North East
- UK Parliament: Hexham

Byrness is a village within Rochester civil parish in Northumberland, England. It is approximately 37 miles (60 km) north-west of Newcastle upon Tyne on the A68, and is the last village in England before the A68 climbs the Cheviot Hills to cross Carter Bar into Scotland. Byrness's village church features a stained-glass window commemorating the workers who died during the building of Catcleugh Reservoir nearby. Much of the village was built by the Forestry Commission to house workers for the extensive forests that surround it. Situated on the Pennine Way, Byrness has an inn (Forest View), campsite and other accommodation offering rest and sustenance for weary walkers.

== History ==
In the 17th century Byrness was located in the shieling grounds of the upper Rede valley and there is little or no evidence of permanent post-medieval habitation. By the latter part of the 18th century, Hodgson reported that there was a burial ground in the area and the sale of the Lordship by the Howards had resulted in the construction of some farms in the area, such as Catcleugh and Byrness.

The first real evidence of attempts to create a permanent centre of settlement in this part of upper Redesdale came in the 1790s with the erection of the Church of St Francis and also a school by the Rector of Elsdon, the Rev. Louis Dutens. The school was only built to house twelve children and gives some indication of the small size of the surrounding agricultural population.

This population remained fairly stable throughout the 19th century, but was obviously given a huge increase with the construction of Catcleugh Reservoir and the introduction of several hundred workers and their families into this remote rural location. The village for the workers constructed by the water company supplied many of the workers' needs. However, aspects of the building operations, such as the narrow-gauge railway to Woodburn and the Saturday market held for the dam workers by local tradesmen, were of direct benefit to the local people.

When the dam was completed, a small number of workers remained to manage the reservoir, but the next influx new people did not take place until the 1930s. In an effort to assist the long-term unemployed, a number of labour camps to provide industrial training were opened throughout Britain. One of these was built at Byrness as a summer extension camp for the facility at Kielder in North Tynedale and operated as a training centre from 1934 until the Second World War, when it was closed down.

It is known that workers from this camp assisted with forestry work as there was clearly a requirement for workers as parts of upper Redesdale was planted. After the war, this work was undertaken by forestry staff who were provided with a purpose-built village just north of the church at Byrness.

Dr Thomas Sharp, a highly regarded expert in local authority housing, designed the houses, which are similar to the ones built at Kielder and Stonehaugh. The village has now been sold off to private home-owners as working practices in the forestry industry no longer necessitate a permanent, resident work force. At the same time the school which became housed in a modern building close to the village is now closed and unused, while the old school is now a private house. The former Byrness farmhouse is now a hotel.

== Wildlife ==
Species encountered in the Byrness area include roe deer, badger, fox and the endangered red squirrel. The forest and hills in the area are also home to a variety of birds of prey including eagles, hawks and owls. During the summer months it is common to see an adder or the common lizard.
