= Otterburn, Northumberland =

Village in Northumberland, England

Coordinates: 55.236°N 2.182°W

Otterburn
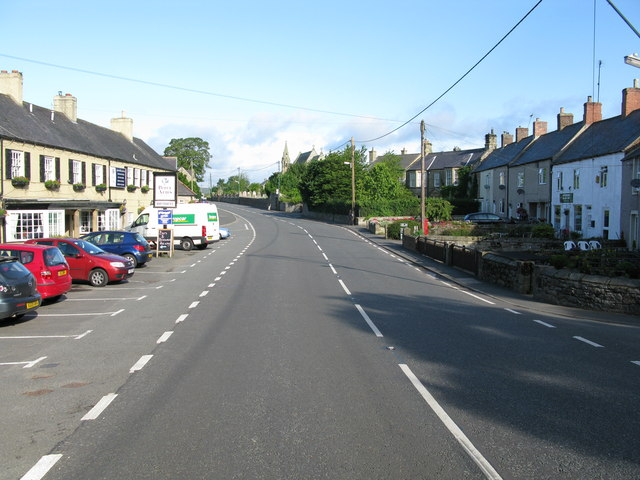
- Otterburn

- Location within Northumberland
- Population: 654 (2011)
- OS grid reference: NY885935
- Civil parish: Otterburn
- Unitary authority: Northumberland
- Ceremonial county: Northumberland
- Region: North East
- Country: England
- Sovereign state: United Kingdom
- Post town: NEWCASTLE UPON TYNE
- Postcode district: NE19
- Dialling code: 01830
- Police: Northumbria
- Fire: Northumberland
- Ambulance: North East
- UK Parliament: Hexham

Otterburn is a village and civil parish in Northumberland, England, 31 miles (50 km) northwest of Newcastle upon Tyne on the banks of the River Rede, near its confluence with the Otter Burn, from which the village derives its name. It lies within the Cheviot Hills about 16 miles (26 km) from the Scottish border. The parish of Otterburn is at the heart of Redesdale, a Northumbrian upland valley. In 2011 the parish had a population of 654.

== Etymology ==
The name Otterburn is first attested in 1217 as Oterburn; it comes from Old English otor 'otter' and brunna 'stream', and thus meant 'otter stream, a stream frequented by otters'.

The district of Otterburn also includes Troughend Common. The origins of this name are uncertain; it may not come from Old English but rather the Brittonic language, with the first part coming from the word that in modern Welsh is tref 'farm' and the second perhaps being gwen 'white'. If so, Troughend once meant 'white farm'.

== History ==
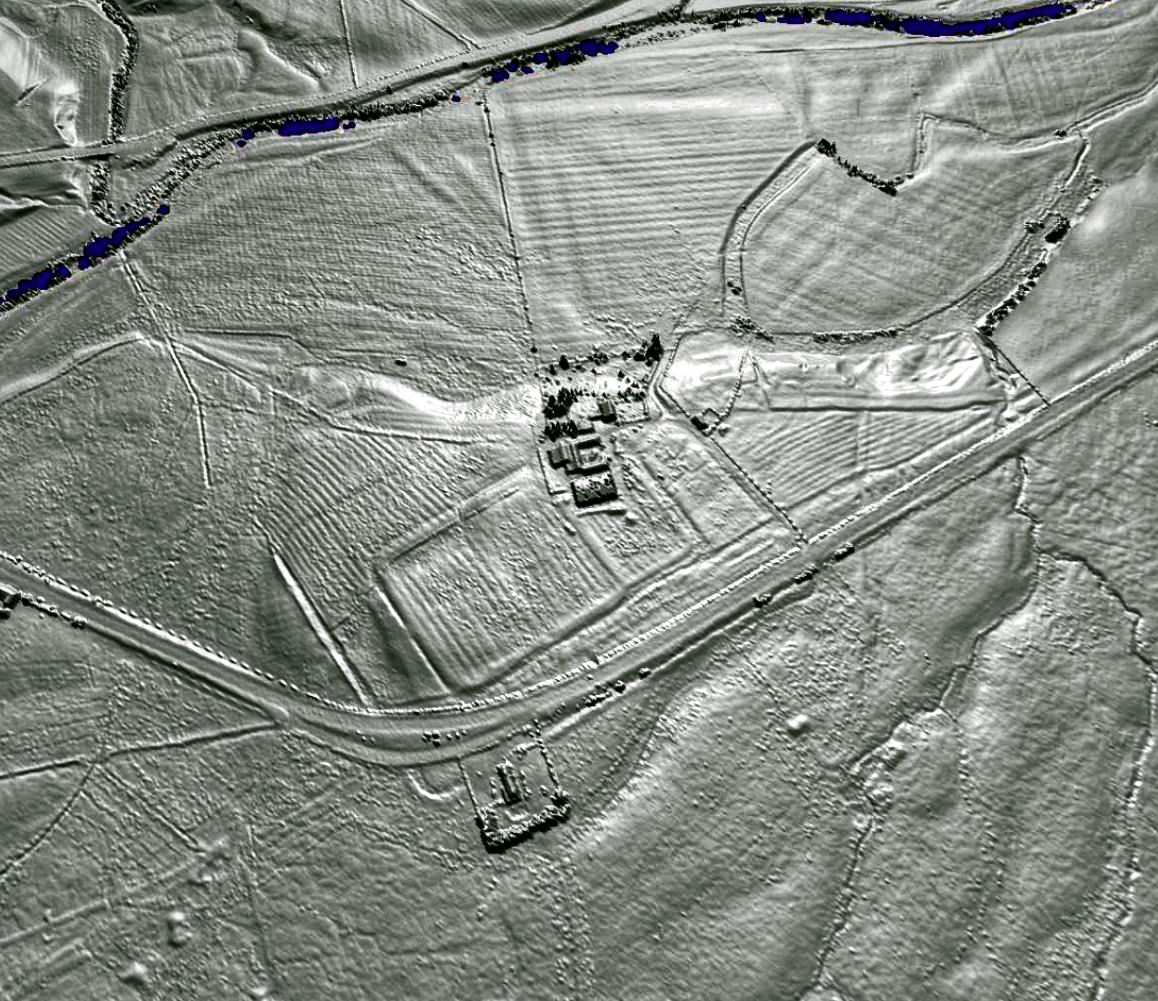
A lidar view of Blakehope Roman fort and camp two miles to the north-west of Otterburn

Otterburn was the site of a major battle in 1388 between English and Scottish armies. The engagement, in which the Scots took Sir Henry Percy captive, is the subject of the English Ballad of Chevy Chase and the Scots ballad Otterburn.

The battle of Otterburn ended in an English rout. Despite James Douglas, 2nd Earl of Douglas being killed, Percy was captured and over a thousand of the English were taken, left dead on the field or slain as they fled. The dead were carried to Elsdon church, 3 miles (4.8 km) from Otterburn, where they were buried.

The modern village grew up around a coaching inn and Otterburn Tower. It was enlarged in the 1950s with the addition of Brierley Gardens, a council estate which was expanded in the 1970s. The village further expanded in the 1990s and 2000s with the new housing development on former farmland at Willow Green.

== Governance ==
Otterburn is in the parliamentary constituency of Hexham. Joe Morris of the Labour Party is the Member of Parliament.

Prior to Brexit, for the European Parliament its residents voted to elect MEP's for the North East England constituency.

For Local Government purposes it belongs to Northumberland County Council a unitary authority.

== Economy ==
Today, the village is close to the Otterburn Training Area, one of the UK's largest army training ranges at approximately 60,000 acres (240 km^{2}). The village also has an independent general grocery shop, two hotels and Otterburn Mill, an 18th-century woollen mill.

== Landmarks ==
- Otterburn Hall, now a hotel, is a Neo-Elizabethan structure, built in 1870 for Lord James Douglas; it is currently shut.
- St John the Evangelist's Church, Otterburn
- Otterburn Mill is now a retail outlet and cafe.
- Otterburn Tower, changed name to Otterburn Castle, now a hotel, was built in 1830 incorporating part of an eighteenth-century house, which itself may have incorporated the thirteenth-century tower house which originally stood on the site.
- The Percy Cross stands within a small plantation, half a mile north of the village. Near this spot, on an August evening in 1388, an English army of 8,000 men followed Sir Henry Percy into the battle of Otterburn against the Scots, led by James Douglas, 2nd Earl of Douglas.
