= Redesdale =

Place in England

- Valley
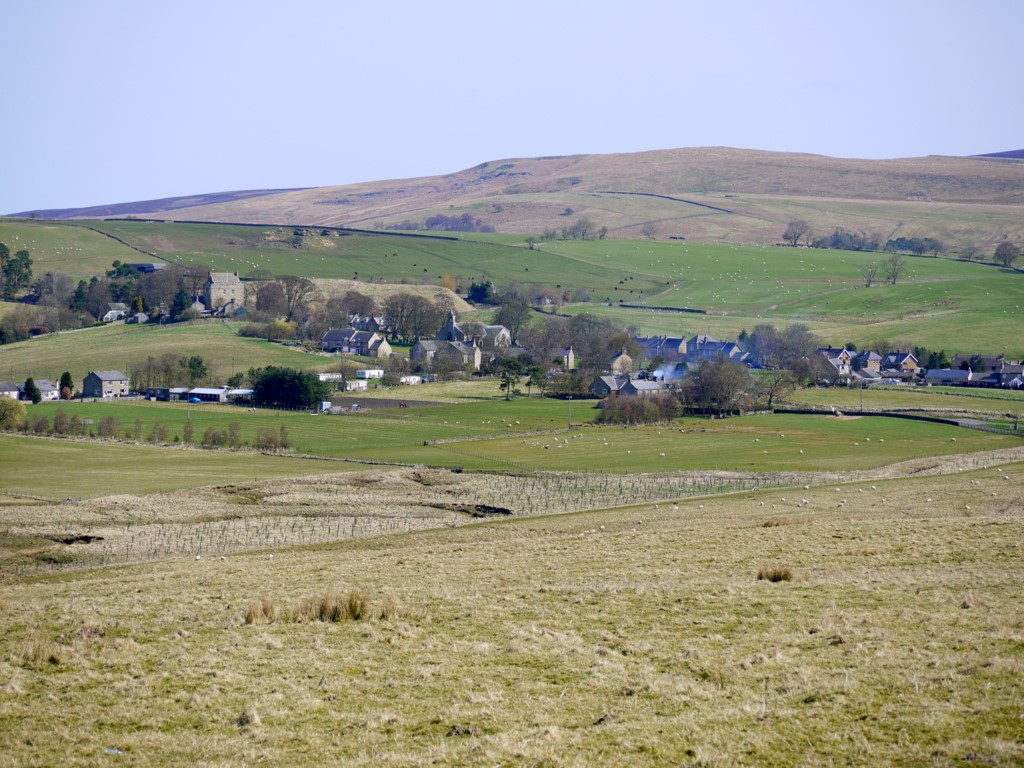
- The village of Elsdon in Redesdale

- Location within Northumberland
- Coordinates: 55.229°N 2.186°W
- Grid position: NY882927
- Location: Northumberland, England

Redesdale is a valley in western Northumberland, England. It is formed by the River Rede, which rises in the Cheviots and flows down to join the North Tyne at Redesmouth. Redesdale is traversed by the A68 trunk road, which enters Scotland via Carter Bar at the head of the valley.

Redesdale contains the settlements of Elsdon, Otterburn, Rochester, and Byrness. Otterburn is the site of a British Army installation, Otterburn Training Area. A portion of Redesdale to the west and north of Otterburn forms part of Northumberland National Park and includes the Redesdale Forest, the northernmost part of Kielder Forest.

== History ==
This valley has historically served as an important route into Scotland, and has seen conflict since the time of the Roman Empire. In 197, two Roman forts in Redesdale were attacked and destroyed, but were later rebuilt. In 311, two Roman forts in Redesdale were again attacked and destroyed by the Picts and subsequently abandoned

After the Norman Conquest of 1066, the Norman noble family Umfraville gained lands in the area and were the first Lords of Redesdale.

In 1388, Otterburn was the site of a historic battle between armies from the kingdoms of England and Scotland, largely fought by moonlight. The Raid of the Redeswire, the last major battle between England and Scotland, took place at the head of the valley in 1575.

During the Middle Ages, Elsdon was the economic centre of the area: it served as the market town and as the gathering place for the local graynes (extended Border families). In modern times, the village of Otterburn now holds that distinction.

The British crown created the title Baron Redesdale in the 19th century.

== See also ==
- Baron Redesdale

== Sources ==
- Grundy, John (2022). History of Northumberland. Newcastle upon Tyne: Tyne Bridge Publishing. ISBN 9781838280970.
