= St John the Evangelist's Church, Otterburn =

St John the Evanglist’s Church, Otterburn
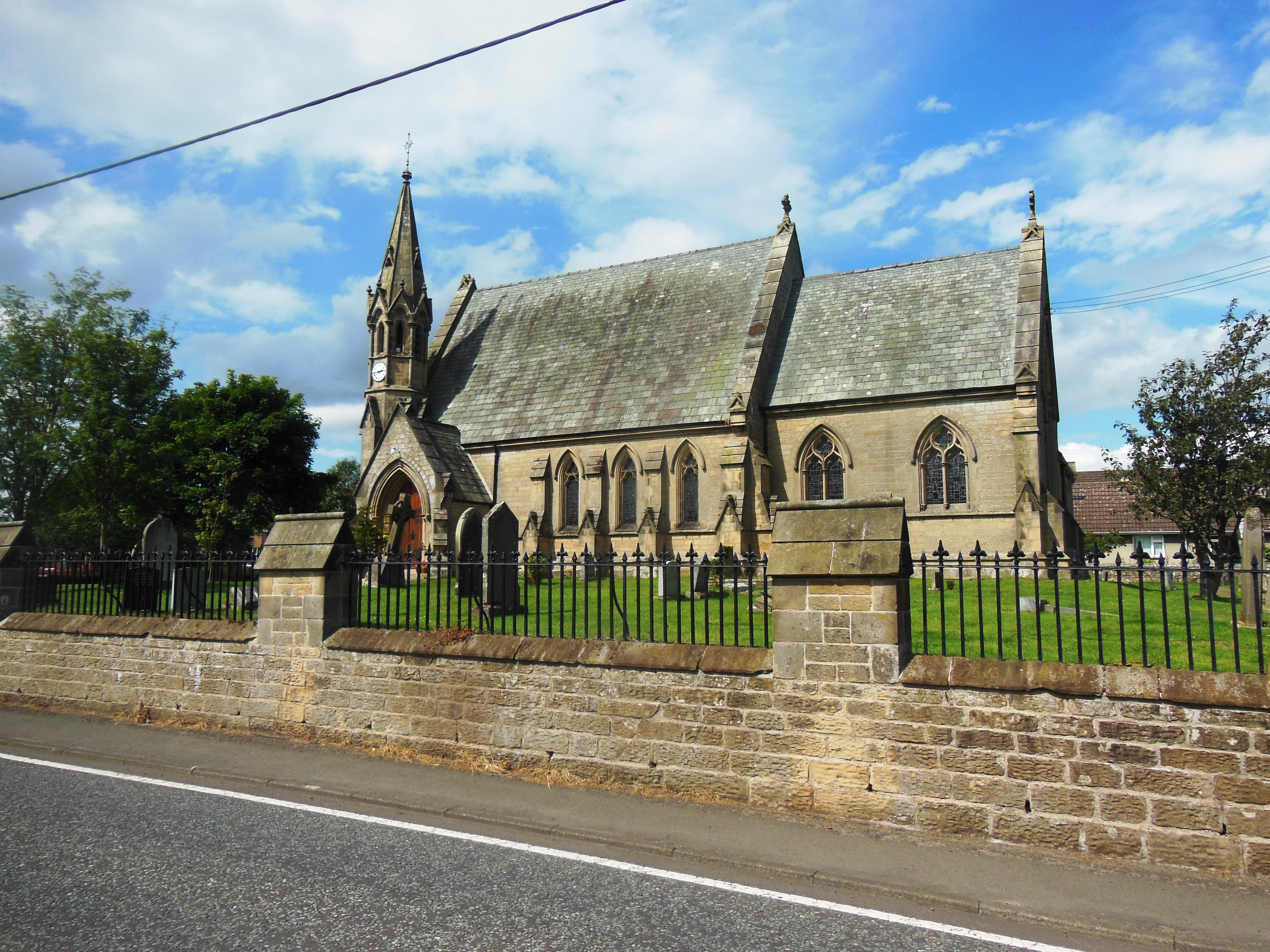
- St John the Evanglist’s Church, Otterburn
- St John the Evanglist’s Church, Otterburn
- 55°13′56.41″N 2°10′53.67″W
- OS grid reference: NY 88543 93130
- Location: Otterburn, Northumberland
- Country: England
- Denomination: Church of England

History
- Dedication: St John the Evangelist
- Dedicated: 27 October 1857

Architecture
- Heritage designation: Grade II listed
- Architect: John Dobson
- Groundbreaking: 28 September 1855

Administration
- Diocese: Diocese of Newcastle
- Archdeaconry: Lindisfarne
- Deanery: Bellingham
- Parish: North Tyne and Redesdale Team

St John the Evangelist's Church is a church in Otterburn, Northumberland, northeast England, located off the A696 road.

== History ==
The foundation stone of Otterburn Church was laid on 28 September 1855 and it was dedicated by the Lord Bishop of Durham, Rt. Revd. Edward Maltby on 27 October 1857. Three sisters, the Misses Davidson, of Lemmington Hall, and Mrs. Askew, of Pallinsburn, built Otterburn Church, in the year 1857, for the use of their tenantry and the neighbourhood. They endowed it with £100 per annum. The architect was John Dobson.

== Organ ==
The church had a two manual pipe organ by Nicholson and Newbegin dating from 1910. A specification of the organ can be found on the National Pipe Organ Register.

== Listing ==
The church is a Grade II listed building.

== See also ==
Media related to St John The Evangelist's Church, Otterburn at Wikimedia Commons
