= Battle of Otterburn =

1388 battle of the Anglo-Scottish Wars

- Part of the Anglo-Scottish Wars
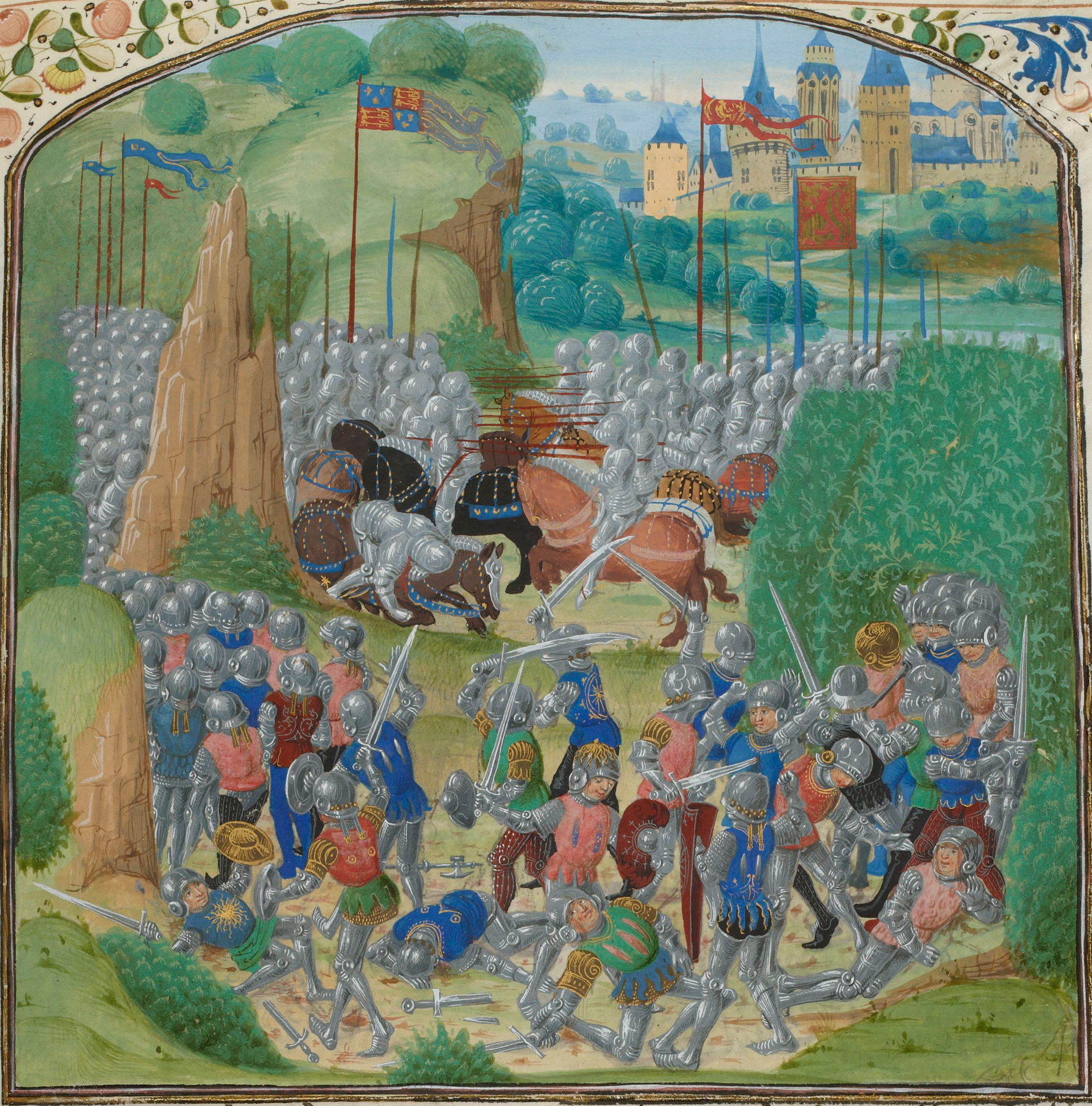
- Battle of Otterburn, Froissart's Chronicles
Date	5 August or 19 August 1388
Location	1 mile north-west of Otterburn, Northumberland 55°14′13″N 02°11′41″W
Result	Scottish victory

Belligerents
Kingdom of England	Kingdom of Scotland

Commanders and leaders
Sir Henry Percy (POW)	Sir James Douglas †

Strength
Up to 8,000	Up to 6,000

Casualties and losses
2,800+ killed or captured	100 or 500

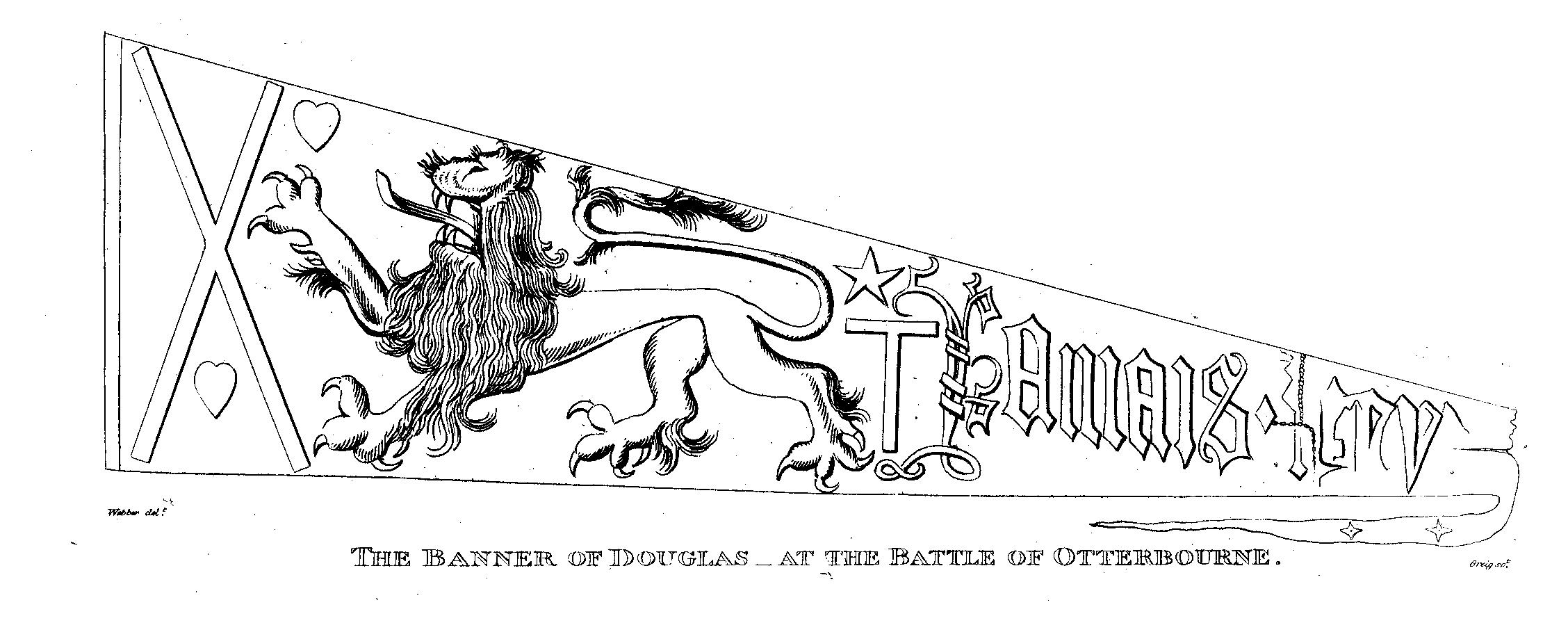
Pennon of James Douglas, Earl of Douglas

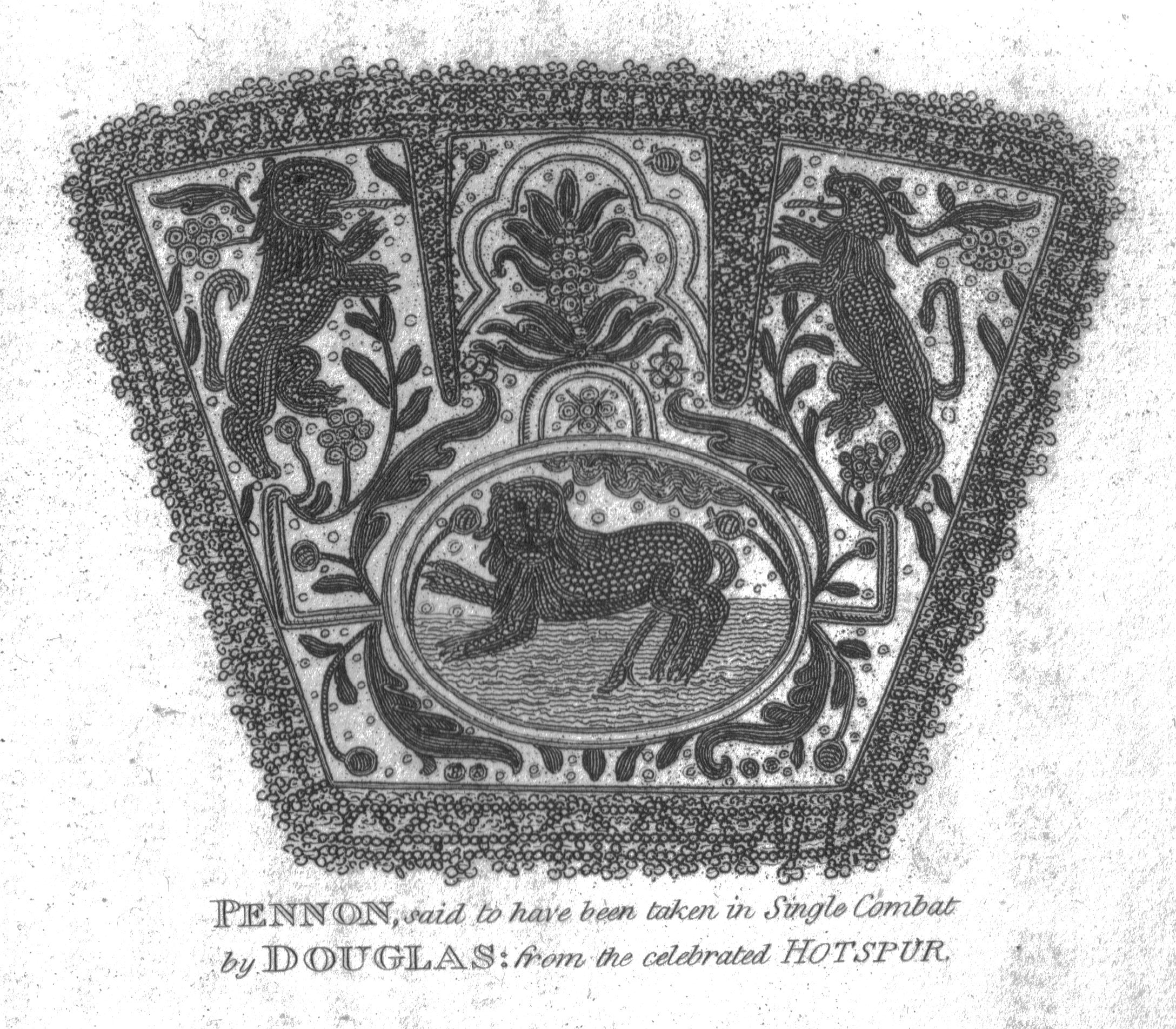
Captured pennon of Hotspur

The Battle of Otterburn, also known as the Battle of Chevy Chase, took place according to Scottish sources on 5 August 1388, or 19 August according to English sources, as part of the continuing border skirmishes between the Scots and English.

The Scottish nobles James, 2nd Earl of Douglas and John Dunbar, Earl of Moray led their army toward Durham while Archibald Douglas, 3rd Earl of Douglas at the time Lord of Galloway, and Robert Stewart, Duke of Albany, at the time Earl of Fife, coordinated a simultaneous attack on Carlisle Castle. It was timed to take advantage of divisions on the English side between Ralph Neville, 1st Earl of Westmorland and Henry Percy, 1st Earl of Northumberland who had just taken over defence of the border and partly in revenge for King Richard II's invasion of Scotland three years previously.

== Battle ==
The Scots fielded two armies, with Archibald Douglas's force and their baggage train heading to attack Carlisle, while another force under the Earl of Douglas and Earl of Moray ravaged the countryside around Durham and Newcastle. Northumberland sent his two sons Harry Hotspur and Sir Ralph Percy to engage while he stayed at Alnwick to cut off the Scottish retreat.

Froissart says that the first fighting included a meeting of the Earl of Douglas and Henry Percy in hand-to-hand combat, in which Percy's pennon was captured. The Earl of Douglas then moved off, destroying the castle at Ponteland and besieging Otterburn Castle (now Otterburn Tower). Percy made a surprise attack on Douglas's encampment in the late afternoon, but first encountered the Earl's serving men, giving the bulk of the forces time to muster and attack them on their flank.

James Douglas led the left wing, while Dunbar led the right. Hotspur's men, having ridden up from Newcastle, were tired and disorganized as they made their way onto the field. Hotspur was so overly confident that he attacked the Scots while the rest of his force was still marching up through Otterburn.

During the battle on a moonlit night Douglas was killed; his death had no influence on the outcome of the battle and went unnoticed until much later. The Percys were both captured. Sir John Montgomery, 9th of Eaglesham, captured Henry Percy (later using the ransom to build Polnoon Castle) with the remaining English force retreating to Newcastle. Despite Percy's force having an estimated three to one advantage over the Scots, Froissart records 1,040 English were captured and 1,860 killed whereas 200 Scots were captured and 100 were killed. The Westminster Chronicle estimates Scottish casualties at around 500.

Some have suggested that Hotspur's rashness and eagerness to engage the Scots and the added tiredness of the English army after its long march north, were the reasons for the English defeat, despite having a three to one advantage in numbers. It is possible that the reasons for this defeat may have been more complex, however.

== Aftermath ==
Such a decisive victory kept the two sides apart for some time. Of such renown was the battle of Otterburn that several ballads were composed in its honour including The Battle of Otterburn and The Ballad of Chevy Chase (Child ballads 161 and 162). Chevy Chase rather mangles the history of the battle and may be confusing other conflicts at around the same time but it is still cited as one of the best of the ancient ballads.

The Percy Cross, located just off the A696, was erected before 1400 to commemorate the Battle of Otterburn.

== Houses involved in the battle ==
Some of the various Scottish Lowland families involved in this battle were the Clan Hall Swintons, Johnstones, Grahams, Gordons, Lindsays, Leslies, Herons and Montgomerys.

Among the English knights cited in Froissart's Chronicles, representing their respective houses in battle, were the commanding brothers Sir Ralph and Harry Hotspur of House Percy, Sir Ralph Lumley, Sir Matthew Redman, Sir Robert Ogle, Sir Thomas Grey, Sir Thomas Holton, Sir John Felton, Sir Thomas Abingdon, Sir John Copeldyke and Sir John Lilburn.
