= Carter Bar =

Crossing-point on the border between Scotland and England

- Pass
- Location in the United Kingdom
- Coordinates: 55°21′16″N 02°28′39″W
- Grid position: NT697068
- Location: United Kingdom
- Elevation: 418 metres (1,371 ft)

Carter Bar is a pass in the Cheviot Hills, on the Anglo-Scottish border. It lies north-east of Carter Fell at the head of Redesdale, and is crossed by the A68 road as it runs north towards Jedburgh and Teviotdale.

The name "Carter Bar" is relatively modern, and refers to a toll-gate that once stood here. Historically, the pass was known as the Redeswire, from the Scots word swire meaning "col" or "pass". The Redeswire Fray, the last skirmish between England and Scotland, was fought here in 1575.

== History ==
Carter Bar was the location of the "truce days", at which the wardens of the English and Scottish marches would meet to dispense cross-border justice. Truce days were also held at Carlisle and Berwick-upon-Tweed.

In 1575, Carter Bar was the scene of the Raid of the Redeswire, one of the last large-scale battles between the English and the Scots.

In the 19th century a toll road was constructed from Carter Bar to the market town of Hawick, necessitating the building of the Bonchester Bridge over the Rule Water.

== Tourism ==
Carter Bar forms a popular point for tourists to stop and take photographs on the Anglo-Scottish border. There are two marker stones on either side of the A68 for this purpose, the original stone created by local Borders stonemason, Eddie Laub. Upper Redesdale, the Scottish Borders (including Tweeddale), and the Cheviot Hills are all visible from Carter Bar. However, its altitude means snow is possible even in late spring and early autumn, and the Carter Bar pass can be subject to frequent snow-related closures during the winter.

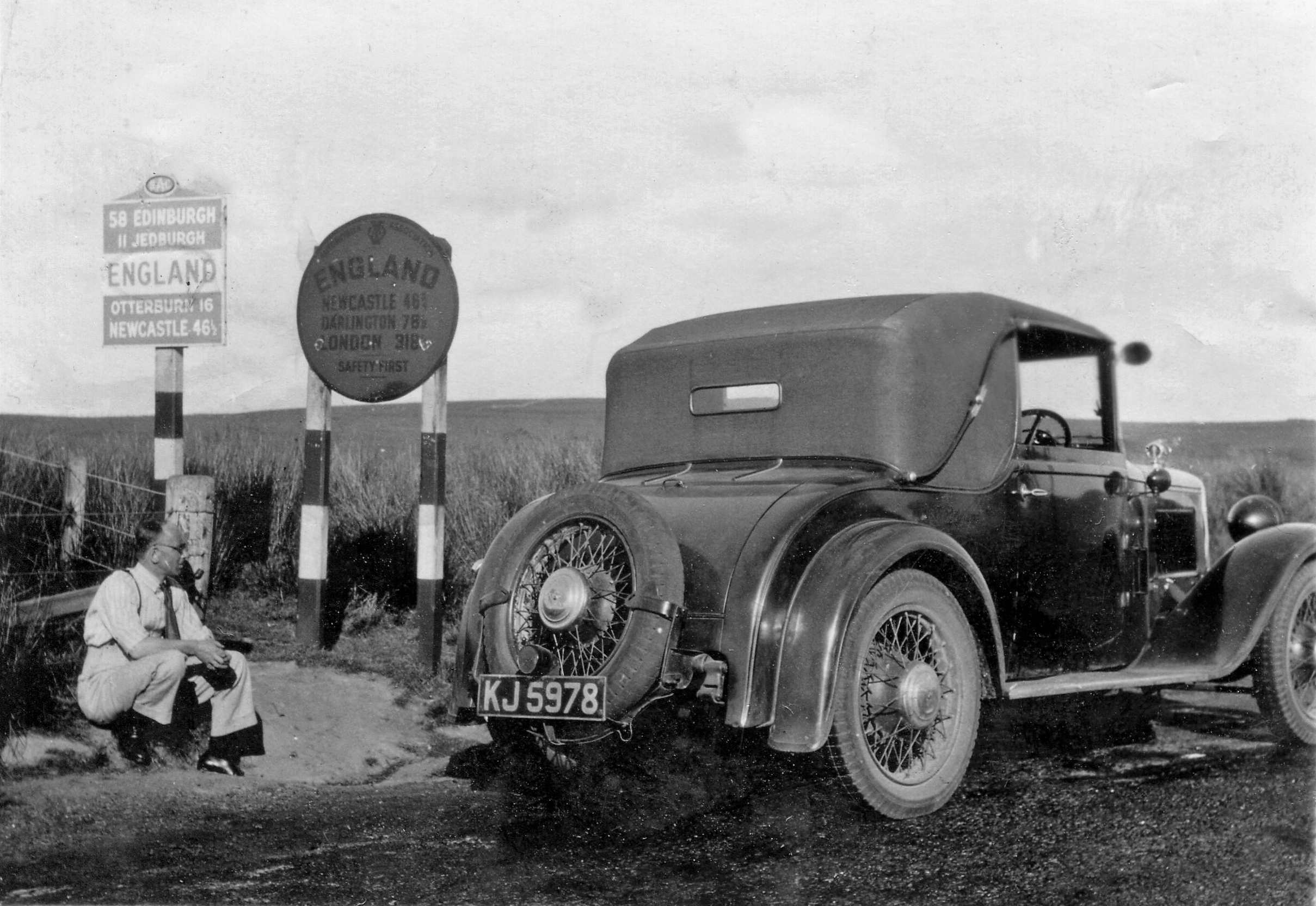
Carter Bar in 1933

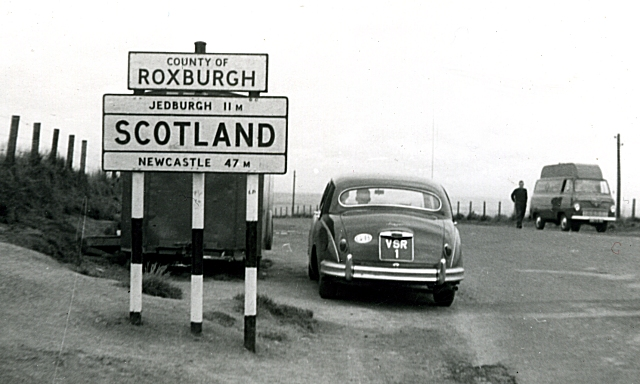
Carter Bar in 1960

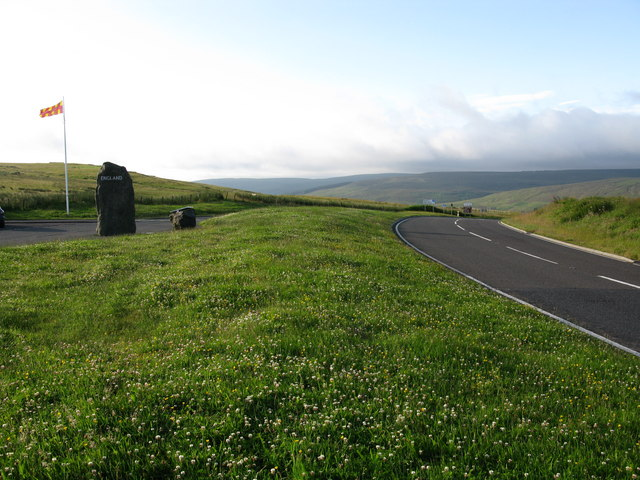
Carter Bar, 2009

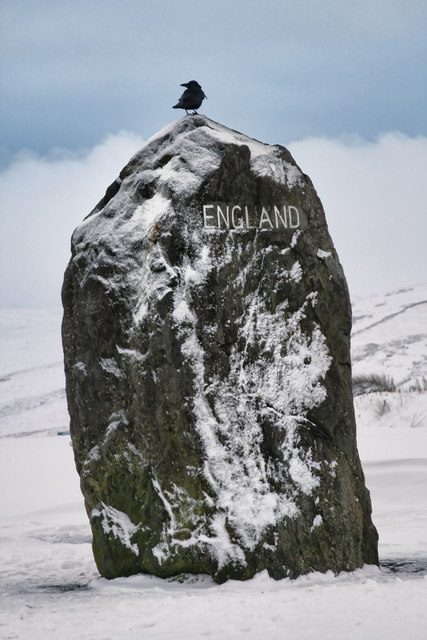
Boundary stone

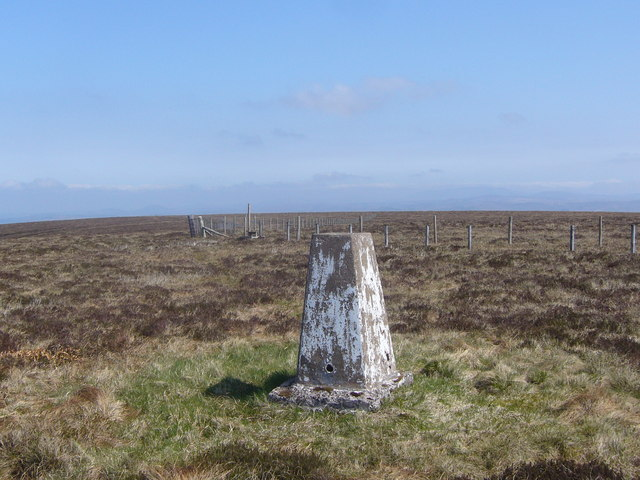
Carter Bar trig stone (Triangulation station)

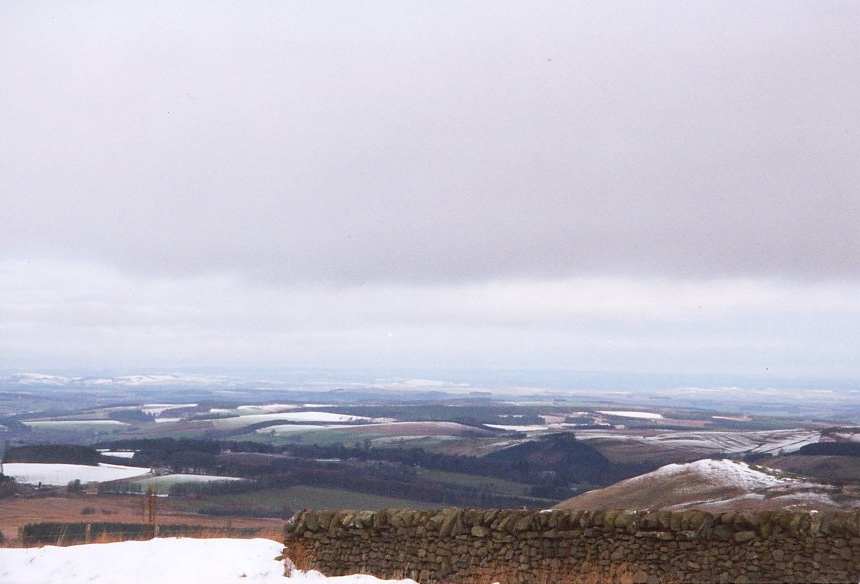
The Scottish Borders from Carter Bar

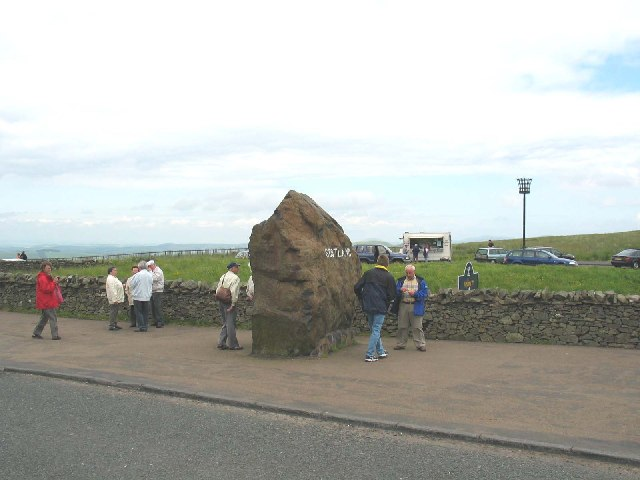
Road viewpoint in 2005

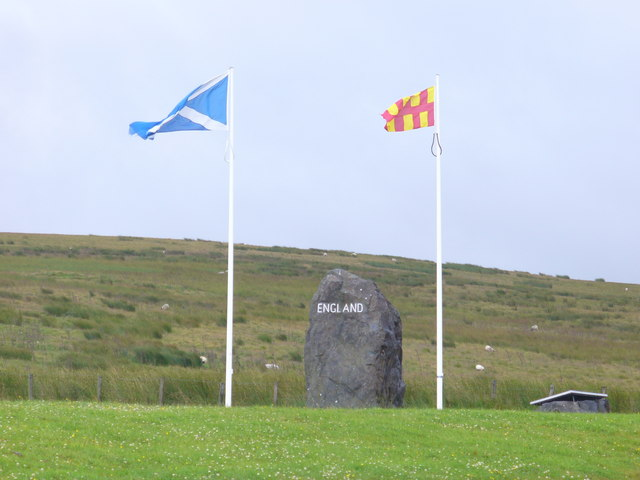
Flags of Scotland and Northumberland

== See also ==
- List of places in the Scottish Borders
- List of places in Northumberland
