= River Rede =

River in Northumberland, England

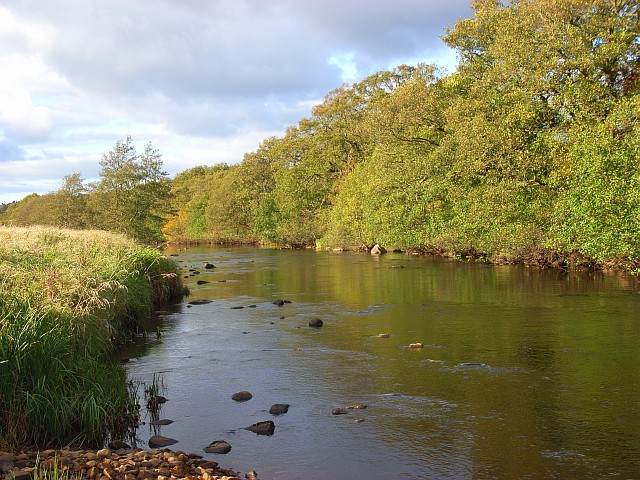
- The River Rede

- Location of the mouth within Northumberland

Location
- Country: United Kingdom
- County: Northumberland

Physical characteristics
- Source
  - coordinates: 55.343°N 2.467°W
- Mouth
  - coordinates: 55.13204°N 2.22147°W
- Length: 32 miles (52 km)

Basin features
- River system: River Tyne

The Rede is a river in Northumberland, England. The river rises on Carter Fell on the Anglo-Scottish border feeding Catcleugh Reservoir and joins the River North Tyne below the village of Redesmouth. The Rede is one of only two rivers in the North East of England that has the freshwater pearl mussel in its waters.

== Course and toponymy ==
The source of the river is on Carter Fell, part of the Whitelee National Nature Reserve. It flows in a south-easterly direction and is the main feeder for the Catcleugh Reservoir which was impounded in 1901 and completed in 1905. It flows south east through Redesdale alongside the A68 road before meeting with the Otter Burn in Otterburn and heading south, before turning west at East and West Woodburn. It then heads south through Redesmouth before emptying into the River North Tyne.

The name of the river derives from the Old English Rēade, meaning the red one. The river lends its name to Redesmouth, the point where the mouth is.

== Catchment and hydrometry ==
The river measures 32 miles (52 km) from source to Redesmouth and drains an area of 60 square miles (156 km^{2}). In the upper reaches, the catchment is mostly upland and is partly in the Kielder Forest Park. In the lower reaches, the landscape changes slightly to grassland and upland heath with underlying boulder clay, alluvium and peat.

== Wildlife ==
The Rede is known for its salmon, trout and otter, which are commonly seen within its waters. The river is notable for being one of the few places in England to have a freshwater pearl mussel population, which in 2006, was estimated at 50,000 mussels across the Rede and the North Tyne. Several projects have been undertaken to help the mussel population including limiting sediment flow in the river and the introduction of freshwater trout into the river. Previously, water that was piped from Catcleugh Reservoir to Whittle Dene Reservoir (at Harlow Hill), was cleaned annual of its harmless sediment, but the waste water was pumped into the Rede. A remedial programme costing £500,000 was implemented in 2019 to stop this from happening.

The use of trout, of which 11,000 were released in 2011, is to help with the pearl mussel's life cycle. The fish were bred at the Kielder hatchery and had microscopic pearl mussel larvae attached to their gills. The programme is hopeful for repopulating parts of the river with new mussels.

== Tributaries ==
The River Rede is the principal tributary of the North Tyne, but the watercourses listed below are the main tributaries of the River Rede

- Bateinghope Burn (r)
- Coomsden Burn (r)
- Ramsden Burn (l)
- Chattlehope Burn (r)
- Cottonshope Burn (l)
- Blakehope Burn (r)
- Bellshiel Burn (l)
- Sills Burn (l)
- Rattenraw Burn (r)
- Durtrees Burn (l)
- Dargues Burn (r)
- Otter Burn (l)
- Raylees Burn (l)
- Miller Burn (r)
- Brigg Burn (r)
- Lisles Burn (l)
- Chesterhope Burn (l)
- Broomhope Burn (l)

== See also ==
- Carter Bar
- List of places in Northumberland
- List of places in the Scottish Borders
- List of places in England
- List of places in Scotland
