= Kielder (disambiguation) =

Kielder a village in Northumberland, England.

Kielder may also refer to a number of locations in Northumberland, England, UK:

- Kielder railway station, in the village
- Kielder Water, a reservoir
- Kielder Viaduct, a rail viaduct over Kielder Water
- Kielder Forest, a tree plantation around Kielder village and Kielder Water
- Kielder Observatory, an astronomical observatory in Kielder Forest
