= Deadwater =

Deadwater(s) or Dead water may refer to:

== Places ==
- Deadwater, Hampshire, village in England
- Deadwater, Northumberland, village in England
  - Deadwater railway station, a closed railway station
- Deadwaters, South Lanarkshire, a village in Scotland; See List of places in South Lanarkshire
- Deadwater Ait, island in the River Thames near Windsor, Berkshire, England

== Other uses ==
- Deadwater (film), horror film
- Deadwater (topography), part of an estuary through which there is little to no water flow
- Dead water, nautical term when a layer of fresh water rests on top of denser salt water, without mixing
- dead water caused by low oxygen levels in aquatic environments
