= Lewiefield Halt railway station =

Former railway station in England

Lewiefield Halt

General information
- Location: Lewie, Kielder, Northumberland; England
- Coordinates: 55.214°N 2.558°W
- Grid reference: NY646913
- Platforms: 1

Other information
- Status: Disused

History
- Post-grouping: London and North Eastern Railway

Key dates
- 3 July 1933: Station opened
- 15 October 1956: Station closed to passengers and freight
Location

Border Counties Railway

Overview
- Status: Closed
- Locale: Roxburghshire, Scotland; Northumberland, England

Service
- Type: Heavy rail

History
- Commenced: 11 December 1855
- Opened: 2 April 1858
- Completed: 24 June 1862
- Merged into: North British Railway - 1860
- Merged into: London North Eastern Railway - 1923
- Merged into: British Railways - 1948
- Closed: 1 September 1958; (except Reedsmouth–Bellingham, closed 11 November 1963)

Technical
- Track gauge: 4 ft 8 1/2 in (1,435 mm)

Lewiefield Halt was a wooden-built halt that served the hamlet of Lewie, and a Ministry of Labour training camp, in Northumberland, England.

== History ==
The halt was on the Border Counties Railway which linked the Newcastle and Carlisle Railway, near Hexham, with the Border Union Railway at Riccarton Junction. The first section of the route was opened between Hexham and Chollerford in 1858, the remainder opening in 1862. The line was closed to passengers by British Railways in 1956. Part of the line is now beneath the surface of Kielder Water.

The halt was constructed primarily to serve a Ministry of Labour training camp built on Forestry Commission land nearby. The halt remained busy during the Second World War when the local camp was used to first house conscientious objectors, then refugees. After the war traffic to the halt was limited and it closed in 1956. Only an overgrown platform remains of the halt today.

Former services

Preceding station	Disused railways	Following station
Kielder	LNER; Border Counties Railway	Plashetts
