= Greystead Bridge =

Stone bridge across the River North Tyne at Greystead in Northumberland

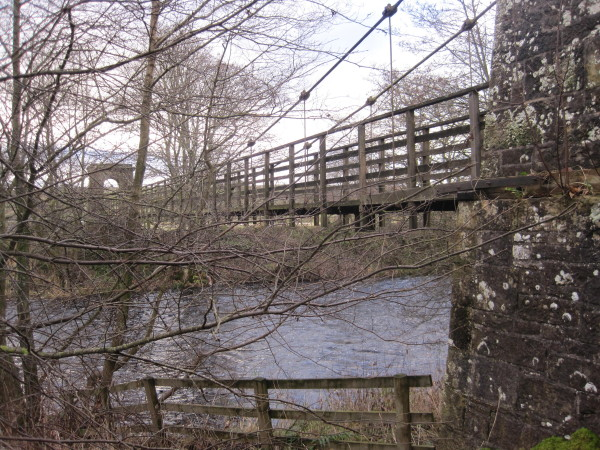
- Coordinates: 55.1690°N 2.3535°W
- OS grid reference: NY777862
- Carries: Pedestrian traffic
- Crosses: River North Tyne
- Locale: Northumberland
- Heritage status: Grade II listed

Characteristics
- Design: Suspension bridge
- Material: Wood
- No. of spans: 1

History
- Construction end: 1862
- Opened: 1862

Greystead Bridge is a wooden suspension pedestrian bridge across the River North Tyne at Greystead in Northumberland, England.

== History ==
The bridge, which has one span, was completed in 1862. It is a Grade II listed structure. It was intended to connect communities on the south bank of the river with Thorneyburn railway station on the north side.

Next bridge upstream	River North Tyne	Next bridge downstream
Falstone Bridge	Greystead Bridge; Grid reference NY777862	Tarset Bridge
