= Gary Fildes =

British astronomer

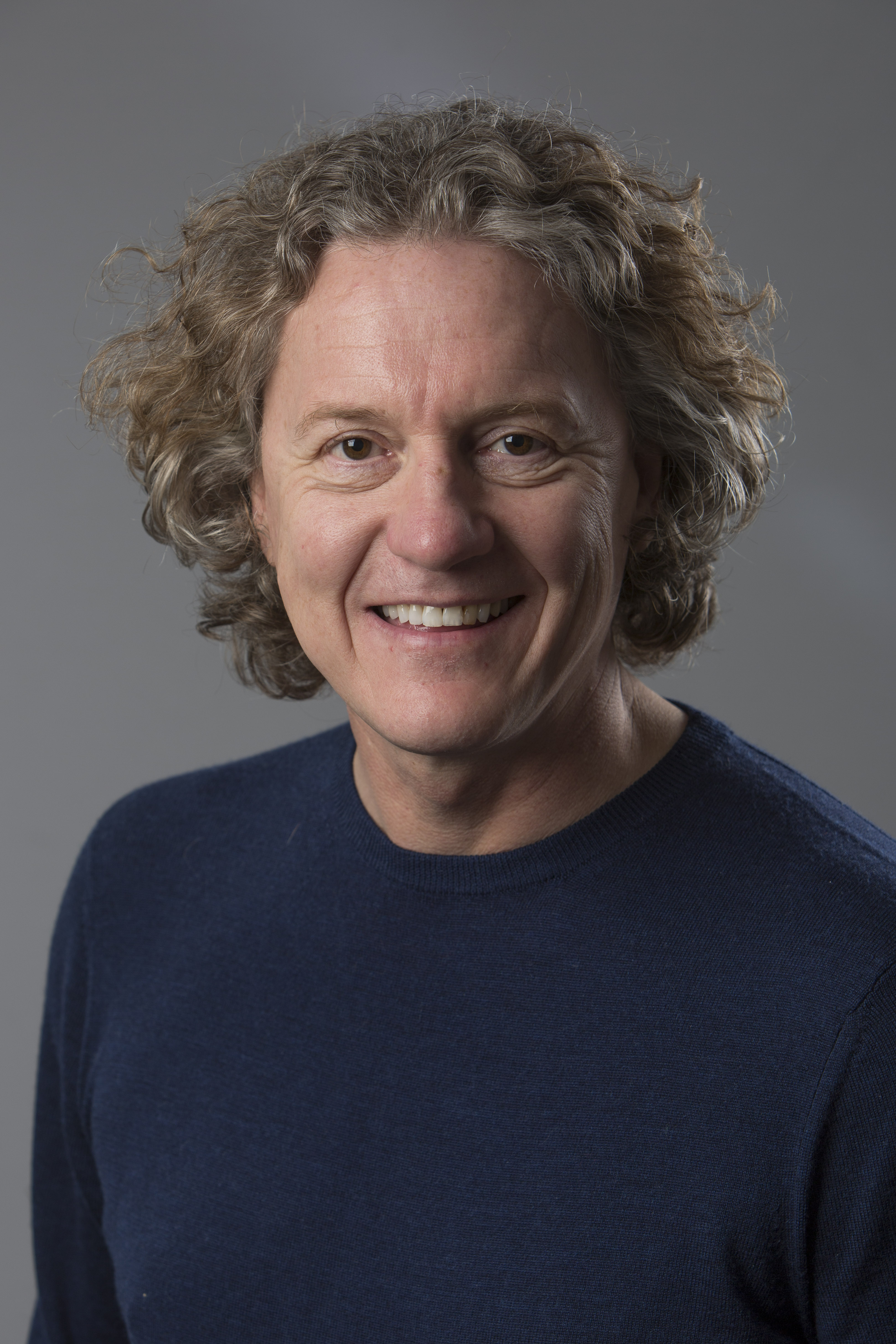
Gary Fildes

Gary Fildes (born 27 September 1965) is an amateur astronomer.

== Early life and education ==
Fildes was born in Sunderland in 1965. Growing up in Grindon, a council estate on the outskirts of Sunderland, he left school at the age of sixteen to work as a bricklayer. Not formally trained in astronomy or academia, in 2012 Fildes was given an honorary master's degree from Durham University.

== Career ==
=== Early career and Sunderland Astronomical Society ===
Fildes worked as a bricklayer in the North East for 25 years. In the late 1990s he joined the Sunderland Astronomical Society and eventually started hosting Kielder Forest Star Camps in the Kielder Forest.

=== Kielder Observatory ===
While running star camps and other astronomy events, Fildes was the lead contributor and driving force in the effort to build an observatory. An open competition ran through the Royal Institute of British Architects, eventually raising £450,000 to construct the observatory. Kielder Observatory was officially opened on 25 April 2008 by Sir Arnold Wolfendale, 14th Astronomer Royal. On 9 December 2013, a 579 square mile (1,500 km^{2}) area, jointly led by Northumberland National Park Authority, Kielder Water and Forest Park Development Trust and Kielder Observatory Astronomical Society, gained Gold Tier Dark Sky Park status from the International Dark-Sky Association, becoming the largest area of protected night sky in Europe.

=== After Kielder ===
Fildes left Kielder Observatory in February 2019. As of 2020, he was working at Grassholme Observatory.

== Awards and honours ==
- Honorary MSc, Durham University, 2012
- Honorary Fellowship, Sunderland University, 2017

== Works ==
=== Non-fiction ===
An Astronomer's Tale (2016)

=== Film and Media ===
Searching for Light documentary (2016)

The Apollo Tribute (2015)
