= HMS Standard =

One ship and one shore establishment of the Royal Navy have borne the name HMS Standard, a term for a war flag:

- HMS Standard (1782) was a 74-gun third rate launched in 1782, used for harbour service from 1799 and broken up in 1816.
- HMS Standard (shore establishment) was a shore establishment at Kielder, Northumberland, commissioned in 1942 and paid off in 1945.
