= Plashetts =

Coordinates: 55.217°N 2.528°W

- Location within Northumberland
- OS grid reference: NY665915
- Civil parish: Falstone
- Unitary authority: Northumberland
- Ceremonial county: Northumberland
- Region: North East
- Country: England
- Sovereign state: United Kingdom
- Post town: HEXHAM
- Postcode district: NE48
- Police: Northumbria
- Fire: Northumberland
- Ambulance: North East
- UK Parliament: Hexham

Plashetts is a small settlement in Northumberland, in England south east of Kielder, Northumberland. It is about 22 miles (35 km) north west of Hexham. Part of the settlement is now beneath the surface of Kielder Water.

== Governance ==
The area is in the parliamentary constituency of Hexham.

== Economy ==
There was a coal mine opened in the 1850s by the Duke of Northumberland. The mine was closed in 1964 by the National Coal Board. Employment was highest in 1914 when 126 men and boys were employed.

== Transport ==
Plashetts was served by Plashetts railway station on the Border Counties Railway which linked the Newcastle and Carlisle Railway, near Hexham, with the Border Union Railway at Riccarton Junction. The first section of the route was opened between Hexham and Chollerford in 1858, the remainder opening in 1862. The line was closed to passengers by British Railways in 1956. Part of the line is now beneath the surface of Kielder Water.

The station had a single platform and very tall signal box. This was a fairly substantial station having a waggonway branch, which ran from here up Slater's incline, to the Plashetts and Far Colliery. To the north of the station were one or two houses and at the end of the waggonway a miners village. The bottom of the incline is now a pier used by the ferryboat service on the lake.

== See also ==
- Kielder Water
- Plashetts Colliery Waggonway at Plashetts
- Awdry, Christopher (1990). Encyclopaedia of British Railway Companies. Sparkford: Patrick Stephens Ltd. ISBN 1-8526-0049-7. OCLC 19514063. CN 8983.
- Butt, R. V. J. (October 1995). The Directory of Railway Stations: details every public and private passenger station, halt, platform and stopping place, past and present (1st ed.). Sparkford: Patrick Stephens Ltd. ISBN 978-1-85260-508-7. OCLC 60251199. OL 11956311M.
