= Kielder Viaduct =

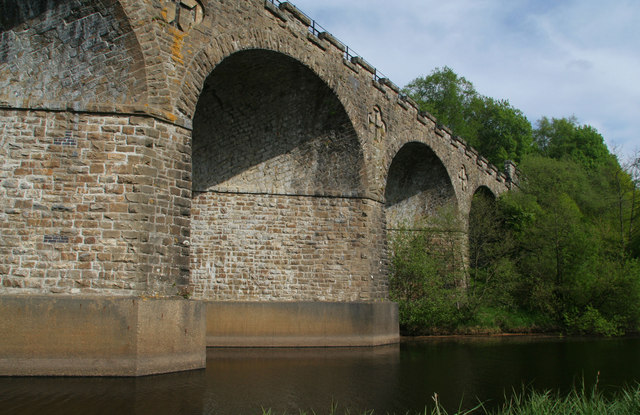
- Kielder skew viaduct, built to carry the Border Counties Railway over Deadwater Burn
- Coordinates: 55.2247°N 2.5799°W
- OS grid reference: NY632924
- Carries: Lakeside Way; Cycles; Pedestrians
- Crosses: Deadwater Burn
- Locale: Northumberland
- Owner: Northumberland & Newcastle Society
- Heritage status: Scheduled monument

Characteristics
- Design: Skew arch viaduct
- Material: Stone
- Total length: 392 ft (119 m)
- Longest span: Seven spans of 40 ft (12 m)
- No. of spans: 7
- Piers in water: 3

History
- Designer: John Furness Tone
- Construction start: 1858
- Construction end: 1862
- Opened: 1862
- Closed: 1 September 1958, as a railway

Location
- Interactive map of Kielder Viaduct

Kielder Viaduct consists of seven semi-circular masonry skew arches and was built in 1862 by the North British Railway to carry the Border Counties Line across marshy land, which following flooding to create Kielder Water, became the place where Deadwater Burn joins Bakethin Reservoir. Now closed to rail traffic, the bridge is currently used as a footpath.

== History ==
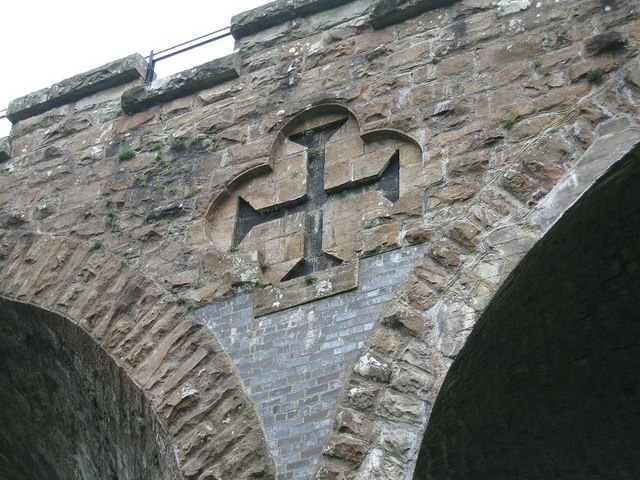
Kielder Viaduct, spandrel detail

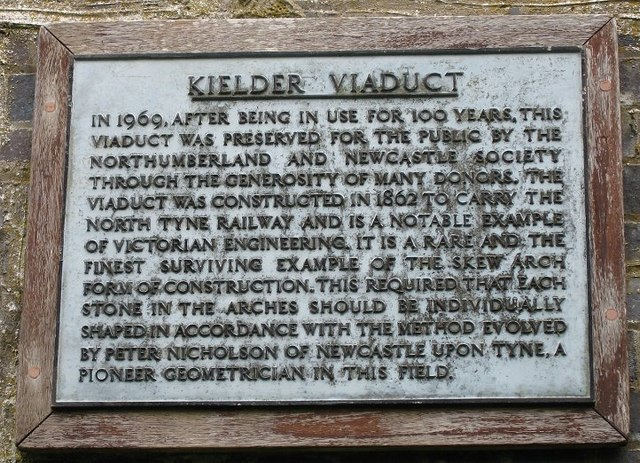
Kielder Viaduct, information plaque

The viaduct was conceived in a joint project of the Border Counties Railway and the North British Railway as part of the former's extension to Riccarton Junction in Scotland. The project was completed in 1862 but the Border Counties Railway had been absorbed by the North British Railway two years earlier. In order to meet with the approval of local landowner the Duke of Northumberland who had a shooting lodge nearby, the viaduct was built in a Baronial style and decorated with a battlemented parapet and faux arrow slits.

Robert Nicholson had been the engineer responsible for building the first section of the line but, on his death in 1855, his nephew John Furness Tone (1822–1881) took on the task of completing the project and it was under his direction that contractors William Hutchinson and John Ridley built the viaduct. The arches are constructed at a skewed angle and the stones are laid along helical courses, according to a set of principles attributed to architect and mathematician Peter Nicholson.

The railway company had hoped to tap the coal traffic from Plashetts colliery that opened nearby in the 1850s but this proved disappointing, although there was some traffic from forestry in the area. Passenger traffic was always limited, though the line did open up the North Tyne valley and was in part responsible for the increase in population there. The North British Railway, therefore, gained its own route between Edinburgh and Newcastle upon Tyne via Hexham but it compared poorly with the route via Berwick, taking almost five hours to complete the journey.

On 1 January 1923 ownership of the viaduct, along with the rest of the line, passed to the London and North Eastern Railway and thence to the North Eastern region of British Railways on nationalisation in 1948. The line through Kielder lost its passenger service on 15 October 1956 and closed completely on 1 September 1958 and the viaduct's future became uncertain when the £167 million Kielder reservoir project was begun in 1976, a substantial part of the route of the old line being lost under the waters. However, steps were taken by the Northumberland and Newcastle Society to protect the viaduct itself by encasing the bases of its piers in concrete and waterproofing the bridge deck.

The structure is now a Scheduled Monument and forms part of a footpath from which walkers can enjoy the views from the top of its arches.

Next crossing upstream	River North Tyne	Next crossing downstream
Butteryhaugh Bridge	Kielder Viaduct; Grid reference NY6321692420	Falstone Bridge
