= HMS Standard (shore establishment) =

Coordinates: 55°12′35″N 2°33′14″W

- Name: HMS Standard
- Acquired: 1941
- Commissioned: 15 January 1942
- Decommissioned: 13 July 1945
- Type: Shore establishment

HMS Standard was a British Royal Navy shore establishment between 1942 and 1945. Situated well away from the sea near Kielder in Northumberland, the base was an assessment and rehabilitation centre for naval personnel diagnosed with personality disorders.

== Origins ==
Prior to the Second World War the Ministry of Labour had established a number of training centres for unemployed men, one of these was Kielder Camp. In 1941 the Navy was growing increasingly concerned about the number of men suffering from behavioural problems, which prevented them from carrying out full duties. A variety of locations were considered before it was decided to take over the by now deserted labour camp near Kielder. Although the camp was taken over in 1941 it was not until early 1942 that it was commissioned as HMS Standard and the first men posted there.

== Personnel ==
Men posted to the base fell into three categories; those with low morale, men of temperamental instability, and malingerers. The aim was to return these men not necessarily to active service but to some form of effective service.

The base was not a hospital, it was under the command of officers of the Royal Navy executive branch rather than Royal Naval Medical Service, although two Royal Navy psychiatrists were assigned to the base staff.

== Regime ==
The regime of the base had an emphasis on physical labour and education to support the overall aim of returning the men to effective service. Rather than a general regime, each man was assessed and a personalised regime of work, recreation and education established.

== Statistics ==
During the three years HMS Standard was operational, 842 men were assessed of whom 680 were classed as 'successes' because they were drafted to other duties within the Navy with the average period at Standard being four months. Of those redrafted the records are incomplete but some performed well enough to be decorated, while over 100 were the subject later in their service careers of bad reports. The remaining 162 men were all discharged from the Navy.

== Closure ==
HMS Standard was decommissioned in July 1945 after the end of the war in Europe, subsequently the camp became a labour camp for Polish refugees before becoming a Forestry Commission depot. The site of the camp was flooded with the creation of Kielder Water in 1980.
