= Falstone Bridge =

Stone bridge across the River North Tyne at Falstone in Northumberland

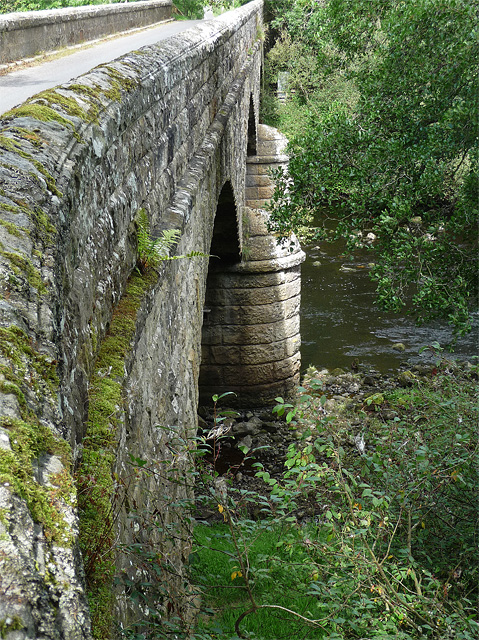
- Coordinates: 55.1775°N 2.4371°W
- OS grid reference: NY72268712
- Carries: Road traffic in and out of Falstone
- Crosses: River North Tyne
- Locale: Northumberland
- Heritage status: Grade II listed

Characteristics
- Design: Arch bridge
- Material: Stone
- No. of spans: 3
- No. of lanes: Single-track road

History
- Designer: Henry Welch
- Construction end: 1843
- Opened: 1843

Falstone Bridge is a stone bridge across the River North Tyne at Falstone in Northumberland.

== History ==
The bridge, which has three stone arches, was built by Henry Welch and completed in 1843. It is a Grade II listed structure. It formed an element of a toll road to Scotland.

Next bridge upstream	River North Tyne	Next bridge downstream
Kielder Viaduct	Falstone Bridge; Grid reference NY723872	Greystead Bridge
