= Dinnington, Tyne and Wear =

Village in Newcastle upon Tyne, England

Coordinates: 55.0540°N 1.6754°W

Dinnington
- Location within Tyne and Wear
- Population: 1,636 (2011)
- Civil parish: Dinnington
- Metropolitan borough: Newcastle upon Tyne; North Tyneside
- Metropolitan county: Tyne and Wear
- Region: North East
- Country: England
- Sovereign state: United Kingdom
- Post town: NEWCASTLE UPON TYNE
- Postcode district: NE13
- Dialling code: 01661
- Police: Northumbria
- Fire: Tyne and Wear
- Ambulance: North East
- UK Parliament: Cramlington and Killingworth

Dinnington is a village and civil parish in the city of Newcastle upon Tyne in Tyne and Wear, England. It is about 9 miles (14 km) north of the city centre, and about 5 miles (8.0 km) north-east of Newcastle International Airport. According to the 2011 Census, Dinnington Parish has 737 households and a population of 1,636; of whom 358 are 65 or over (almost 22%).

== History ==
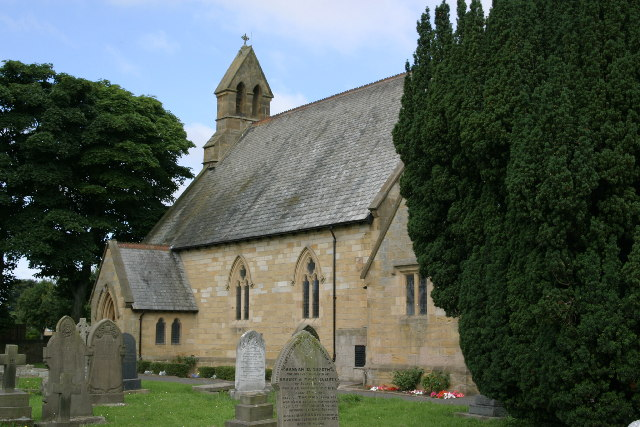
Saint Matthew's Church, Dinnington

The village has been inhabited since before the Iron Age (700 BC). Mining has taken place from at least 1715, with the first deep mine being the Augusta Pit at Dinnington Colliery which was sunk in 1867. 1919 saw the formation of Dinnington Parish Council. In 1974 boundary changes led to the village, previously within Northumberland, being incorporated into the City of Newcastle upon Tyne.

Formerly a coal-mining village with at least four pits within two miles (3 km), Dinnington expanded during the last 40 years of the twentieth century to become a commuter or dormitory village with suburban residential estates and is set for further residential development. Two areas of Green Belt land have been removed to allow 250 private houses to be built and a further 160 have been constructed at Donkey Field.

On 1 April 1876, a 23-years-old miner, George Hunter, was hanged for murder at Morpeth Goal. In December 1875, Hunter and his victim, William Wood, who both worked at Dinnington Colliery, were in a group of armed miners intent on a shooting expedition. Following a snowball fight and altercation outside St Matthew's churchyard on Main Road, Dinnington, Hunter fired at Wood with a shotgun, killing him. He was found guilty of murder on 5 March 1876, the subsequent execution carried out by William Marwood. William Wood was buried at St Matthew's with an attendance of 1,500 people.

== Landmarks ==
Big Waters, a nature reserve at a subsidence pond, is nearby.

== Education ==
The local school, Dinnington First School has around 140-150 pupils and feeds into Gosforth East Middle School. A statutory notice was issued in October 2017 to increase pupil numbers at Dinnington First School from 150 to 300 pupil places by building a new school on the same Sycamore Avenue site. It is planned that the school will double its intake and admit up to 60 pupils into the reception class in September 2019. There will continue to be up to 52 part-time places in the nursery class.
