= Deadwater, Northumberland =

Coordinates: 55.261°N 2.623°W

Deadwater
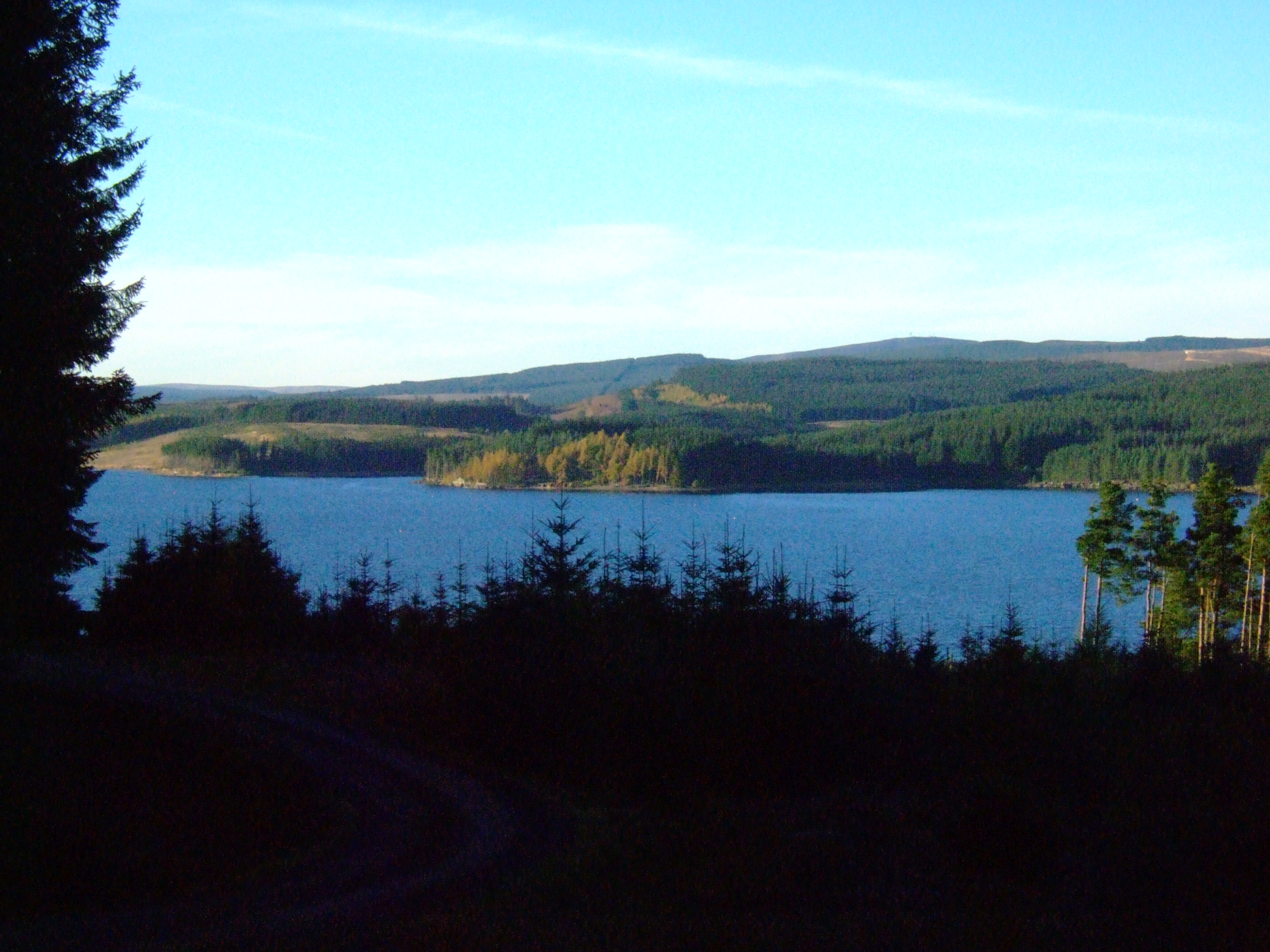
- Kielder Forest and reservoir

- Location within Northumberland
- OS grid reference: NY605965
- Civil parish: Kielder
- Unitary authority: Northumberland
- Ceremonial county: Northumberland
- Region: North East
- Country: England
- Sovereign state: United Kingdom
- Post town: HEXHAM
- Postcode district: NE48
- Dialling code: 01434
- Police: Northumbria
- Fire: Northumberland
- Ambulance: North East
- UK Parliament: Hexham

Deadwater is a small settlement in the civil parish of Kielder, in Northumberland, England, about 3 miles (5 km) north west of Kielder, on the English side of the border between Scotland and England. It is regarded as the source of the River North Tyne, which merges with the River South Tyne near Hexham, and continues around 93 miles/150 km to the North Sea.

== Governance ==
Deadwater is in the parliamentary constituency of Hexham.

== Transport ==
Deadwater was served by Deadwater railway station on the Border Counties Railway which linked the Newcastle and Carlisle Railway, near Hexham, with the Border Union Railway at Riccarton Junction. The first section of the route was opened between Hexham and Chollerford in 1858, the remainder opening in 1862. The line was closed to passengers by British Railways in 1956. Part of the line is now beneath the surface of Kielder Water. The station still stands and looks little different from the days when it was open. It is now in use as a private house.

== See also ==
- Kielder Water
