= Bowes River =

River in Western Australia

Coordinates: 28°24′38″S 114°27′16″E

Location
- Country: Australia

Physical characteristics
- Source
  - elevation: 254 metres (833 ft)
- Mouth
  - location: Indian Ocean
  - elevation: sea level
- Length: 46 km (29 mi)
- Basin size: 714 km^{2} (276 sq mi)

The Bowes River is a river in the Mid West region of Western Australia. It was named on 6 April 1839 by the explorer George Grey while on his second exploration expedition along the Western Australian coast. It was named for Mary Bowes, Dowager Countess of Strathmore, the wife of Sir William Hutt. Hutt was a British Liberal politician who was heavily involved in the colonization of New Zealand and South Australia, and the brother of John Hutt, the second governor of Western Australia. Sir William Hutt was a member of the 1836 select committee on Disposal of Lands in the British Colonies. Grey named the nearby Hutt River after Hutt.

The headwaters of the river rise approximately 10 kilometres (6 mi) north-east of Northampton and flow in a south-westerly direction, crossing the North West Coastal Highway just north of Isseka. The river then continues in a westerly direction before discharging into the Indian Ocean south of Horrocks. The river drains into a small deadwater with a depth of less than 3 metres (10 ft), which is only open to the ocean for a few days a year, generally following rains between June and August.

The river has two tributaries: Sandy Gully and Nokanena Brook.

Contamination of Nokanena Brook from the nearby Uga mine group and Northampton State Battery tailings dam, 1.2 kilometres (1 mi) west of Northampton, has led to elevated lead and cadmium levels in stream water. Lead contamination from Nokanena Brook has also been recorded in Bowes River.
