= Tarset =

Civil parish in Northumberland, England

Coordinates: 55.163°N 2.328°W

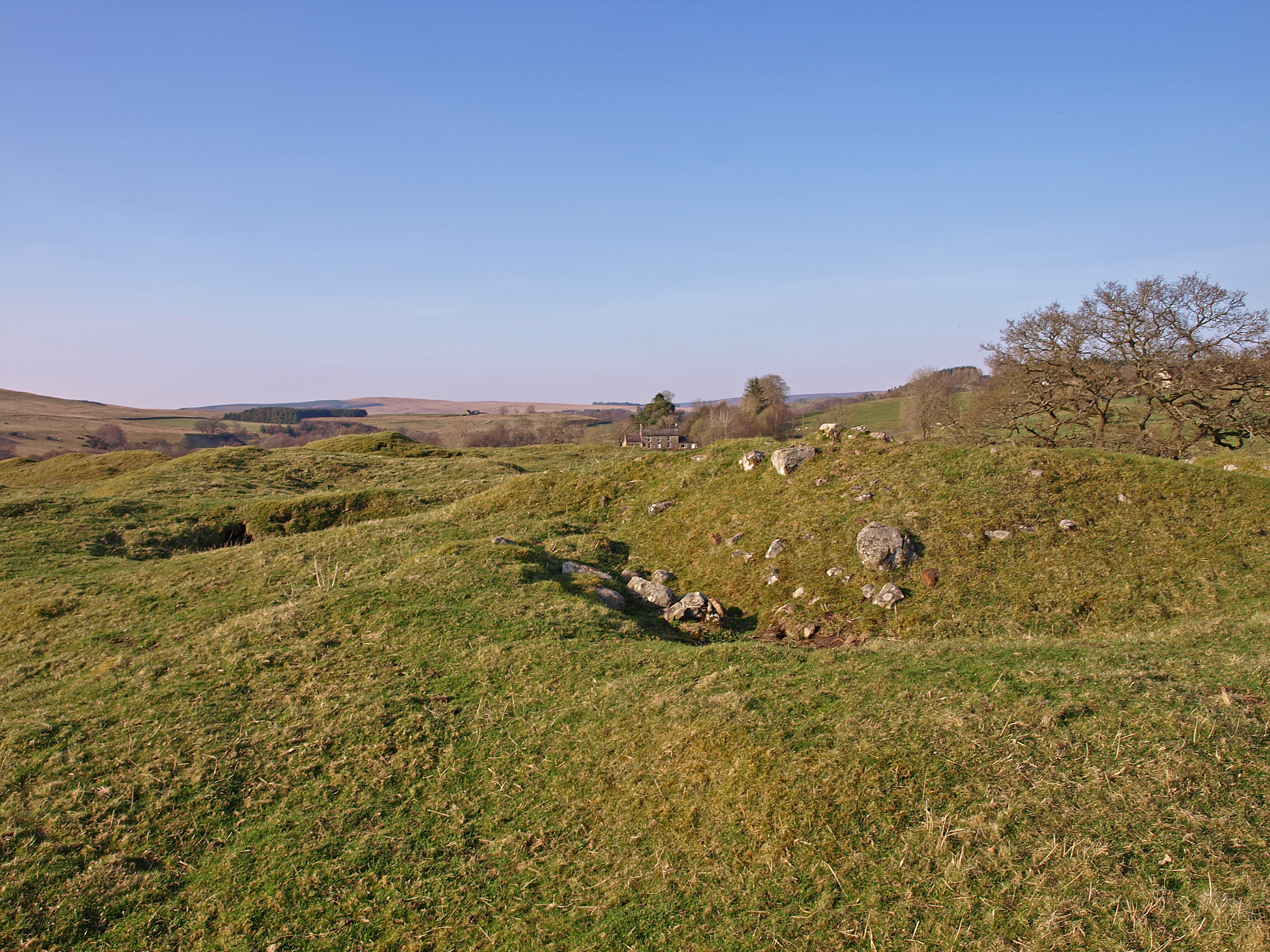
- Remains of Tarset Castle

- Location within Northumberland
- Population: 289 (2011(including Greystead))
- OS grid reference: NY792854
- Civil parish: Tarset
- Unitary authority: Northumberland
- Ceremonial county: Northumberland
- Region: North East
- Country: England
- Sovereign state: United Kingdom
- Post town: HEXHAM
- Postcode district: NE48
- Police: Northumbria
- Fire: Northumberland
- Ambulance: North East
- UK Parliament: Hexham

Tarset is a civil parish in Northumberland, England, created in 1955 from parts of Bellingham, Tarset West and Thorneyburn parishes. It is 4 miles (6 km) west-north-west of Bellingham. Today it shares a parish council with the adjacent parish of Greystead. It is partly located within the Northumberland National Park, and also mostly within the international dark skies park.

== History ==
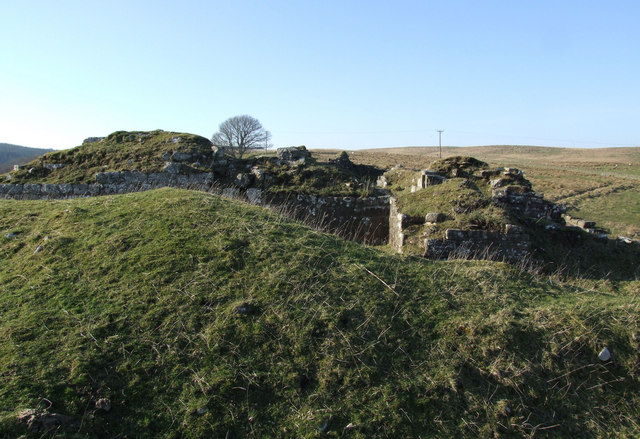
Dally Castle

The Comyns, Scottish knights, were established in Tynedale in the 12th century and the manor of Tarset was granted to William Comyn in around 1222. Licence to crenellate was granted to John Comyn in 1267, and Tarset Castle was built half a mile south-west of the present village, of which only grassed-over remains can now be seen. Two miles to the south-west on Birks Moor are the remains of the fortified house known as Dally Castle, believed to have been erected by David Linsey in his manor of Chirdon.

== Governance ==
Tarset is in the parliamentary constituency of Hexham. The parish council is Tarset with Greystead Parish Council.

== Demography ==
Tarset has a population of 196. In 1831, its population was 169. In 1968, its population was 149.

== Transport ==
Tarset was served by Tarset railway station on the Border Counties Railway which linked the Newcastle and Carlisle Railway, near Hexham, with the Border Union Railway at Riccarton Junction. The first section of the route was opened between Hexham and Chollerford in 1858, the remainder opening in 1862. The line was closed to passengers by British Railways in 1956. Part of the line is now beneath the surface of Kielder Water.

== Notable people ==
John Candlish – politician, Liberal mayor of Sunderland, shipbuilder and glass-bottle manufacturer, owner of Sunderland Beacon and founder of Sunderland News.

Matthew Festing – Prince and Grand Master of the Sovereign Military Order of Malta from 2008 until his resignation in 2017

Field Marshall Sir Francis Festing, last Chief of the Imperial General Staff (1958 - 1961). Father of Matthew.
