= Deadwater railway station =

Former railway station in England

Coordinates: 55.2634°N 2.6256°W

Deadwater
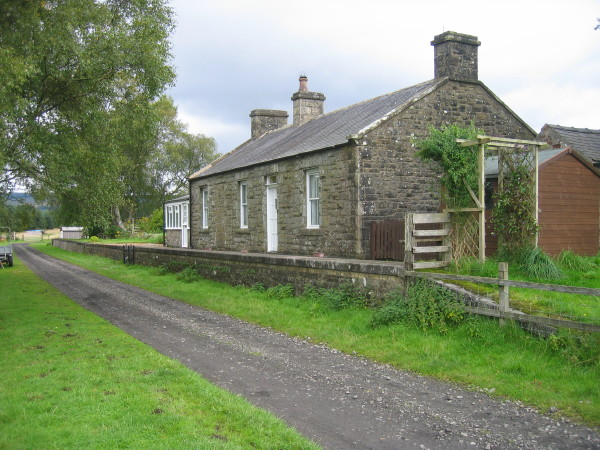
- Station building in September 2009

General information
- Location: Kielder, Northumberland; England
- Grid reference: NY603969
- Platforms: 1

Other information
- Status: Disused

History
- Original company: North British Railway
- Pre-grouping: North British Railway
- Post-grouping: London and North Eastern Railway; North Eastern Region of British Railways

Key dates
- 1880: Station opened as Deadwater Foot Crossing
- 15 October 1956: Station closed to passengers
- 1 September 1958: Station closed to freight
Location

Border Counties Railway

Overview
- Status: Closed
- Locale: Roxburghshire, Scotland; Northumberland, England

Service
- Type: Heavy rail

History
- Work began: 11 December 1855
- Opened: 2 April 1858
- Completed: 24 June 1862
- Merged into: North British Railway - 1860
- Merged into: London North Eastern Railway - 1923
- Merged into: British Railways - 1948
- Closed: 1 September 1958; (except Reedsmouth–Bellingham, closed 11 November 1963)

Technical
- Track gauge: 4 ft 8 1/2 in (1,435 mm)

Deadwater railway station is a closed railway station situated on the border between England and Scotland at the head of the North Tyne River. The station served the settlement of Deadwater which consisted of just six houses.

== History ==
Deadwater railway station was on the Border Counties Railway which linked the Newcastle and Carlisle Railway, near Hexham, with the Border Union Railway at Riccarton Junction. The first section of the route was opened between Hexham and Chollerford in 1858, the remainder opening in 1862. The line was closed to passengers by British Railways in 1956.

The station had a single platform, a stone built station building, and a siding that crossed the border which was just north of the station proper.

The station building and platform still stand.

Former Services

Preceding station	Disused railways	Following station
Saughtree	LNER; Border Counties Railway	Kielder
