= Brunswick Village =

Village in Tyne and Wear, England

Coordinates: 55.048°N 1.638°W

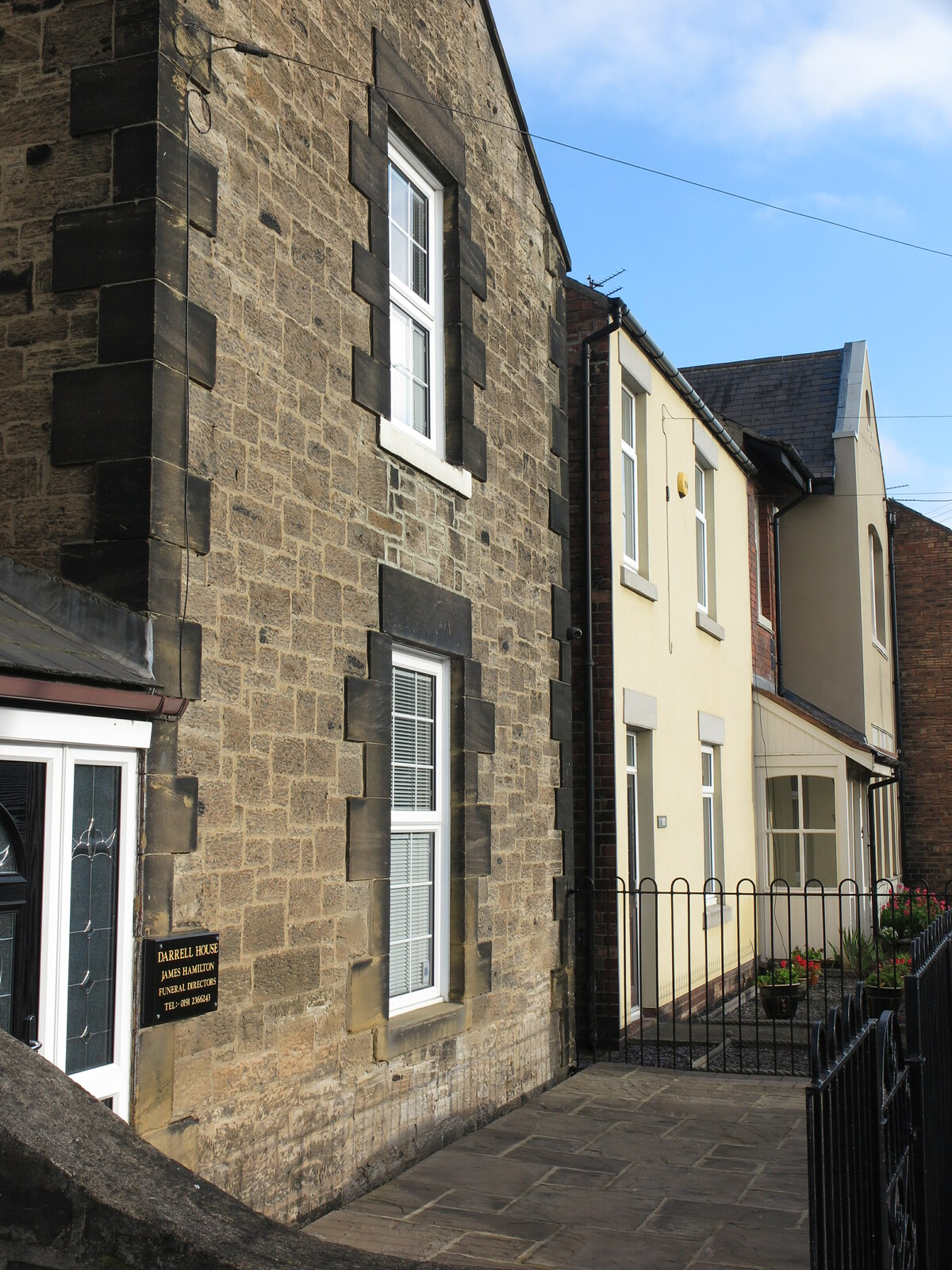
- Darrell Street

- Location within Tyne and Wear
- OS grid reference: NZ231726
- Civil parish: Brunswick
- Metropolitan borough: North Tyneside and Newcastle-upon-Tyne
- Metropolitan county: Tyne and Wear
- Region: North East
- Country: England
- Sovereign state: United Kingdom
- Post town: Newcastle Upon Tyne
- Postcode district: NE13
- Dialling code: 0191
- Police: Northumbria
- Fire: Tyne and Wear
- Ambulance: North East
- UK Parliament: Newcastle upon Tyne North; North Tyneside

Brunswick Village is a village split between North Tyneside and Newcastle upon Tyne, Tyne and Wear, England. It is situated approximately 6 miles north of Newcastle upon Tyne, and borders Hazlerigg, Dinnington and Wideopen. It was formerly known as Dinnington Colliery.

== History ==
Brunswick Village grew up around Dinnington Colliery, named after the nearby village of Dinnington. The first deep mine at the site was sunk in 1867. At its peak the coal mine employed over 1000 people, but closed in February 1960. The village was initially known as Dinnington Colliery, but its name was later changed to Brunswick. The village is half in the metropolitan borough of North Tyneside and half in the metropolitan borough of Newcastle upon Tyne. Brunswick Green housing estate, to the immediate left when you enter the village from the east is wholly in North Tyneside. The rest of the village resides in Newcastle upon Tyne, including the streets to the immediate right when you enter the village.

== Location and facilities ==
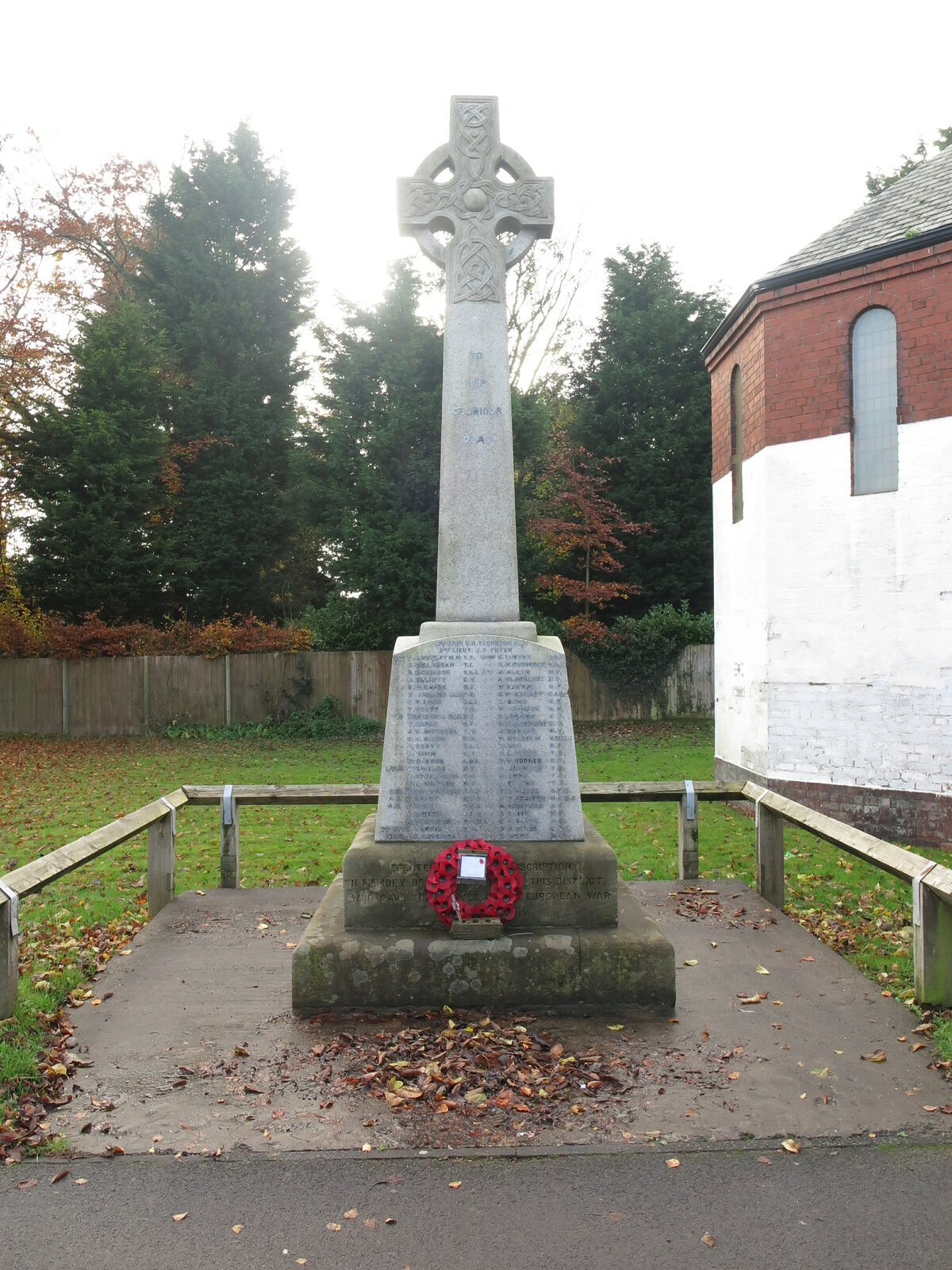
Brunswick Village War Memorial

Brunswick Village has a parish church named after St Cuthbert. The Brunswick war memorial lists the names of villagers who died during the First World War and the Second World War.

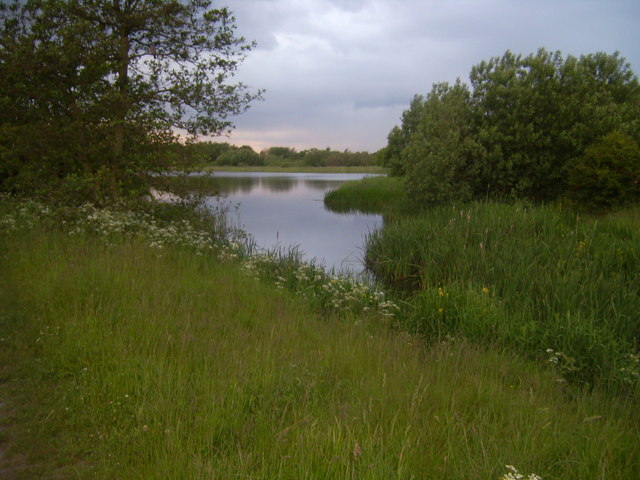
Big Waters Nature Reserve

The Big Waters Nature Reserve, a 50-acre site centred on a lake formed following mining subsidence in the 1920s, is located at the edge of the village. The site of Dinnington Colliery is now occupied by the Brunswick Industrial Estate.

Public transport links to Brunswick are provided by Arriva North East bus route 45, linking the village to Wideopen, Gosforth and Newcastle every 60 minutes.
