= Dally Castle =

Fortress in Northumberland, England

Coordinates: 55.1533°N 2.3549°W

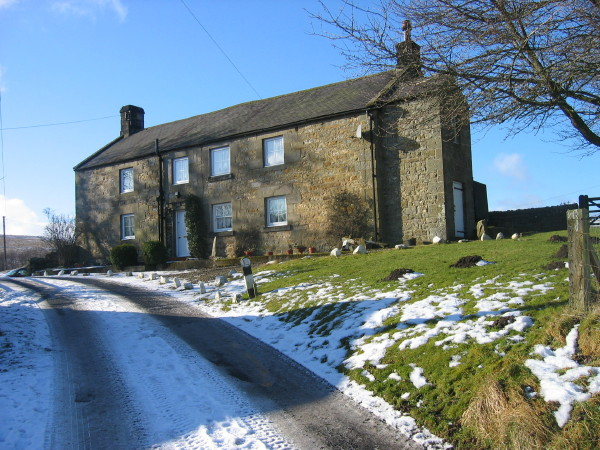
Dally Castle House

Dally Castle is a ruined 13th-century stone motte-and-bailey fortress in Northumberland, and one of the first hall houses in Northumberland. It lies 5 miles (8.0 km) west of Bellingham Castle, and 4 miles (6.4 km) west of Bellingham on the Chirdon Burn, a tributary of the North Tyne. Dally Castle House was built in the 18th century next to the castle. Across the road lies a small flour mill used to grind wheat during the Napoleonic War.

== History ==
Dally Castle was probably built in 1237. On Speed's map of 1611 it is called Dala, and earlier in his Britannia, Camden called it Delaley. Its history is obscure: originally it was an oblong building of two storeys, with two turrets later added to the north corners and a south wing constructed. The stones were used to build Dally Mill and only the foundations can be traced.

DaIly Castle also has its tragic legend: the owner's sister fell in love with her brother's enemy, Gilbert of Tarset. During one of their meetings, the couple were surprised by her brother, who pursued Gilbert to the summit of Hareshaw Common. A fight took place and Gilbert was slain. The spot where he felI is known today as Gib's Cross.

The castle has been identified with the 'house in the form of a tower' that either David de Lindsay, justiciar of Lothian, or his young namesake, the ward of Alexander of Scotland, was building in Tynedale in 1237, to the alarm of the sheriff Hugh of Bolbec; however, for this there is no positive evidence, and as David had been granted Chirdon (commanding a more important crossing of the Chirdon burn than Dally does) and one would have expected him to build there. The castle was at first a simple oblong building, defended at ground floor level by loopholes for bowmen, and having an upper floor, presumably entered by an outside wooden stair. Its date might have been either in the reign of John or in that of his successor, Henry III. Later in the thirteenth century, the building (which may have been left unfinished) was completed with the addition of a north-west corner turret and south wing, and its defence was moved from the ground floor to crenellated parapets at roof level; at that point the loopholes no longer needed to be carefully built up, except one which was enlarged to light a chamber with a fireplace. Later a north-east turret was added, the south-west corner was strengthened, and an enclosure made on the south scarp of the castle hill. The building continued in habitation till the sixteenth century or later, as is proved by the helmet, sword point, and 'fairy' tobacco pipes found under the debris of the north-west turret in 1888; however, it had become a ruin before Camden visited it in the reign of James I. The Armstrongs' map shows it as a ruin, and apparently during the eighteenth century the roofless walls collapsed and all visible and easily accessible stones were removed to help build Dally Mill. At any rate, when John Hodgson visited Dally he could see no masonry above the turf.

In 1888, Mr. W. L. Charleton removed enough of the debris to reveal the remains hereafter described, but most unfortunately no proper record was kept of his funds and the owner allowed a set of 'fine columns', probably the supports of the hall roof, to be taken away to build a piggery. Even the plan published seventeen years later in Proceedings of the Society of Antiquaries of Newcastle upon Tyne was neither complete nor accurate. An interesting Early English pierced chimney head, one of the very few of that period in existence, was found and removed by Mr. Charleton.

== Description ==
The upper and lower halves of the valley watered by the Chirdon are separated by a natural barrier in the shape of a high steep-sided ridge or "kaim" pierced at east end by the stream. The eastern part this ridge has been isolated by cutting a gap through it, as in the similar case of Wark on Tweed. A smaller notch cuts off the extreme eastern point of the ridge, and Dally castle stands along the narrow top of the ridge with its west end overlooking the larger ditch. There are also traces of masonry on the low mound east of the eastern ditch.

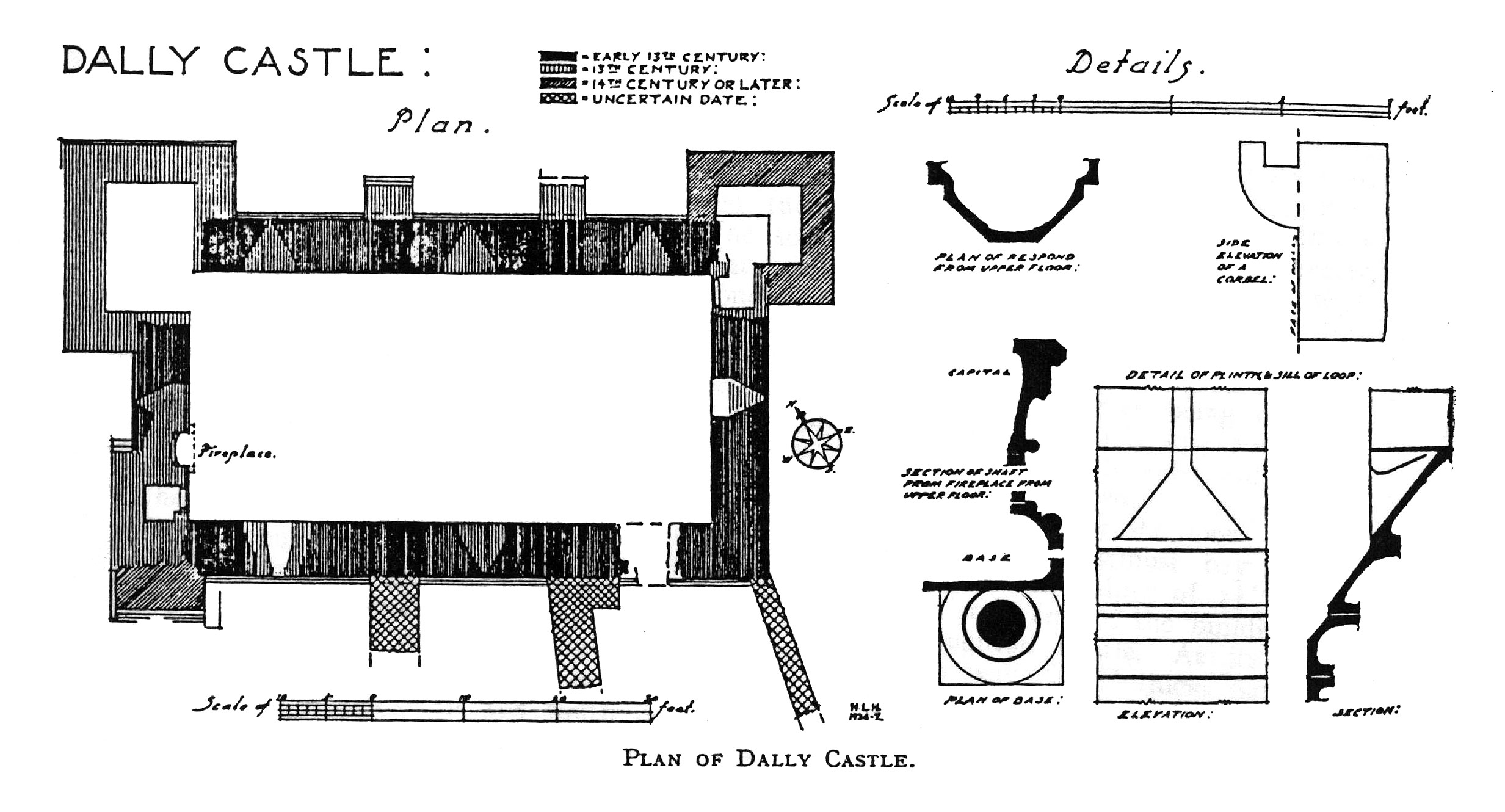
Floor plan.

The castle proper was in two portions, the first a building about 30 by 15 feet (9.1 by 4.6 m) east of the main building and not on the same orientation. It is not now possible to state its period or use: it may have been a barn, or even a chapel. The second was an oblong block 56' 6" by 26' 8" (17.2 by 8.1 m) internally, with attached turrets at the two northern corners and a larger turret or wing on the south. The south wing has entirely disappeared except for short lengths of its walls, and these are certainly additions to the main south wall, to which they have been bonded. The walls of the main block are from 5 3/4 to 6 feet (1.75 to 1.83 m) thick and contain 2-inch (5.1 cm) fish-tailed loopholes as shown on the plan and detail drawings. The loopholes have been very neatly built up with masonry, faced with the same kind of ashlar as that in the rest of the interior; the courses are carefully lined through, though not bonded, and triangular stones are neatly cut out to fit the narrow part of the embrasure and even to fit into the fish-tailed sill. The embrasure of the loophole in the east gable was not entirely blocked; the upper part of it became a cupboard with a giblet check cut in each jamb for its door, and a heavily barred window took the place of a loophole on the westmost bay of the south front. This window was surrounded by quarter-round moulding of 2 1/4-inch (5.7 cm) radius and the edges of the loopholes are neatly rounded.

The west end of the building has marked resemblance in plan to the east end of Haughton Castle. At its north corner there is a turret 9' 7" by I3' 10" (2.92 by 4.22 m) internally with walls 4 feet 6 inches (1.37 m) thick, having an external base course which butts irregularly against the double chamfered base of the main building. At the south corner, a narrow door with chamfered jambs and sill gives entrance to what must have been either a mural stair or a small turret; this formed a weak point both structurally and strategically and was twice strengthened and reconstructed. Beside the door is a fireplace resembling (even in its dimensions) that at Haughton, and obviously an insertion as it blocks one of the earlier archery embrasures. Its projecting hood was supported on a pair of plain splayed corbels. Both in the turret and the fireplace there is much thin flat-bedded rubble, a feature also found at Haughton. The north front has two broad buttresses, both of which are additions to the work; one of them has still two weathered courses on its face, and the other is incomplete. From their setting out (see plan) these buttresses were built with the north-west turret but earlier than the north-east one. This north turret seems to have replaced a mural stair or small chamber like that at the south-west corner, and the lower part of the earlier corner can be seen inside it, for it has no door. Its walls are both thinner and rougher than those elsewhere, and internally are of a deep red colour. They have never been plastered, but the whole of the rest of the interior, whether rubble in the turret or ashlar in the central space, has been skimmed with a thin coat of plaster. neatly finished to a straight 1 1/2-inch (3.8 cm) edge.

The north and south sides of the building have double base courses externally, but these are not returned across the gables. From the south-east corner, a wall 28 inches (71 cm) thick ran down the south scarp of the hill all the way to a ditch which runs in a curve all round castle and hill, passing through the two already mentioned gaps in the kaim. From the existing remains we know that the ground floor of the castle had central pillars macing a longitudinal beam on which the first floor joists rested, their ends being notched to 3 3/4-inch-wide (9.5 cm) runners supported on corbels (see details). On the upper floor there was a central colonnade, with responds at the ends, supporting either arches or more probably a timber framework to carry the roof. At the west end of the first floor was a fireplace flanked by detached columns with attached moulded caps and bases. Somewhere also at the west end was a neat chimney head with four small outlets for smoke, and if this was really David de Lindsay's stronghold we know from Hugh of Bolbec's description that it had parapet walks round its roof. The existence of parapets is not necessarily confirmed by the presence of several lengths of 12 1/2-inch-wide (32 cm) stone channels, but with the blocking up of the loopholes it became almost essential to provide parapets, if only on the turrets.

There is a ford at Dally, but the right bank of the Chirdon is steep and craggy and a narrow pack-horse or foot bridge of timber on stone abutments was thrown across the water, probably at some period when either Dally Castle or Dally Mill was in occupation. The stone abutments are well built of rubble in mortar and have the unusual feature of terminating in semicircular ends facing across the stream.

Dally Castle was purchased from the Earl of Suffolk in 1664 by William Charlton of the Bower, and in 1841 when the rest of the estate passed to Sir Edward Haggerston.
