= Isseka, Western Australia =

Isseka
- Town
- Coordinates: 28°26′S 114°39′E
- Country: Australia
- State: Western Australia
- LGA(s): Shire of Northampton
- Location: 475 km (295 mi) NNW of Perth; 10 km (6.2 mi) south of Northampton; 39 km (24 mi) north of Geraldton
- Established: 1913

Government
  - State electorate(s): Moore
  - Federal division(s): Durack

Area
  - Total: 3.2 km^{2} (1.2 sq mi)
- Elevation: 116 m (381 ft)

Population
  - Total(s): 57 (SAL 2021)
- Postcode: 6535

Isseka is a small town in the Mid West region of Western Australia.

Located on the North West Coastal Highway, the town is also close to the Bowes River.

The town is situated on a railway siding that was also named Isseka. The local progress association requested blocks to be released in the area in 1912. The townsite was gazetted in 1913.

The town was where the Premier of Western Australia David Brand spent part of his schooling.
