= Deadwater, Hampshire =

Village in Hampshire, England

Coordinates: 51.112574°N 0.850373°W

Deadwater
- Location within Hampshire
- OS grid reference: SU809360
- Civil parish: Lindford
- District: East Hampshire
- Shire county: Hampshire
- Region: South East
- Country: England
- Sovereign state: United Kingdom
- Post town: BORDON
- Postcode district: GU35 0
- Dialling code: 01420
- Police: Hampshire and Isle of Wight
- Fire: Hampshire and Isle of Wight
- Ambulance: South Central
- UK Parliament: East Hampshire

Deadwater is a small village in the East Hampshire district of Hampshire, England. It is 1.3 miles (2.1 km) east of Bordon, its nearest town. It also borders the neighbouring village of Hollywater. The nearest railway station is Liphook, 4.1 miles (6.3 km) southeast of the village.
