= Thorneyburn =

Village in Northumberland, England

Coordinates: 55.181°N 2.371°W

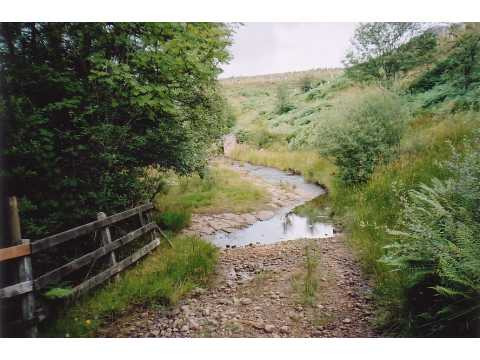
- Slaty Ford

- Location within Northumberland
- OS grid reference: NY765875
- Civil parish: Tarset
- Unitary authority: Northumberland
- Shire county: Northumberland
- Region: North East
- Country: England
- Sovereign state: United Kingdom
- Post town: HEXHAM
- Postcode district: NE48
- Police: Northumbria
- Fire: Northumberland
- Ambulance: North East
- UK Parliament: Hexham

Thorneyburn is a village and former civil parish, now in the parish of Tarset, in Northumberland, England, to the northwest of Bellingham. In 1951 the parish had a population of 74.

== Governance ==
Thorneyburn is in the parliamentary constituency of Hexham. On 1 April 1958 the parish was abolished to form Tarset.

== Transport ==
Thorneyburn was served by Thorneyburn railway station on the Border Counties Railway which linked the Newcastle and Carlisle Railway, near Hexham, with the Border Union Railway at Riccarton Junction. The first section of the route was opened between Hexham and Chollerford in 1858, the remainder opening in 1862. The line was closed to passengers by British Railways in 1956. Part of the line is now beneath the surface of Kielder Water.

To the west of the station was the Thorneyburn Tileworks.

== Religious sites ==
The church, on the east side of Thorneyburn Common, is dedicated to St Aidan.
