= Benshaw Moor =

Nature reserve in Northumberland, England

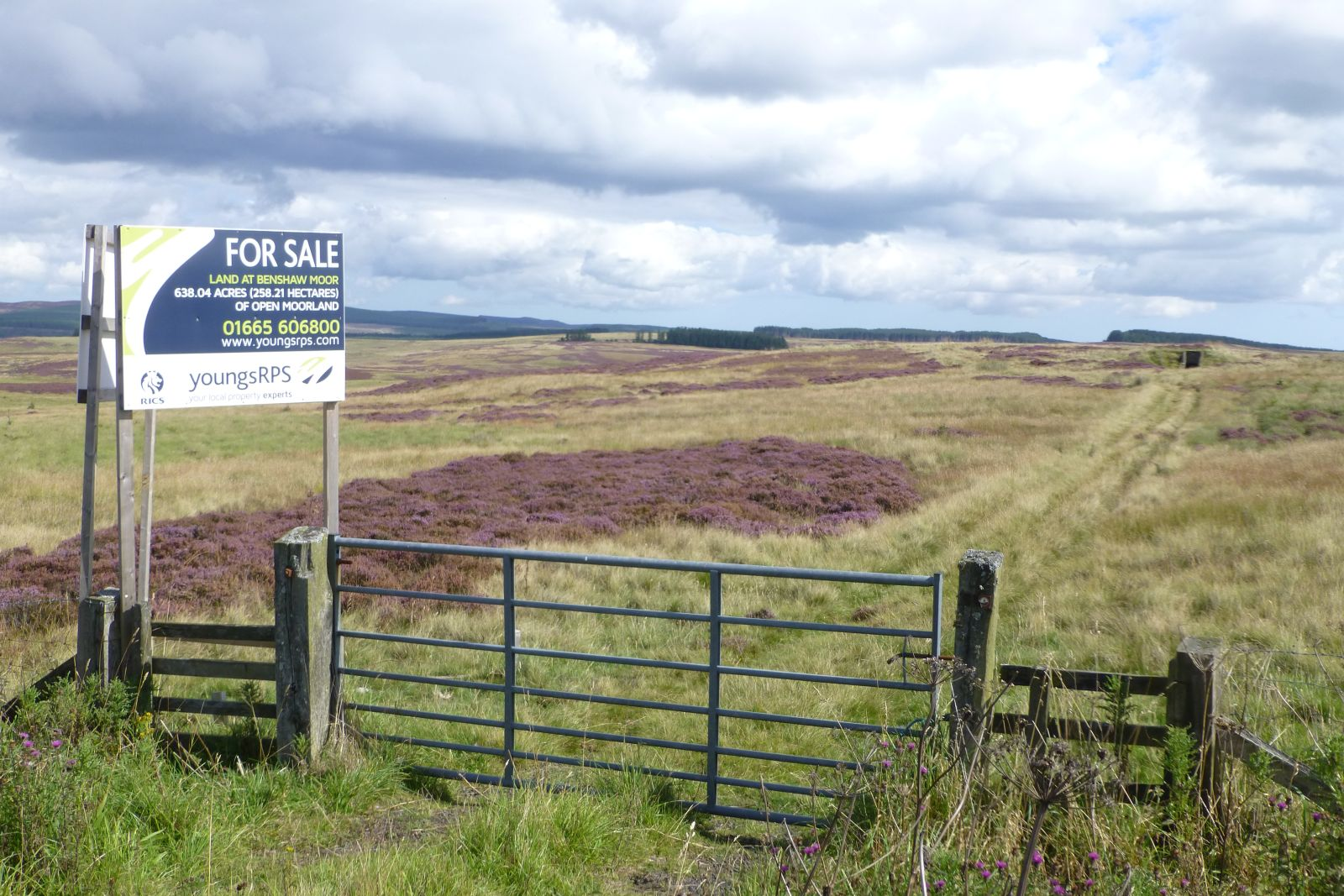
- For sale in 2017

- Location within Northumberland
- Interactive map of Benshaw Moor
- Location: near Elsdon, Northumberland
- OS grid: NY 946 912
- Coordinates: 55°12′54″N 2°05′11″W
- Area: 258 hectares (640 acres)
- Operator: Northumberland Wildlife Trust
- Website: www.nwt.org.uk/nature-reserves/benshaw-moor

Benshaw Moor is nature reserve of the Northumberland Wildlife Trust, near Elsdon, in Redesdale, Northumberland, England. It is a large site with varied habitats.

== History ==
The Trust purchased the site in May 2019, considering that it would be inappropriate for it to be used for commercial conifer forestry, which was thought likely when it came on sale. This followed an appeal to raise the amount required, which resulted in donations from charitable trusts, businesses, private donors and a bequest, for use in buying a site of botanical importance, from the estate of George Swan, emeritus professor of organic chemistry at Newcastle University.

== Description ==
The area of the reserve is 258 hectares (640 acres). Since the purchase, the site has been surveyed, to become more familiar with its features, and there has been public consultation regarding its long-term management and arrangement for visitors to access the site.

There is blanket bog, heathland, acid grassland, marshy grassland and transitional mire. These varied habitats support a wide range of wildlife.

Butterflies in summer include pearl-bordered fritillary and large heath. The bogs have plants such as sphagnum moss, cranberry and roundleaf sundew.

There are no paths on the reserve. Visitors are advised to have hill-walking experience if attempting long walks, as it is a remote area and the weather can change quickly.

=== "Living landscape" project ===
The site is in the area of the Revitalising Redesdale Landscape Partnership, of which the Trust is one of twelve partners including Natural England and Northumberland National Park. The site also lies near Harwood Forest and Kielder Forest. It is envisaged that the area may become an example of a "Living Landscape"; creating such areas of connected sites is a project of the Wildlife Trusts, to improve the landscape for the long-term future.

=== Blanket bog ===
This kind of terrain evolves over acidic bedrock where rainfall exceeds loss of water through evaporation and plant transpiration; the species of plants in this environment do not break down, and peat accumulates. The vegetation, having a barrier of peat below it, is fed only by rainwater, and the bog becomes low in nutrients. Blanket bog in the United Kingdom began to develop 5000 to 6000 years ago; it is in the west and north, and most of it is in Scotland.
