= Bakethin Reservoir =

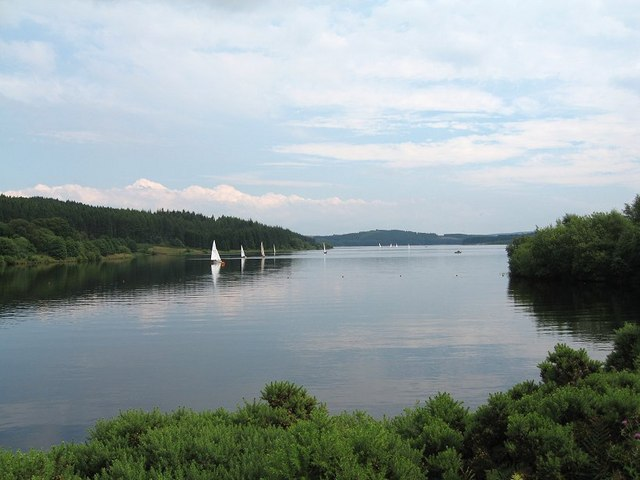
- Bakethin Reservoir in 2007, viewed from its weir

- Location within Northumberland
- Coordinates: 55.218°N 2.574°W
- Type: Reservoir
- Primary inflows: River North Tyne
- Basin countries: England

Bakethin Reservoir is a reservoir immediately upstream of Kielder Water, in Northumberland, England, close to the border with Scotland. It is fed by the River North Tyne and lies southeast of Kielder village.

The reservoir is created by the weir that separates it from Kielder Water, and its purpose is to prevent the shallow upper reaches of Kielder Water from drying out with the rise and fall in level of the main reservoir. Bakethin is a conservation area, which is managed by Northumberland Wildlife Trust on behalf of Northumbrian Water.

== Flora and fauna ==
The reserve has an excellent variety of plants including rarities like the Northern Spike Rush which grows along the margins of the reservoir. The construction of artificial islands near the south bank of the reservoir encourage nesting wildfowl and otters. Two ponds created near the viaduct also provide excellent habitat for amphibians and dragonflies.
