= Bellingham Castle =

Motte and bailey fortress in Northumberland, founded by the De Bellingham family

Coordinates: 55.1428°N 2.251°W

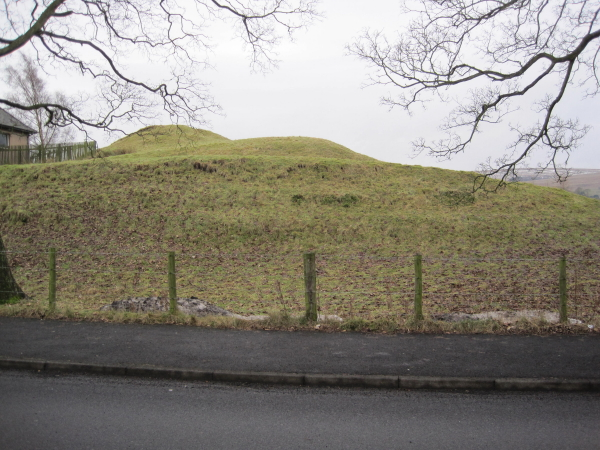
Motte of Bellingham Castle

Bellingham Castle was a motte and bailey fortress in Northumberland, founded by the De Bellingham family. Its remains lie 5 miles east of Dally Castle, near the village of Bellingham. There is no evidence to suggest that any fortification existed on the site before 1157, when the lands were granted as liberty to the King of Scotland. According to sources, a castle and manor house was erected on a mound now known as Hallsfield during the reign of Richard II by a certain Richard De Bellingham of the De Bellingham Family, who were given the estate as well as the title of Baron by the monarch. The estate was then passed on to the Derwentwater family. However due to his joining the rebel cause during the Jacobite Rising of 1715, James Radclyffe, 3rd Earl of Derwentwater was stripped of his title and his estate and after his attainder and execution, the manor was awarded to the Governors of the Greenwich Hospital. By the 13th century all traces of the castle proper and its fortifications had been lost.
