= Butteryhaugh =

Village in Northumberland, England

Coordinates: 55.230°N 2.580°W

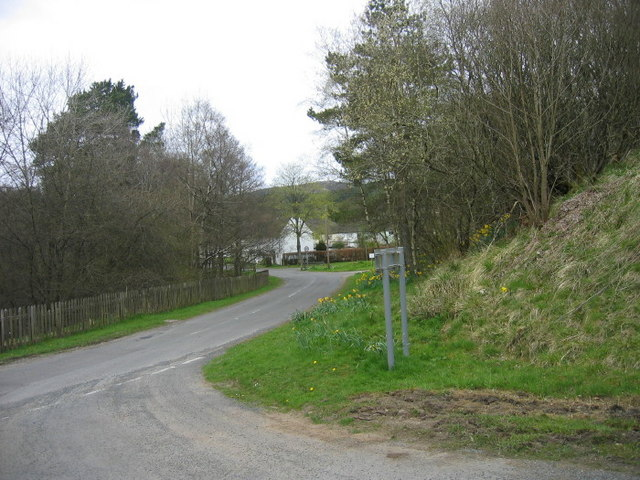
- View into Butteryhaugh from the south

- Location within Northumberland
- OS grid reference: NY632931
- Civil parish: Kielder
- Unitary authority: Northumberland
- Ceremonial county: Northumberland
- Region: North East
- Country: England
- Sovereign state: United Kingdom
- Post town: HEXHAM
- Postcode district: NE48
- Police: Northumbria
- Fire: Northumberland
- Ambulance: North East
- UK Parliament: Hexham

Butteryhaugh is a village in the civil parish of Kielder, in Northumberland, England. It lies 0.5 km to the south-east of Kielder.

Although a separate settlement from Kielder, Kielder is generally accepted as including Butteryhaugh. Butteryhaugh was intended to be the second of five villages to be built in the area to accommodate forestry workers at Kielder Forest. With the mechanisation of forest activities, and hence the need for fewer workers, the final three villages were never constructed.

The village is 2 miles (3 km) from the border with Scotland.

== Governance ==
Butteryhaugh is in the parliamentary constituency of Hexham.
