= Kielder Observatory =

Observatory in Northumberland, England

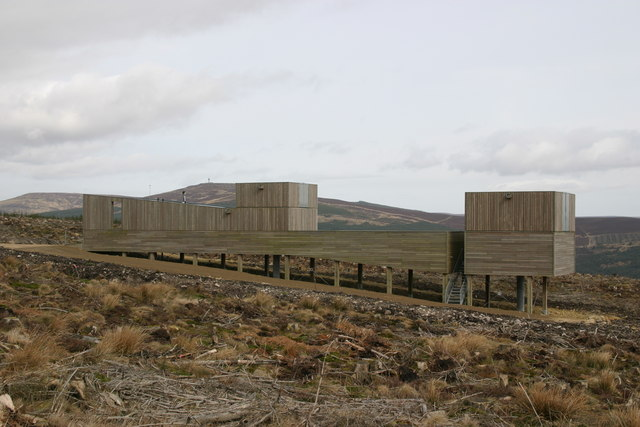
- Kielder Observatory
- Organization: Kielder Observatory Astronomical Society
- Location: Kielder Forest, Northumberland, England
- Coordinates: 55°13′55″N 2°36′58.5″W
- Altitude: 370 m (1,210 ft)
- Established: 2008
- Website: www.kielderobservatory.org

Telescopes
- Sir Patrick Moore Observatory: 16-inch TS Optics f/8 Ritchey-Chretien Reflector
- Caroline Herschel Observatory: 16-inch ACF telescope
- Portable Telescopes: 3 × 12-inch Skywatcher Skyliner 300P Dobsonian
- Gillian Dickinson Astroimaging Academy 1: 10-inch TS Optics Ritchey-Chretien Reflector
- Gillian Dickinson Astroimaging Academy 2: 14-inch TS Optics Ritchey-Chretien Reflector
- Gillian Dickinson Astroimaging Academy 3: 4-inch Takahashi FSQ-106EDX4 Refractor
- Tanlaw Radio Telescope: 5m Radio2Space PrimaLuce SPIDER 500 Radio
- Related media on Commons

Kielder Observatory is an astronomical observatory located in Kielder Forest, Northumberland, England. The site is on Black Fell, overlooking Kielder Water near the Scottish border. It is accessible from James Turrell's Kielder Skyspace via a half-mile long forest track.

The observatory's design is the result of a competition managed by RIBA Competitions which was won by London-based Charles Barclay Architects. The building is powered by solar panels and a wind turbine. It won the RIBA Award for its architecture in 2009 and also that same year a Civic Trust Award.

The observatory is administered by the Kielder Observatory Astronomical Society, which is a registered charity consisting of a board of Trustees and ten permanent members of staff responsible for educational delivery.

== History ==
Kielder Forest was a popular place for stargazing before the construction of the observatory, with the Kielder Forest Star Camp being an annual event. Amateur astronomer Gary Fildes—who had been involved with the Star Camp—began advocating for an observatory to be built within the forest and led a campaign that raised several hundred thousand pounds to pay for construction. Kielder Observatory was officially opened on 25 April, 2008 by Sir Arnold Wolfendale, the 14th Astronomer Royal, and in its first year entertained approximately 1200 guests. In 2014, the observatory had nearly 20,000 visitors, thus making it one of the top tourist destinations in Northumberland.

In 2018, Kielder Observatory expanded to accommodate construction of the Gillian Dickinson Astroimaging Academy.

The observatory also runs educational outreach activities in schools throughout the region via a project co-funded by various local authorities. In 2019, Kielder Observatory was awarded funding and contract for delivery in the North of Tyne Combined Authority district.

In 2021, the observatory constructed a 5-metre (16 ft) Radio2Space Radio Antenna, donated by the Tanlaw Foundation. This project is intended to educate the general public on Radio Astronomy and assist teaching programmes in schools.

In 2023, the otherwise-named 16-inch Observatory, was renamed to the Caroline Herschel Observatory in memorandum of her contributions to science and astronomy. A plaque was unveiled by local author LJ Ross.

== Staff ==
The science communication team at the observatory consists of practical and observational astronomers and astrophysicists.

- Dan Pye – Director of Astronomy and Science Communication
- Daniel Monk – Director of the Gillian Dickinson Astro-imaging Academy
- Eleanor Macdonald – Science Lead
- Adam Shore – Education Lead

== Awards ==
- Northumberland What's On Where Award 2015 – Best Visitor Attraction
- North East Tourism Awards 2014 – Small Visitor Attraction (Silver Award)
- Visit England Gold Award 2013 – Kielder Water Forest Park

== See also ==
- List of observatories
