= Whitelee Moor =

Nature reserve in Northumberland, England

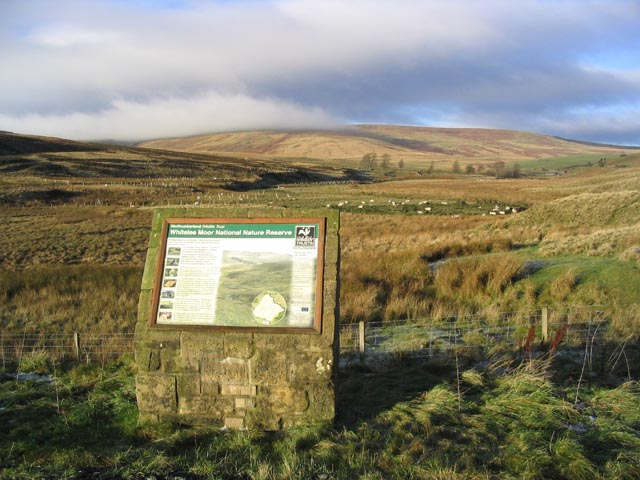
- The view from an information board by the A68 road

- Location within Northumberland
- Location: near Carter Bar
- OS grid: NT 700 040
- Coordinates: 55°19′44″N 2°28′27″W
- Area: 1,510 hectares (3,700 acres)
- Operator: Northumberland Wildlife Trust
- Designation: National nature reserve Site of Special Scientific Interest; Special Area of Conservation
- Website: www.nwt.org.uk/nature-reserves/whitelee-moor

Whitelee Moor is nature reserve of the Northumberland Wildlife Trust, in Northumberland, England, near Carter Bar. A large part of the moor is blanket bog.

It is a national nature reserve, and is in a Special Area of Conservation. Being part of Kielderhead and Emblehope Moors, it is a Site of Special Scientific Interest.

== Description ==
Whitelee Moor was bought by the Trust in 1999, with help from the National Lottery Heritage Fund. Its area is 1,510 hectares (3,700 acres).

There is blanket bog, heather moorland and grassland; also more than 35 hectares (86 acres) of new woodland. The River Rede and its tributaries provide diversity of habitat.

Visitors are advised to have hill-walking experience if attempting long walks, as it is a remote area and the weather can change quickly.

=== Blanket bog ===
This kind of terrain evolves over acidic bedrock where rainfall exceeds loss of water through evaporation and plant transpiration; the species of plants in this environment do not break down, and peat accumulates. The vegetation, having a barrier of peat below it, is fed only by rainwater, and the bog becomes low in nutrients. Blanket bog in the United Kingdom began to develop 5000 to 6000 years ago; it is in the west and north, and most of it is in Scotland.

The blanket bog has plants such as sphagnum moss, bog asphodel and cloudberry. Drainage channels, formerly dug across the bog, have been dammed to ensure that it remains wet.

=== Woodland and moorland ===
On the moorland, birds such as red grouse, peregrine falcon and hen harrier may be seen. Butterflies in summer include ringlet and small heath. A notable insect is the northern eggar moth.

The new woodland contains birch, rowan and willow; there is ash and oak in sheltered places.
