= Tarset Castle =

Ruined castle in Northumberland, England

- Northumberland, England, UK
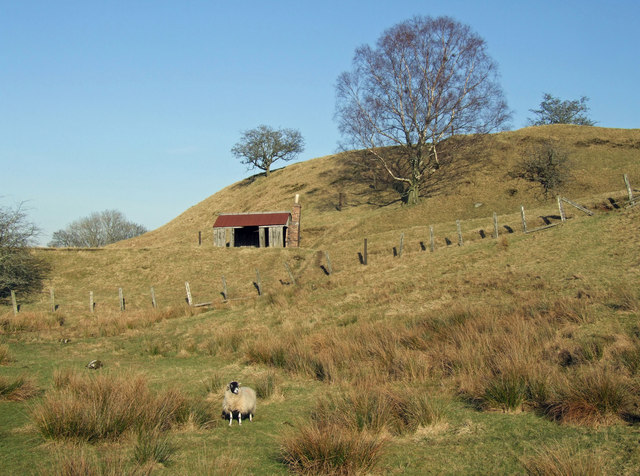
- The ruins of Tarset Castle (in the background)

Location
- Location in Northumberland
- Coordinates: 55.163°N 2.334°W
- Grid reference: NY788854

Tarset Castle is a ruin near Tarset in Northumberland.

== History ==
A licence to crenellate was granted to John Comyn in 1267, and the castle was built half a mile south-west of the present village of Tarset. The castle, which had four square corner turrets, was destroyed by Sir Ralph Fenwick in 1525. All that remains now is some stone foundations on top of a mound.

The remains of the castle are a Grade II* listed structure.
