= Falstone railway station =

Former railway station in England

Coordinates: 55.1791°N 2.4317°W

Falstone
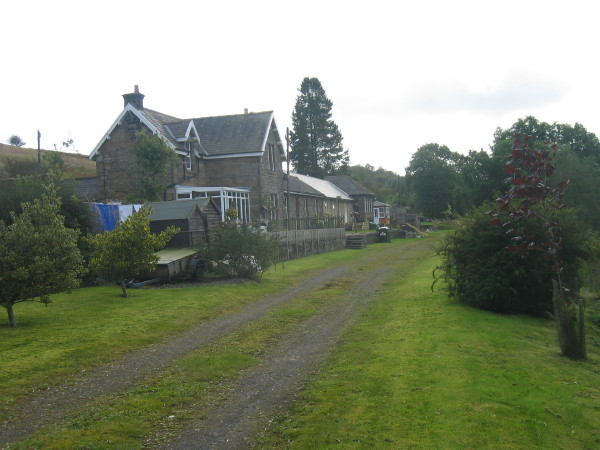
- Station building in 2009.

General information
- Location: Falstone, Northumberland; England
- Grid reference: NY726874
- Platforms: 1

Other information
- Status: Disused

History
- Original company: Border Counties Railway
- Pre-grouping: North British Railway
- Post-grouping: London and North Eastern Railway; North Eastern Region of British Railways

Key dates
- 2 September 1861: Station opened
- 15 October 1956: Station closed to passengers
- 1 September 1958: Station closed to freight
Location

Border Counties Railway

Overview
- Status: Closed
- Locale: Roxburghshire, Scotland; Northumberland, England

Service
- Type: Heavy rail

History
- Commenced: 11 December 1855
- Opened: 2 April 1858
- Completed: 24 June 1862
- Merged into: North British Railway - 1860
- Merged into: London North Eastern Railway - 1923
- Merged into: British Railways - 1948
- Closed: 1 September 1958; (except Reedsmouth–Bellingham, closed 11 November 1963)

Technical
- Track gauge: 4 ft 8 1/2 in (1,435 mm)

Falstone railway station is a former railway station that served the hamlet of Falstone, in Northumberland, England.

== History ==
The station was on the Border Counties Railway which linked the Newcastle and Carlisle Railway, near Hexham, with the Border Union Railway at Riccarton Junction. The first section of the route was opened between Hexham and Chollerford in 1858, the remainder opening 1861–1862. The line was closed to passengers by British Railways in 1956.

The station had a single platform and a stone built station building both of which survived the line's closure. The station building is residential accommodation and offices.

Former services

Preceding station	Disused railways	Following station
Plashetts	LNER; Border Counties Railway	Thorneyburn
