= Northumberland Wildlife Trust =

Conservation charity in England

- Formation: 1971
- Type: Registered Charity
- Headquarters: St. Nicholas Park, Gosforth
- Location: Northumberland
- Chief Executive: Mike Pratt
- Staff: 50+
- Website: www.nwt.org.uk

Northumberland Wildlife Trust was established in 1971 (following a split from the Northumberland & Durham Trust, established 1962) to help conserve and protect the wildlife of Northumberland, Newcastle upon Tyne and North Tyneside in the UK. The Trust is a charity, and a member of The Wildlife Trusts partnership.

== About ==
The Trust was founded by Tony Tynan, and to honour that fact he has been given the title of Founder.

Particular projects where the Trust has a special expertise include Red Squirrel conservation and peatland restoration.

The Trust has an active team engaged in education activities including projects based in North Northumberland, Blyth Valley district and Newcastle and North Tyneside. It runs activities in which volunteers can participate every Tuesday, Wednesday, Thursday, Friday and alternate Sundays. Volunteers help to maintain the Trust's nature reserves.

The Trust is a charity and relies heavily on its members to help fund its activities.

== Reserves ==
The Trust manages 60 nature reserves including Hauxley and East Chevington on the Northumberland Coast to Whitelee Moor, a 15 square kilometre hill farm on the Scottish Border.

The foreshore at Cresswell was acquired by the Trust in 2006, and Benshaw Moor in Redesdale in 2019.

In addition to its nature reserves, the Trust manages Weetslade Country Park on behalf of the Land Restoration Trust and Bakethin Reservoir conservation area on behalf of Northumbrian Water.

In 2026 the Wildlife Trusts mounted a campaign to raise £30 million to buy the 3,800 hectare Rothbury Estate in the centre of the county, reaching the target at the end of October. The estate which includes moorland, woodland and farmland will be managed by Northumberland Wildlife Trust for multiple objectives.

== Headquarters ==
Northumberland Wildlife Trust headquarters are located on one of their reserves, St Nicholas Park, Gosforth. Most of the Trust's staff are based here, as are part of Save Our Squirrels Northumberland.

== Patrons ==
- Bill Oddie (to 2010)
- Conrad Dickinson (2010 onwards)

== List of reserves ==
The full list of reserves can be seen at the Trust's website.

- Hauxley on the Northumberland Coast
- East Chevington on the Northumberland Coast
- Whitelee Moor, a 15 square kilometre hill farm on the Scottish Border
- Cresswell beach
- Weetslade Country Park, managed on behalf of the Land Restoration Trust
- Bakethin Reservoir, Kielder Water, conservation area managed on behalf of Northumbrian Water
- Big Waters in Tyne and Wear

== See also ==
- Conservation biology
- Conservation ethic
- Conservation movement
- Ecology
- Ecology movement
- Environmentalism
- Environmental movement
- Environmental protection
- Habitat conservation
- List of environmental organizations
- Natural environment
- Natural capital
- Natural resource
- Renewable resource
- Sustainable development
- Sustainability
