= Arnold Wolfendale =

British physicist

Sir Arnold Wolfendale FRS FRAS FInstP
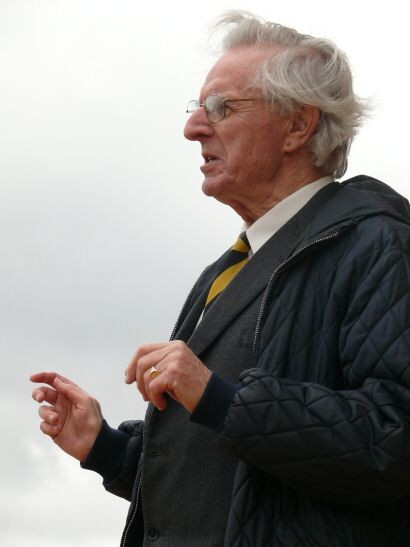
- Born: 25 June 1927; Rugby, Warwickshire, England, UK
- Died: 21 December 2020 (aged 93); Durham, England,
- Citizenship: British
- Education: University of Manchester
- Known for: Astronomer Royal; Cosmic rays
- Spouses: Audrey Darby (m. 1951–2007) Dorothy Middleton (m. 2015)
- Awards: FInstP (1958); FRAS (1973); Fellow of the Royal Society (1977); Marian Smoluchowski Medal (1992); Knight Bachelor (1995); Homi Bhabha Medal and Prize (2011)
- Scientific career
- Fields: Physics
- Workplaces: University of Manchester; Durham University; University of Ceylon; University of Hong Kong
- Thesis: The nuclear interactions of mu-mesons (1953)
- Doctoral students: George Efstathiou

14th Astronomer Royal
- In office 1991–1995
- Preceded by: Francis Graham Smith
- Succeeded by: Martin Rees

Sir Arnold Whittaker Wolfendale (25 June 1927 – 21 December 2020) was a British astronomer who served as the fourteenth Astronomer Royal from 1991 to 1995. He was Professor of Physics at Durham University from 1965 until 1992 and served as president of the European Physical Society (1999–2001). He was president of the Royal Astronomical Society from 1981 to 1983.

== Education and background ==
Wolfendale was born in Rugby, Warwickshire on 25 June 1927. His family moved to Flixton, Lancashire when he was 18 months. He attended Stretford Grammar School near Manchester. Wolfendale graduated with a Bachelor of Science in physics from the University of Manchester in 1948, followed by a PhD in 1953 and a Doctor of Science in 1970.

== Career ==
During his career he held academic posts at the universities of University of Manchester (1951–6), Durham University (1956–92), the University of Ceylon and the University of Hong Kong. He was Professor of Physics at Durham 1965–92, including a period as head of department, and remained an emeritus professor until his death.

In 1965, he was part of the team that first detected neutrinos at the Kolar Gold Fields.

== Publications ==
- Arnold Wolfendale publications in arxiv.org

Sloan, T.; Wolfendale, A. W. (2008). "Testing the proposed causal link between cosmic rays and cloud cover". Environmental Research Letters. 3 (2) 024001. arXiv:0803.2298. Bibcode:2008ERL.....3d4001S. doi:10.1088/1748-9326/3/2/024001. S2CID 18871353.

Wibig, T.; Wolfendale, A. W. (2005). "At what particle energy do extragalactic cosmic rays start to predominate?". Journal of Physics G: Nuclear and Particle Physics. 31 (3): 255. arXiv:astro-ph/0410624. doi:10.1088/0954-3899/31/3/005. S2CID 29495899.

Erlykin, A. D.; Wolfendale, A. W. (2006). "The anisotropy of galactic cosmic rays as a product of stochastic supernova explosions". Astroparticle Physics. 25 (3): 183–194. arXiv:astro-ph/0601290. Bibcode:2006APh....25..183E. doi:10.1016/j.astropartphys.2006.01.003. S2CID 119336059.

Myers, A. D.; Shanks, T.; Outram, P. J.; Frith, W. J.; Wolfendale, A. W. (2004). "Evidence for an extended Sunyaev--Zel'dovich effect in WMAP data". Monthly Notices of the Royal Astronomical Society. 347 (4): L67. arXiv:astro-ph/0306180. Bibcode:2004MNRAS.347L..67M. doi:10.1111/j.1365-2966.2004.07449.x. S2CID 53119165.

Myers, A. D.; Shanks, T.; Outram, P. J.; Frith, W. J.; Wolfendale, A. W. (2004). "Evidence for an extended Sunyaev--Zel'dovich effect in WMAP data". Monthly Notices of the Royal Astronomical Society. 347 (4): L67. arXiv:astro-ph/0306180. Bibcode:2004MNRAS.347L..67M. doi:10.1111/j.1365-2966.2004.07449.x. S2CID 53119165.

- Arnold Wolfendale publications at the SAO/NASA Astrophysics Data System

Bhat, C. L.; Issa, M. R.; Houston, B. P.; Mayer, C. J.; Wolfendale, A. W. (1985). "Cosmic γ rays and the mass of gas in the Galaxy". Nature. 314 (6011): 511. Bibcode:1985Natur.314..511B. doi:10.1038/314511a0. S2CID 4260315.

- Arnold Wolfendale publications in Google Scholar
- Arnold Wolfendale publications at Scopus (subscription required for more than 10)
- Royal Society

Bhat, C. L.; Mayer, C. J.; Wolfendale, A. W. (1986). "A New Estimate of the Mass of Molecular Gas in the Galaxy and its Implications". Philosophical Transactions of the Royal Society A: Mathematical, Physical and Engineering Sciences. 319 (1547): 249. Bibcode:1986RSPTA.319..249B. doi:10.1098/rsta.1986.0099. S2CID 120434925.

== Awards and honours ==
Wolfendale was elected a fellow of the Royal Astronomical Society in 1973, and a Fellow of the Royal Society in 1977. He served as Astronomer Royal from 1991 to 1995. In 1992, Wolfendale retired from teaching, and he was knighted in 1995. In 1996 he became professor of experimental physics with the Royal Institution of Great Britain. A lecture theatre in Durham University's new Calman Learning Centre has been named in his honour. He was an honorary DSc of Bucharest University and foreign member of the Bulgarian Academy of Sciences. His nomination for the Royal Society reads

Distinguished for his many contributions to the study of the cosmic radiation through a wide-ranging series of experimental investigations and critical analyses of cosmic ray data. Well known for his development of two novel techniques: the neon flash tube, a visual detector of great stability used widely in spectrographs and cosmic ray neutrino and quark studies, and the 'solid iron' spectrograph. Internationally recognised as the leading authority on muon spectra and charge ratios at ground level and at various depths underground in the energy range 5 x 10 [to the power of] 8-10 [to the power of 13] eV, measurements which are among the most basic data of cosmic rays. Measured the spectra of cosmic ray protons, neutrons and pions and from these data and the muon spectrum determined the primary spectrum and K/pi ratio. Results on the interactions of muons were of importance in a number of other investigations, e.g. in the Davis experiment on solar neutrinos. Introduction of the neon flash tube technique to the Indian and South African experiments on cosmic ray neutrinos was decisive and led to the clear identification of neutrino interactions and the determination of the cross section as a function of energy. Has established recently fine astrophysical groups in Durham which have already made useful contributions to the theory of the propagation of cosmic rays in the galaxy, to the explanation of the ultra-high energy end of the primary spectrum and to the origin of the gamma-ray background radiation. His optical group under Scarrott has recently obtained a beautiful map of the galaxy M82 in Rayleigh scattered light, and from it an accurate position for the luminous nucleus.

== Other activities ==
In 1992 Wolfendale became patron of the Society for Popular Astronomy and was a keen supporter of its activities. He opened Kielder Observatory, Northumberland in 2008, and was its Patron. In 2009 he was the 156th president of the Birmingham and Midland Institute. From April 2013, he was one of the two honorary vice presidents of the Society for the History of Astronomy.

== Personal life ==
He married Audrey Darby in 1951. They had twin sons. His wife Audrey died in 2007. He married anthropologist Dorothy Middleton, at Durham Cathedral, on 5 September 2015. Wolfendale died in December 2020 at the age of 93.
