= Hollywater =

Village in Hampshire, England

Coordinates: 51.099484°N 0.849852°W

- Location within Hampshire
- OS grid reference: SU8063033982
- District: East Hampshire
- Shire county: Hampshire
- Region: South East
- Country: England
- Sovereign state: United Kingdom
- Post town: Bordon
- Postcode district: GU35
- Dialling code: 01420
- Police: Hampshire and Isle of Wight
- Fire: Hampshire and Isle of Wight
- Ambulance: South Central

Hollywater is a small village in Hampshire, England. It lies two miles east to its nearest town, Bordon. The village is a crossing point to Whitehill to Liphook, and has the River Wey running through the village. The village itself is situated in the Woolmer Forest and has one Primary School.
