= Kielder railway station =

Former railway station in England

Coordinates: 55.2345°N 2.5890°W

Kielder

General information
- Location: Kielder, Northumberland; England
- Grid reference: NY626935
- Platforms: 1

Other information
- Status: Disused

History
- Original company: Border Counties Railway
- Pre-grouping: North British Railway
- Post-grouping: London and North Eastern Railway

Key dates
- 1 January 1862: Station opened
- 1 October 1948: Station renamed Kielder Forest
- 15 October 1956: Station closed to passengers
- 1 September 1958: Station closed to freight
Location

Border Counties Railway

Overview
- Status: Closed
- Locale: Roxburghshire, Scotland; Northumberland, England

Service
- Type: Heavy rail

History
- Commenced: 11 December 1855
- Opened: 2 April 1858
- Completed: 24 June 1862
- Merged into: North British Railway - 1860
- Merged into: London North Eastern Railway - 1923
- Merged into: British Railways - 1948
- Closed: 1 September 1958; (except Reedsmouth–Bellingham, closed 11 November 1963)

Technical
- Track gauge: 4 ft 8 1/2 in (1,435 mm)

Kielder railway station is a closed railway station that served the village hamlet of Kielder, Northumberland, England.

== History ==
Kielder railway station was on the Border Counties Railway which linked the Newcastle and Carlisle Railway, near Hexham, with the Border Union Railway at Riccarton Junction. The first section of the route was opened between Hexham and Chollerford in 1858, the remainder opening in 1862. The line was closed to passengers by British Railways in 1956.

The station had a single platform and a stone built station building in the form of two semi-detached cottages. A signal box was added in the late 1800s, causing the platform to be shortened by ten yards.

The station building, now two private houses, still stands near the 'Station Garage'.

Former Services

Preceding station	Disused railways	Following station
Deadwater	LNER; Border Counties Railway	Lewiefield Halt
