= Big Waters =

Nature reserve in Tyne and Wear, England

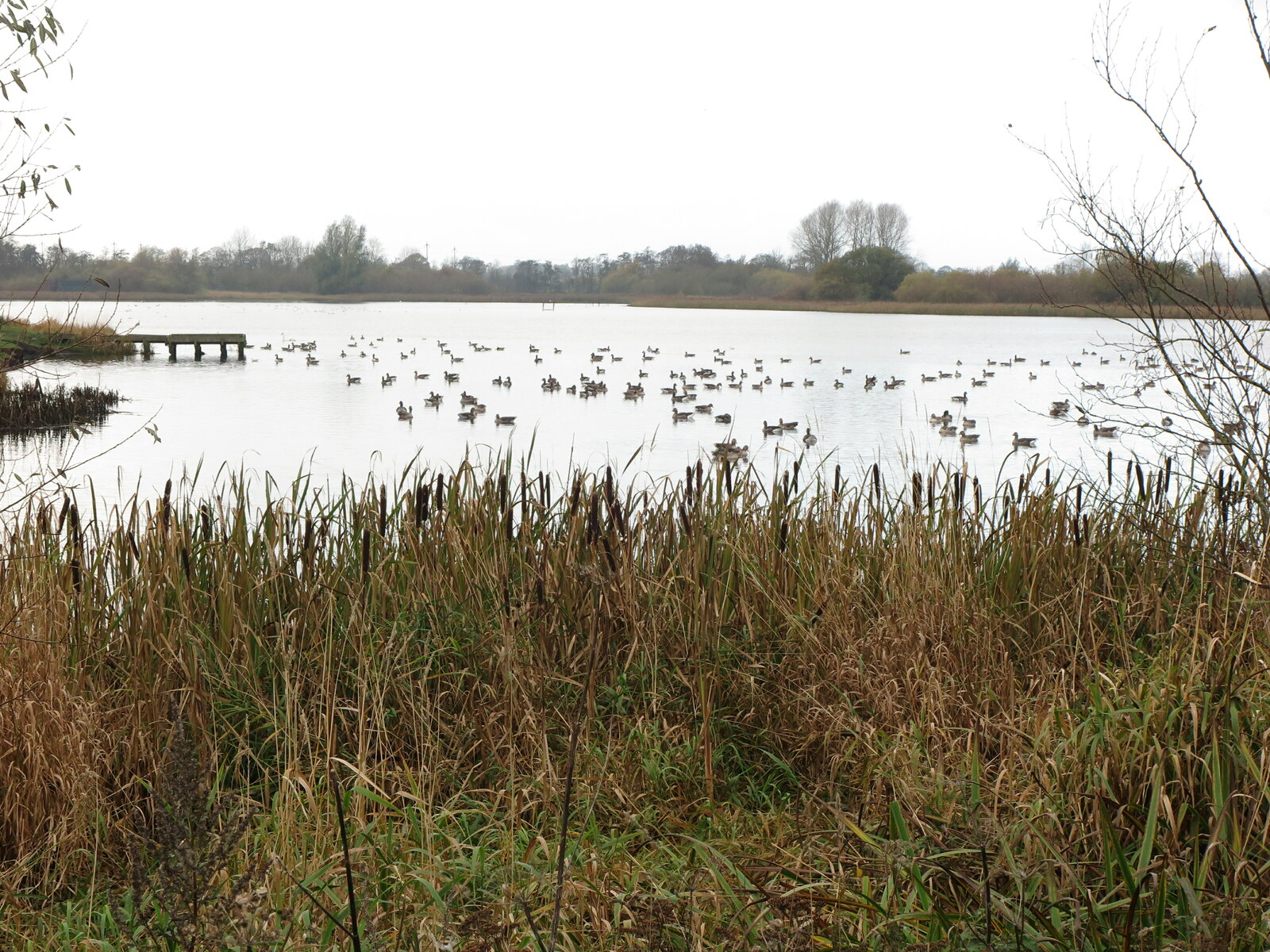

- Location within Tyne and Wear
- Location: near Brunswick Village
- OS grid: NZ 227 734
- Coordinates: 55°03′16″N 1°38′46″W
- Operator: Northumberland Wildlife Trust; Newcastle City Council
- Designation: Site of Special Scientific Interest

Big Waters is a pond formed after a mine collapsed and is now nature reserve in Tyne and Wear, England. It is the largest body of open water in the region, and is designated a Site of Special Scientific Interest. The eastern part of the pond is a public recreation area, Big Waters Country Park, managed by Newcastle City Council. The western part is managed by Northumberland Wildlife Trust.

== Description ==
The pond was formed by the collapse of mine workings from the 1920s along Hartley Burn.

The Country Park has a network of paths beside the pond. Fishing on the pond is managed by Big Waters Angling Club.

The western part is restricted to members of Northumberland Wildlife Trust. Since the water level varies significantly after rainfall, access around this part is on raised boardwalks. In this part there are two locked bird hides, available to members for a small fee.

=== Habitats and wildlife ===
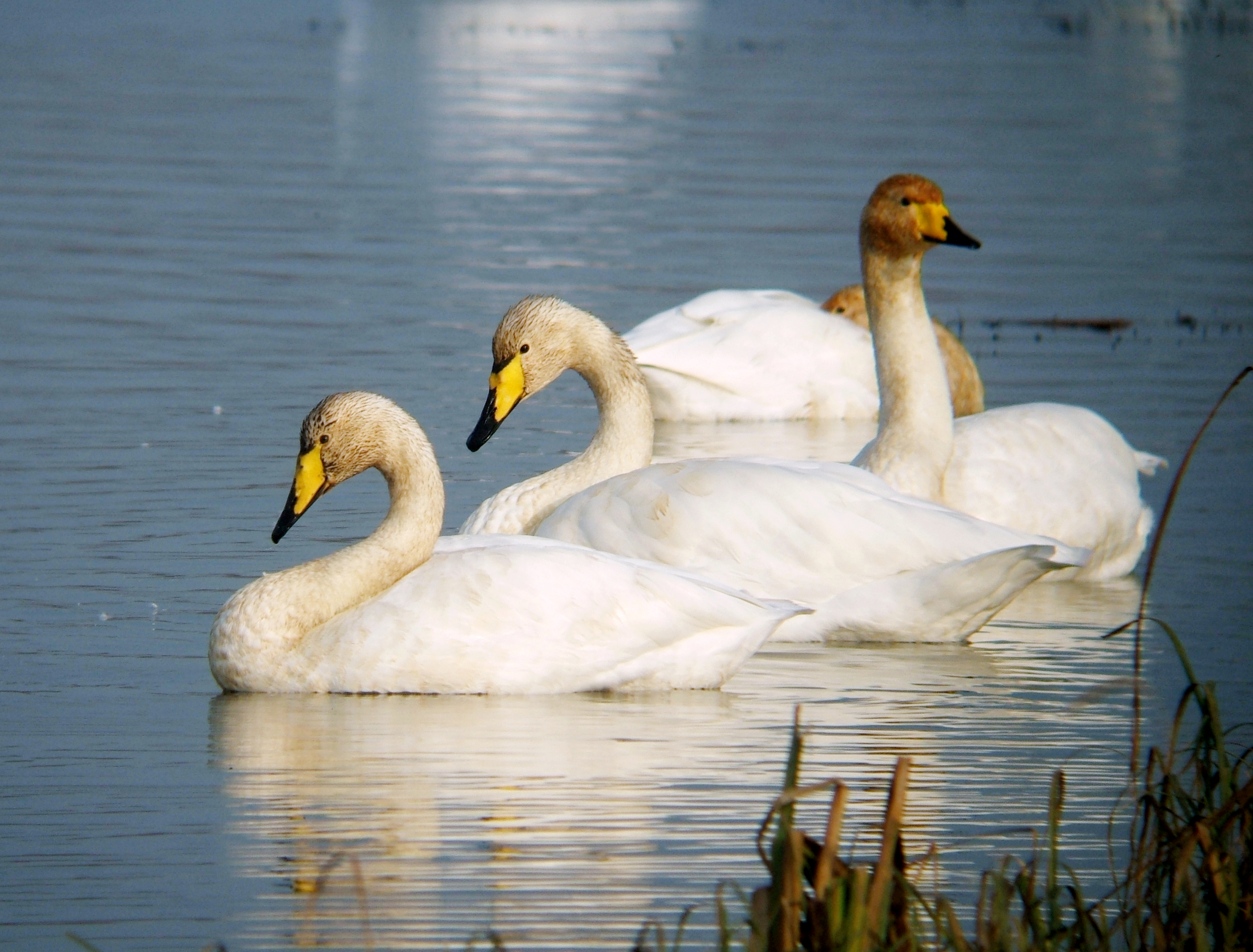
Whooper swans at Big Waters

There are distinct habitats, including fen and carr, and a wood planted in the 1960s and now maturing. There is a large colony of tree sparrows. Water birds include great crested grebe, mute swan, coot and moorhen, and occasional visitors including bittern and water rail. Migrating waterfowl are seen here during winter: these include Bewick's swan and whooper swan, white-fronted goose, goosander, teal and wigeon.
