= Thorneyburn railway station =

Disused railway station in Thorneyburn, Northumberland

Thorneyburn
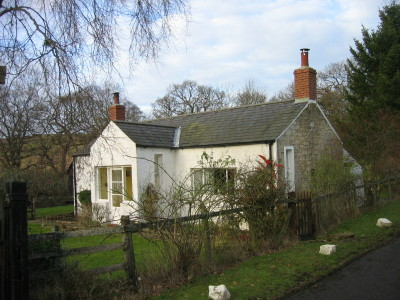
- The station building in 2005

General information
- Location: Thorneyburn, Northumberland; England
- Coordinates: 55.1709°N 2.3563°W
- Grid reference: NY774863
- Platforms: 1

Other information
- Status: Disused

History
- Original company: North British Railway
- Post-grouping: British Railways (North Eastern)

Key dates
- 1 February 1861: Opened
- 15 October 1956: Closed
Location

Thorneyburn railway station served the village of Thorneyburn, Northumberland, England from 1861 to 1956 on the Border Counties Railway.

== History ==
The station opened on 1 February 1861 by the North British Railway. The station was situated on a gated lane, at a former level crossing and west of Lanehead. The station was omitted from the timetable of 1 September 1864 but reappeared in the timetable of 1 October 1864 but with trains on Tuesdays only. A map from 1866 shows that the station had a siding and a goods dock but in the 1898 edition of the map, the siding was gone and the 1904 Railway Clearing House Handbook showed that the station never handled goods traffic. A full weekday service commenced from 27 September 1937. The station closed completely on 15 October 1956. By 1974 the platform had gone and the level crossing gates were replaced shortly after.

Preceding station	Disused railways	Following station
Falstone; Line and station closed	North British Railway; Border Counties Railway	Tarset; Line and station closed
