= Lewie =

Lewie is an English surname and male given name. Notable people with this name include:

- Jona Lewie (born 1947), English singer-songwriter
- Lewie Coyle (born 1995), English football player
- Lewie G. Merritt (1897–1974), American major general
- Lewie Gold, member of Captain Beyond
- Lewie Diaz, a fictional character in the Disney series, Stuck in the Middle
- Lewie Hardage
- Lewie Steinberg (1933–2016), American musician
