= Kielder Forest Star Camp =

Annual star party in Northumberland, England

- Organization: Kielder Forest Star Camp
- Location: Northumberland, England
- Coordinates: 55.237463°N 2.590853°W
- Altitude: 1200'
- Weather: Variable weather - clear dark night skies
- Established: October 1, 1998
- Website: Kielder Forest Star Camp

The Kielder Forest Star Camp is an annual star party, held each autumn and spring in Kielder Forest in northern England. The area is known for its dark skies.

The five night event is based on the Kielder Campsite. Free talks on astronomy are held at nearby Kielder Castle on the Saturday. The event started in October 2003.

== See also ==
- List of astronomical societies
