= Greystead =

Village in Northumberland, England

Coordinates: 55.163°N 2.354°W

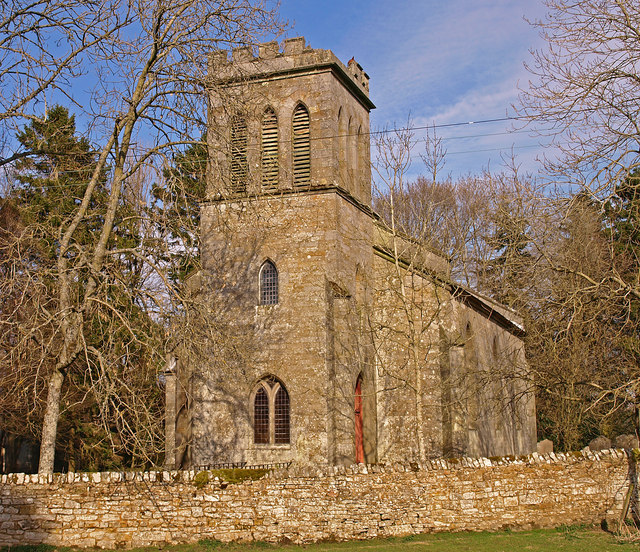
- The Church of St Luke

- Location within Northumberland
- OS grid reference: NY775855
- Unitary authority: Northumberland
- Ceremonial county: Northumberland
- Region: North East
- Country: England
- Sovereign state: United Kingdom
- Post town: HEXHAM
- Postcode district: NE48
- Dialling code: 01434
- Police: Northumbria
- Fire: Northumberland
- Ambulance: North East
- UK Parliament: Hexham

Greystead is a village and civil parish in Northumberland, England west of Bellingham. The population as of the 2011 census was less than 100. It shares a parish council with the adjacent civil parish of Tarset.

== Governance ==
Greystead is in the parliamentary constituency of Hexham.
