= Deadwater (topography) =

A deadwater is that part of an estuary through which there is little to no water flow.

In situations where a river flow is weaker than the marine processes that build sand dunes, the river may be obstructed from flowing into the sea by the formation of a sand dune; that is, a sandbar. In such cases the river will often form an elongated estuary in the swales of the dune. When river flow increases, or once the estuary has built up a large mass of water, it breaches the sandbar and flows out to the ocean. If this breach occurs at the farthest end of the estuary from the river inflow, then water must flow through the whole length of the estuary in order to reach the sea. Thus the entire estuary is flushed, and there is no deadwater. On the other hand, if the breach occurs near the river inflow, then most of the estuary will not be flushed by the flow of the river into the sea, resulting in a large deadwater.

== See also ==
- Liman (landform)
