= Falstone =

Coordinates: 55.181°N 2.435°W

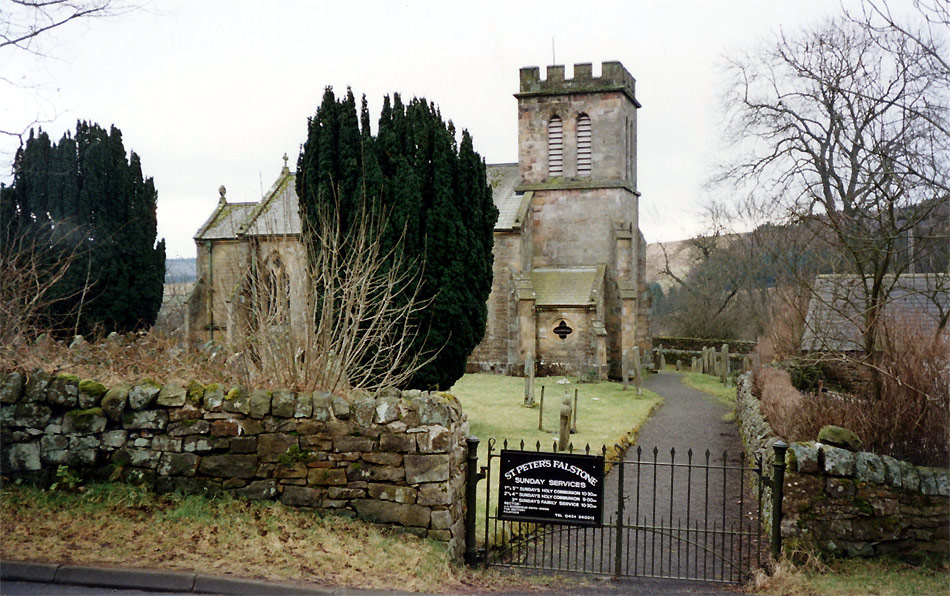
- The parish church of St Peter's, Falstone

- Location within Northumberland
- Population: 257 (2011)
- OS grid reference: NY723875
- Civil parish: Falstone
- Unitary authority: Northumberland
- Ceremonial county: Northumberland
- Region: North East
- Country: England
- Sovereign state: United Kingdom
- Post town: HEXHAM
- Postcode district: NE48
- Dialling code: 01434
- Police: Northumbria
- Fire: Northumberland
- Ambulance: North East
- UK Parliament: Hexham

Falstone is a small village and civil parish in Northumberland, England, just east of Kielder Water. The village is 8 miles (13 km) from the Anglo–Scottish border. Much of the village is clustered around its two churches, St. Peter's Anglican and the United Reformed Church.

Falstone holds a popular annual agricultural show.

== Etymology ==
The name Falstone is first attested in 1255, as Faleston. This derives from the Old English words fealu 'yellow, grey, mottled' and stān 'stone; thus it originally meant something like 'speckled stone'.

The district of Falstone also once contained a place called Powtreuet, first attested in 1325 as Poltrerneth, whose name comes from the Brittonic language.

== History ==
On 24 October 1985, near the village, Luftwaffe Panavia Tornado '44+45' of Jagdbombergeschwader 32 crashed, with two aircrew killed, taking part in 'Operation Mallet Blow', Hans Joachim Schimpf and Holger Zacharias.

== Governance ==
Falstone is in the parliamentary constituency of Hexham. Falstone has its own Parish council. Falstone parish was created in 1811 when the ancient parish of Simonburn was divided by Act of Parliament.

== Transport ==
Falstone was served by Falstone railway station on the Border Counties Railway which linked the Newcastle and Carlisle Railway, near Hexham, with the Border Union Railway at Riccarton Junction. The first section of the route was opened between Hexham and Chollerford in 1858, the remainder opening in 1862. The line was closed to passengers by British Railways in 1956.
