= Kielder =

Village in Northumberland, England

Coordinates: 55°14′03″N 02°34′58″W

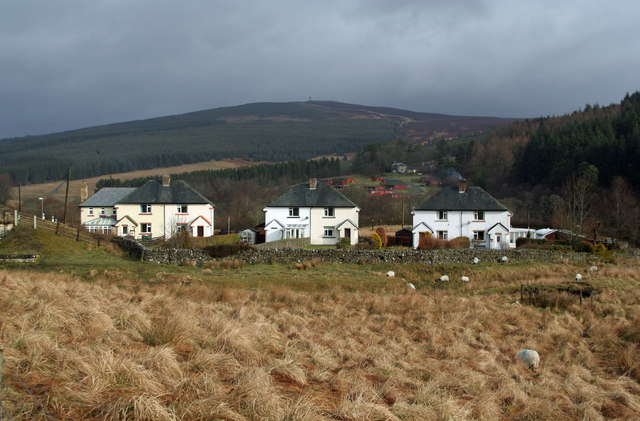
- Kielder Village, Deadwater Fell in the background

- Location within Northumberland
- Population: 218 (2011)
- OS grid reference: NY625935
- Civil parish: Kielder
- Unitary authority: Northumberland
- Ceremonial county: Northumberland
- Region: North East
- Country: England
- Sovereign state: United Kingdom
- Post town: HEXHAM
- Postcode district: NE48
- Dialling code: 01434
- Police: Northumbria
- Fire: Northumberland
- Ambulance: North East
- UK Parliament: Hexham

Kielder is a village and civil parish in western Northumberland, England. Located at the head of Kielder Water and in the north west of Kielder Forest, the village is within three miles (five kilometres) of the Scottish border. In 2011 the parish had a population of 218.

== Etymology ==
Kielder is thought to take its name from the Cumbric language, comprising words whose modern Welsh forms are caled 'hard' and dwfr 'water'. The name must originally have denoted a river, one of several in Britain called River Calder.

== History ==
There was early settlement around Kielder Castle, a hunting lodge built by the Duke of Northumberland in 1775. Previous settlements were expanded in the 1950s by the Forestry Commission who constructed housing to accommodate the workers employed in the planting of Kielder Forest. Most of this housing has now been sold back to the private sector.

== Governance ==
Kielder is in the parliamentary constituency of Hexham. Until 1 April 2009 it was within Tynedale local government district, but following local government restructuring in Northumberland the county is now covered by a unitary authority, Northumberland County Council.

== Geography ==
It is claimed that Kielder has the lowest level of light pollution in England – hence the construction nearby of Kielder Observatory. The Ordnance Survey recognises separately the villages of Kielder and Butteryhaugh. The two were linked by a 24-metre (79 ft) span road bridge constructed in November 1979 over the River North Tyne at its confluence with the Kielder Burn.

== Climate ==
As with most low-lying locations in the British Isles, Kielder experiences a maritime climate with cool summers and mild winters. There is a Met Office weather station at Kielder Castle. Since 1960, reported temperatures have ranged from −21.7 °C (−7.1 °F) in January 1982 to 34.0 °C (93.2 °F) recorded during the 2022 European heat wave. This record high temperature broke the previous record high by more than 5 °C (9 °F).

Climate data for Kielder Castle: 201 m (659 ft) 1991–2020 normals, extremes 1960–2019
Month	Jan	Feb	Mar	Apr	May	Jun	Jul	Aug	Sep	Oct	Nov	Dec	Year
Record high °C (°F)	12.9 (55.2)	15.0 (59.0)	21.9 (71.4)	23.6 (74.5)	26.6 (79.9)	28.2 (82.8)	29.7 (85.5)	30.0 (86.0)	25.2 (77.4)	21.1 (70.0)	16.5 (61.7)	13.5 (56.3)	30.0 (86.0)
Mean daily maximum °C (°F)	5.5 (41.9)	6.0 (42.8)	8.5 (47.3)	11.5 (52.7)	14.8 (58.6)	17.2 (63.0)	19.1 (66.4)	18.5 (65.3)	16.0 (60.8)	12.1 (53.8)	8.2 (46.8)	5.9 (42.6)	11.9 (53.5)
Daily mean °C (°F)	2.6 (36.7)	2.9 (37.2)	4.6 (40.3)	6.8 (44.2)	9.8 (49.6)	12.4 (54.3)	14.3 (57.7)	13.7 (56.7)	11.6 (52.9)	8.4 (47.1)	5.0 (41.0)	2.7 (36.9)	7.9 (46.2)
Mean daily minimum °C (°F)	−0.3 (31.5)	−0.3 (31.5)	0.6 (33.1)	2.1 (35.8)	4.6 (40.3)	7.5 (45.5)	9.4 (48.9)	8.9 (48.0)	7.1 (44.8)	4.4 (39.9)	1.8 (35.2)	−0.6 (30.9)	3.8 (38.8)
Record low °C (°F)	−21.7 (−7.1)	−18.3 (−0.9)	−17.1 (1.2)	−10.0 (14.0)	−6.1 (21.0)	−2.8 (27.0)	−1.7 (28.9)	−2.0 (28.4)	−3.8 (25.2)	−7.8 (18.0)	−11.7 (10.9)	−17.2 (1.0)	−21.7 (−7.1)
Average precipitation mm (inches)	170.7 (6.72)	136.7 (5.38)	108.7 (4.28)	88.6 (3.49)	84.7 (3.33)	85.4 (3.36)	99.9 (3.93)	111.7 (4.40)	98.7 (3.89)	142.2 (5.60)	152.0 (5.98)	170.3 (6.70)	1,449.6 (57.06)
Average precipitation days	18.6	14.7	15.3	13.6	12.8	12.4	14.2	14.5	13.5	16.6	17.9	17.3	181.4
Source 1: Météo Climat
Source 2: KNMI (extremes)

Climate data for Kielder Castle 201m asl, 1971–2000, Extremes 1960–
Month	Jan	Feb	Mar	Apr	May	Jun	Jul	Aug	Sep	Oct	Nov	Dec	Year
Record high °C (°F)	12.9 (55.2)	15.0 (59.0)	18.3 (64.9)	23.6 (74.5)	26.3 (79.3)	28.2 (82.8)	34.0 (93.2)	30.0 (86.0)	25.2 (77.4)	21.1 (70.0)	15.8 (60.4)	12.9 (55.2)	30.0 (86.0)
Mean daily maximum °C (°F)	4.8 (40.6)	5.4 (41.7)	7.6 (45.7)	10.4 (50.7)	14.2 (57.6)	16.5 (61.7)	18.9 (66.0)	18.5 (65.3)	15.1 (59.2)	11.6 (52.9)	7.6 (45.7)	5.7 (42.3)	11.4 (52.5)
Mean daily minimum °C (°F)	−1.1 (30.0)	−0.8 (30.6)	0.1 (32.2)	1.3 (34.3)	3.7 (38.7)	6.7 (44.1)	8.9 (48.0)	8.5 (47.3)	6.6 (43.9)	3.9 (39.0)	1.0 (33.8)	−0.5 (31.1)	3.2 (37.8)
Record low °C (°F)	−21.7 (−7.1)	−18.3 (−0.9)	−17.1 (1.2)	−10 (14)	−6.1 (21.0)	−2.8 (27.0)	−1.7 (28.9)	−2.0 (28.4)	−3.8 (25.2)	−7.8 (18.0)	−11.7 (10.9)	−17.2 (1.0)	−21.7 (−7.1)
Average precipitation mm (inches)	149.02 (5.87)	118.87 (4.68)	119.67 (4.71)	80.15 (3.16)	80.49 (3.17)	77.54 (3.05)	86.08 (3.39)	96.06 (3.78)	99.44 (3.91)	125.95 (4.96)	139.92 (5.51)	157.91 (6.22)	1,331.1 (52.41)
Source 1: Royal Dutch Meteorological Institute/KNMI
Source 2: World Weather Online

== Demography ==
The population of Kielder in 2001 was 207.

== Economy ==
The economy of Kielder has relied on forestry but now also incorporates tourism. Prior to the 20th century the economy of Kielder revolved around sheep farming. The use of the area as a hunting ground by the Dukes of Northumberland added an extra element to the area. Due to its location close to the border with Scotland, there was a black economy concerned with the smuggling of whisky from Scotland to England.

=== Forestry ===
The Forestry Act 1919 established the Forestry Commission with a purpose of forming a strategic reserve of timber for the country. The first plantings at Kielder were in 1926 when 800 hectares (3 sq mi) of coniferous trees were planted. A further 19,000 hectares (73 sq mi) were purchased in 1932 and today 62,000 hectares (239 sq mi) of forest are under Forestry Commission control.

Although timber production remains an integral part of the forestry operation, it also has the aims of encouraging the public to use the forest as an educational resource and to sustain and enhance wildlife conservation. Over 50% of the red squirrel population of England is now found in the forest.

=== Tourism ===
With the creation of Kielder Water in 1982 great strides have been taken to develop the area as a tourist destination with the establishment of facilities such as Leaplish Waterside Park by Northumbrian Water, which offers both accommodation and recreational facilities, the Kielder Observatory and various artworks in the landscape, such as the Kielder Skyspace.

== Transport ==
Kielder was served by Kielder railway station on the Border Counties Railway which linked the Newcastle and Carlisle Railway, near Hexham, with the Border Union Railway at Riccarton Junction. The first section of the route was opened between Hexham and Chollerford in 1858, the remainder opening in 1862. The line was closed to passengers by British Railways in 1956.

The station building, now a private house, still stands here by the 'Station Garage'. The station was renamed Kielder Forest in 1948. The Kielder Reservoir now floods much of the route eastwards to Falstone, but a very fine castellated viaduct near Kielder Castle still stands. About 1/2 mile (805 metres) east from here the line is obliterated as its route is now reservoir and some scouring and embankment removal has removed the traces of its course. Slightly further east its course would be below today's water level.

== Education ==
Kielder Primary School and Nursery is a community school in Butteryhaugh, catering for a small number of children aged 3 to 11. Its roots go back to 1849 when Algernon Percy, 4th Duke of Northumberland founded a school in the village. Northumberland Education Authority took over the school in 1939 and added two timber-built classrooms. From 1950 senior pupils were transferred to the newly built Bellingham County Secondary School. The school building is described as "new" in 1964 by headmaster, W.M. Brown in an article published in the Journal of the Forestry Commission. It was built under the auspices of Northumberland County Education Committee. Attached to the school was a three-storey community centre, containing a Northumberland County Library branch and reading room; the first floor had facilities for teaching art, woodwork and needlework. Between 2002 and 2015 the community centre building was utilised as Kielder Youth Hostel, but had been demolished by March 2020.

Children aged 9 to 13 attend Bellingham Middle School and from 13 to 18, Haydon Bridge High School. As the high school is a considerable distance away the option to board at the school exists.

== Religious sites ==
Kielder lies within the Anglican parish of Falstone with Greystead & Thorneyburn.

== Public services ==
Within the village there is a pub, shop, petrol station, garage and a post office.
