= Kielder Water =

Kielder Reservoir
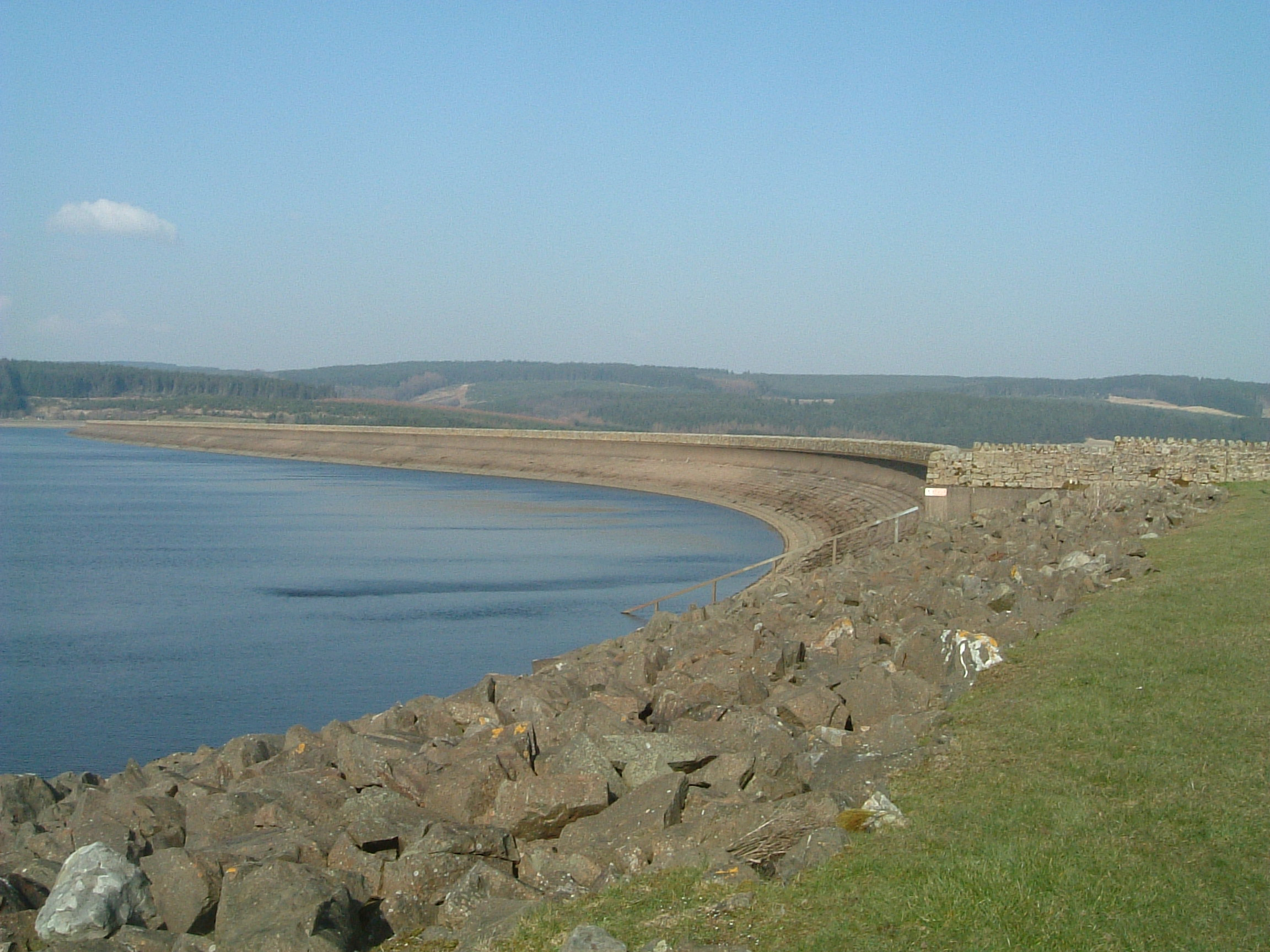
- Kielder Dam in 2007

- Location within Northumberland
- Location: Northumberland
- Coordinates: 55°11′N 2°30′W
- Lake type: reservoir
- Primary inflows: River North Tyne, Kielder Burn, Lewis Burn
- Primary outflows: River North Tyne
- Basin countries: England
- Managing agency: Northumbrian Water
- Built: 1975–1981
- First flooded: 1982
- Max. length: 5.65 miles (9.09 km)
- Max. width: 2 miles (3.2 km)
- Surface area: 10.86 square kilometres (2,680 acres)
- Water volume: 200 billion litres (44×10^{9} imp gal; 160,000 acre⋅ft)
- Shore length^{1}: 27.5 mi (44.3 km)
- Surface elevation: 184 m (604 ft)
- Islands: 1
- Sections/sub-basins: Bakethin Reservoir
- ^{1} Shore length is not a well-defined measure.

Kielder Water is a large man-made reservoir in Northumberland in North East England. It is the largest artificial lake in the United Kingdom by capacity of water (second-largest by area) and it is surrounded by Kielder Forest, one of the biggest man-made woodlands in Europe. The scheme was planned in the late 1960s to satisfy an expected rise in demand for water to support a booming UK industrial economy. But the decline of traditional heavy industry, together with more water-efficient industrial processes and better control of water supply leakage, served to undermine the original justification for the reservoir and the government-funded project has been criticised as a white elephant.

Kielder Water is owned by Northumbrian Water, and holds 200 gigalitres (44 billion imperial gallons), making it the largest artificial reservoir in the UK by capacity (Rutland Water is the largest by surface area). It has a 27.5-mile (44.3 km) shoreline, is 24.6 miles (39.6 km) from the sea, and has a maximum depth of 52 metres (170 ft).

== Etymology ==
The name Kielder was first recorded in 1309 as Keldre. Originating as a river name, Kielder may have the same origin as the various rivers named Calder, such as the one in West Yorkshire. The name may be derived from the Brittonic caleto-/ā, with the root sense of "hard" (Welsh caled), suffixed with -duβr meaning "water" (Welsh dwr).

Derivation from the Gaelic caol dobhar meaning "narrow stream" has also been suggested.

== Construction ==
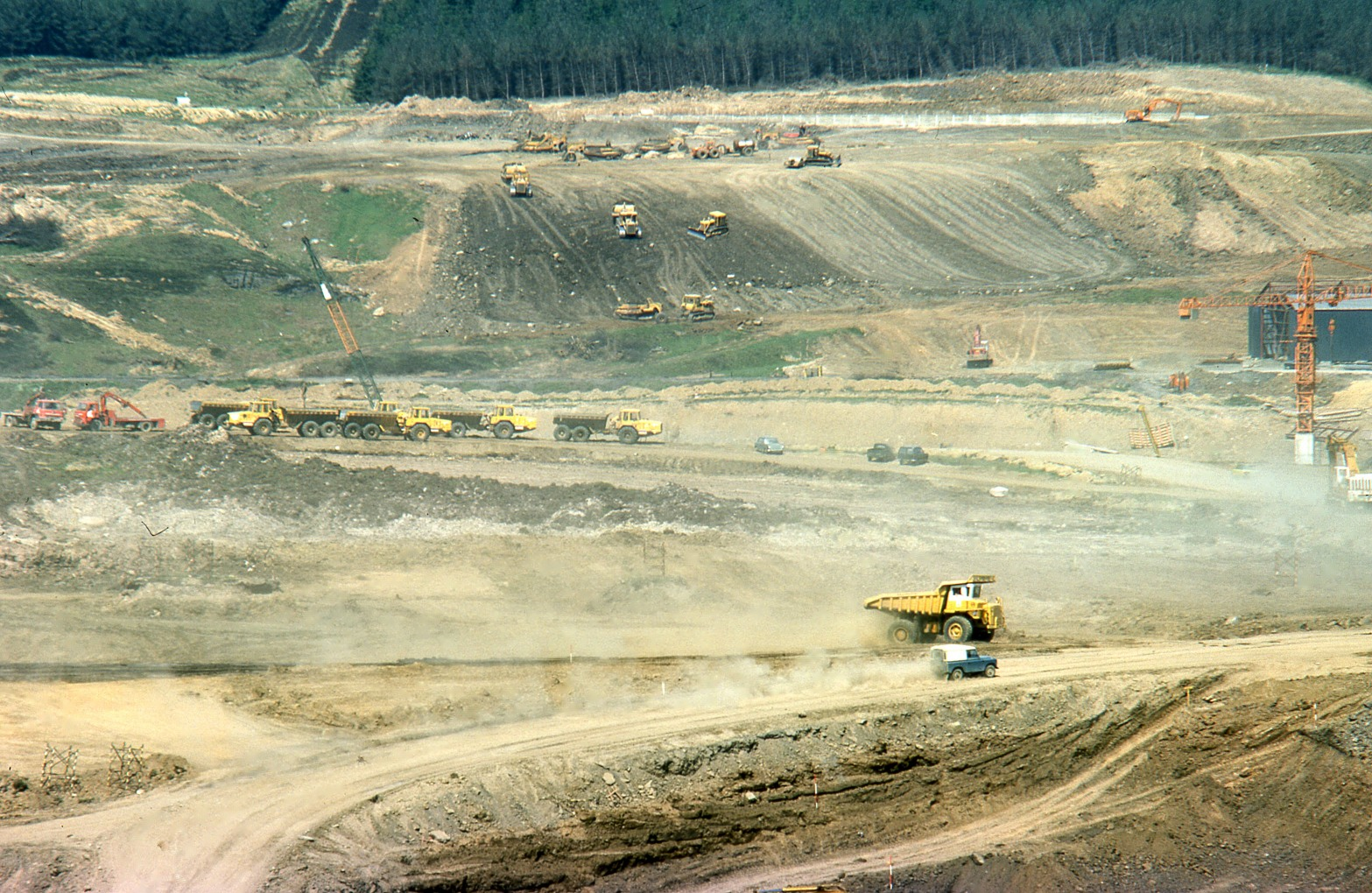
Kielder Water under construction in the 1970s.

After the scheme was approved by Parliament in 1974, work to build the reservoir and the dam at the hamlet of Yarrow in the Kielder Valley began in 1975. The reservoir and dam were designed for Northumbrian Water by consulting civil engineers Babtie, Shaw and Morton. Sir Frederick Gibberd and Partners were responsible for architectural aspects. Earth moving and infrastructure construction was undertaken in a joint venture with AMEC and Balfour Beatty.

The design meant the loss of numerous farms and a school. About 95 people had been resident in the area prior to its development. The former permanent way of the Border Counties Railway was also taken away through the development of the reservoir.

The scheme includes the smaller Bakethin Reservoir and dam at the head of Kielder Water.

Work was completed in 1981. Queen Elizabeth II officially opened the project the following year. The valley took a further two years to fill with water completely.

== Operations ==
The reservoir's purpose is to provide compensating discharges into the Kielder Transfer Scheme, where water can be transferred to the North Tyne, Wear and the Tees to support abstractions of water further downstream while maintaining minimum acceptable levels in the rivers in times of drought.

There are two main visitor centres at Kielder Water – Leaplish waterside park and Tower Knowe visitor centre – and other facilities at Kielder, Falstone and Stannersburn villages. It is also one of the region's major tourist venues, attracting more than 250,000 visitors a year who come to enjoy the facilities.

== Hydroelectric plant ==
Kielder Water is also the site of England's largest hydroelectric plant. It was opened by Queen Elizabeth II on 26 May 1982 and is owned by Northumbrian Water. In December 2005, RWE Npower Renewables bought the rights to operate the plant and sell the electricity generated by it, with a contract lasting until 2025. Following the takeover, the turbines were refurbished in 2005–2006, which increased the efficiency of the electricity generation. Controls were also updated, so that the plant can be operated from Dolgarrog in Wales.

The plant generates electricity using dual turbines which produce six megawatts of electricity. This comes from a combination of a 5.5 MW Kaplan turbine, which generates electricity when water release takes place, and a 500 kW Francis turbine that generates constantly from the compensation flow of water from the reservoir into the North Tyne. This gives the reservoir an average production of 20,000 MWh of electricity per year, a saving of 8,500 tonnes of carbon dioxide per year compared to fossil fuel based methods of generation.

== In popular culture ==
The area appears in the 2025 post-apocalyptic film 28 Years Later.

It is also the setting for L J Ross’ 2017 novel “Dark Skies” no 7 of the DCI Ryan series

== Notes ==
=== References ===
- McCulloch, C.S. "The Kielder Water Scheme: the last of its kind?" (PDF). University of Oxford.
