= List of places in Northumberland =

This is a list of places in Northumberland, in England. The area covered is the ceremonial county, hence the exclusion of places traditionally regarded as being in Northumberland which are now in Tyne and Wear for administrative and ceremonial purposes, for places in Tyne and Wear see List of places in Tyne and Wear.

== A ==
Abberwick, Acklington, Acomb, Acton, Akeld, Allendale, Allenheads, Alnham, Alnmouth, Alnwick, Alwinton, Amble, Ancroft Northmoor, Anick, Ancroft, Apperley Dene, Ashington, Aydon, Ayle

== B ==
Bamburgh, Bardon Mill, Barrasford, Bassington, Baybridge, Beaconhill, Beadnell, Beal, Beanley, Bearsbridge, Beauclerc, Bebside, Bedlington, Belford, Bellingham, Bellshill, Belsay, Beltingham, Benthall, Berrington, Berwick Hill, Berwick-upon-Tweed, Biddlestone, Bilton, Bilton Banks, Bingfield, Birtley, Birling, Black Heddon, Blanchland, Blyth, Bolam, Bolam West Houses, Bolton, Bomarsund, Bothal, Boulmer, Bowsden, Bradford (Adderstone with Lucker), Bradford (Belsay), Branch End, Brandon, Branton, Branxton, Bridge End (Sandhoe), Bridge End (Warden), Brinkburn, Broomhaugh, Broomhill, Broomley, Brownieside, Brunton, Burradon, Burton, Butteryhaugh, Byrness, Bywell, Bywell Saint Andrews, Bywell Saint Peters

== C ==
Callaly, Cambo, Cambois, Capheaton, Carrshield, Carter Bar, Carterway Heads, Cartington, Catton, Causey Park Bridge, Charlton, Chathill, Chatton, Chesterwood, Cheswick, Cheswick Buildings, Chillingham, Chollerford, Chollerton, Choppington, Christon Bank, Clennell, Clifton, Coalcleugh, Coanwood, Cottonshopeburnfoot, Collingwood, Colpitts Grange, Colwell, Corbridge, Cornhill-on-Tweed, Coupland, Cowpen, Cramlington, Craster, Cresswell, Crookham

== D ==
Dalton (nr Hexham), Dalton (nr Ponteland), Dissington (nr Ponteland), Duddo, Dunstan

== E ==
Eachwick, Earle, East Cramlington, East Ord, Eglingham, Elsdon, Embleton, Ellington, Eshott, Etal

== F ==
Fallodon, Falstone, Felton, Ford, Ford Forge

== G ==
Glanton, Goswick, Great Bavington, Greenhaugh, Greenhead, Gubeon, Guidepost, Guyzance

== H ==
Hadston, Haltwhistle, Harbottle, Hartley, Harnham, Haydon Bridge, Hazon, Hexham, High Angerton, High Buston, High Callerton, High Church, High Newton-by-the-Sea, Highfields, Holburn, Holystone, Holywell, Horsley (nr Prudhoe), Horsley (nr Redesdale), Horton, Housedon Hill, Housesteads, Howdon, Howtel, Howick, Hartburn, Humshaugh

== I ==
Ilderton, Ingram

== K ==
Kielder, Kilham, Kirkharle, Kirkwhelpington, Kirkley

== L ==
Langley, Linton, Little Bavington, Longframlington, Longhirst, Longhorsley, Low Alwinton, Low Angerton, Low Brunton, Low Buston, Low Cocklaw, Low Newton-by-the-Sea, Lowick, Lucker, Lynemouth

== M ==
Marshall Meadows, Meldon, Middle Ord, Middleton, Mindrum, Morpeth, Mitford, Murton

== N ==
Nesbit, Netherton, Netherwitton, New Bewick, Newbiggin by the Sea, New Hartley, Newton-by-the-Sea, North Blyth, North Charlton, North Seaton

== O ==
Oakwood, Ogle, Old Bewick, Once Brewed, Otterburn

== P ==
Pegswood, Pigdon, Ponteland, Powburn, Prudhoe

== R ==
Radcliffe, Ramshope, Red Row, Redesdale, Ridsdale, Riverside, Rochester, Rothbury

== S ==
Scremerston, Scots Gap, Seahouses, Seaton Delaval, Seaton Sluice, Seghill, Sheepwash, Shilbottle, Shipley, Snitter, South Beach, South Broomhill, South Charlton, Stakeford, Stannington, Stobswood, Stocksfield, Stonehaugh

== T ==
Throphill, Tranwell, Tranwell Woods, Tughall, Twizell Castle

== U ==
Ulgham, Unthank (near Alnham), Unthank (near Haltwhistle)

== V ==
Vindolanda

== W ==
Wall, Wallington, Wark on Tweed, Wark on Tyne, Warkworth, West Chevington, West Woodburn, Whalton, Widdrington, Whittingham, Wooler, Wylam

== Y ==
Yarrow, Yeavering, Yetlington

== Places of interest ==
- Cheviot Hills
- Churnsike Lodge
- Coquet Island
- Cragside
- Dunstanburgh Castle
- Farne Islands
- Hadrian's Wall
- Hexham Abbey
- Kielder Water
- Lindisfarne
- North Pennines AONB
- Northumberland National Park
- Prudhoe Castle

== See also ==
- List of settlements in Northumberland by population
- List of places in England
