= Unthank =

Unthank may refer to:

== Places ==
=== England ===
- Unthank, Dalston, Cumbria
- Unthank, Glassonby, Cumbria
- Unthank, Skelton, Cumbria
- Unthank, Derbyshire
- Unthank, Stanhope, County Durham
- Newtown Unthank, Leicestershire
- Unthank, Alnham, Northumberland
- Unthank, Haltwhistle, Northumberland
  - location of Unthank Hall
- Unthank, North Yorkshire, Yorkshire

=== Scotland ===
- Unthank, Angus
- Unthank, Dumfries and Galloway
- Unthank, South Lanarkshire
- Unthank, Moray

=== In fiction ===
- a city in Alasdair Gray's book Lanark

== People with the surname ==
- DeNorval Unthank (1899–1977), Oregon's 2nd African American doctor and civil rights pioneer
- DeNorval Unthank Jr. (1929–2000), son of DeNorval Unthank and architect
- Nellie Unthank (1846–1915), Mormon pioneer
- Valda Unthank (1909–1987), Australian cyclist
- Rachel and Becky Unthank, singers in the group The Unthanks (see below)

== See also ==
- Unthank End
- The Unthanks, an English folk group from Northumberland
- Intake (land), also known as unthank, a parcel of land
- Unthanks Cave, a cave in Virginia
