= Benthall =

Benthall may refer to:

- Benthall, Northumberland
- Benthall, Shropshire
  - Benthall Hall located there
- Dwinelle Benthall (1890-1931), American screenwriter
- Michael Benthall (1919–1974), English theatre director
- William Benthall (1837–1909), English cricketer
