= Newton Underwood =

Coordinates: 55.1689°N 1.7680°W

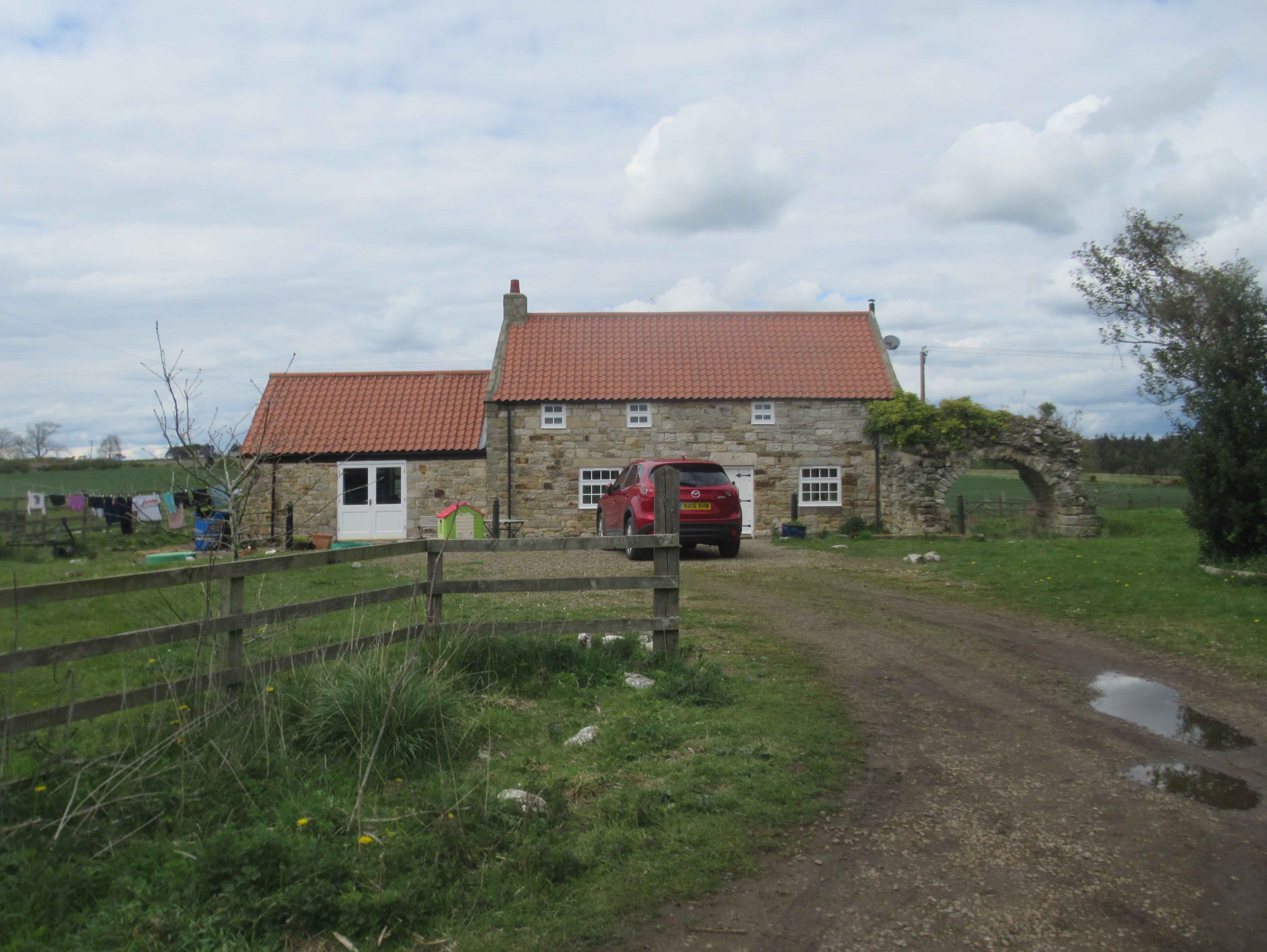
- Newton Underwood Tower

- Location within Northumberland
- Civil parish: Meldon
- Unitary authority: Northumberland
- Ceremonial county: Northumberland
- Region: North East
- Country: England
- Sovereign state: United Kingdom
- Police: Northumbria
- Fire: Northumberland
- Ambulance: North East

Newton Underwood is a hamlet in the civil parish of Meldon, in the county of Northumberland, England. It is about 5 miles (8.0 km) miles from Morpeth. There are the remains of a tower which consists of an arch in a wall in the north east corner of the village green. It was an ortalice or bastle of the family of Eure. Willey Reveley was born in Newton Underwood.

== History ==
The name "Newton Underwood" means 'New farm/settlement' under the wood and is Old English. Newton Underwood was historically a township in the ancient parish of Mitford, in 1866, the legal definition of 'parish' was changed to be the areas used for administering the poor laws, and so Newton Underwood became a civil parish. In 1894 Newton Underwood became part of Morpeth Rural District, on 1 April 1955 the parish was abolished and merged with Meldon. At the 1951 census (the last before the abolition of the parish), Newton Underwood had a population of 38. In 1974 Newton Underwood became part of Castle Morpeth non-metropolitan district. In 2009 it became part of the unitary authority area of Northumberland when the 6 districts of Northumberland were merged into 1.
