= 1995 Castle Morpeth Borough Council election =

1995 UK local government election

An election for the Castle Morpeth Borough Council was held on 4 May 1995. The Labour Party won the most seats, although the council stayed under no overall control. The whole council was up for election, and turnout was 47.4%.

== Election result ==
Castle Morpeth local election result 1995
Party	Seats	Gains	Losses	Net gain/loss	Seats %	Votes %	Votes	+/−
Labour	12					29.2		+7.3
Independent	9					29.4		+1.9
Liberal Democrats	6					24.0		-9.8
Conservative	6					16.4		-2.0
Other Parties	1					3.6		+2.3
Green	0				0.0	1.6		+0.3

== See also ==
- Castle Morpeth Borough Council elections
