= Birling =

Birling may refer to:

== Places in the United Kingdom ==
- Birling, Kent
- Birling, Northumberland
- Birling Gap, Sussex

== Other uses ==
- Birling (sport), also known as logrolling
- Birling family, in An Inspector Calls

== See also ==
- Birlingham, Worcestershire
