= Tom Voyce =

England international rugby union player (1981–2024)

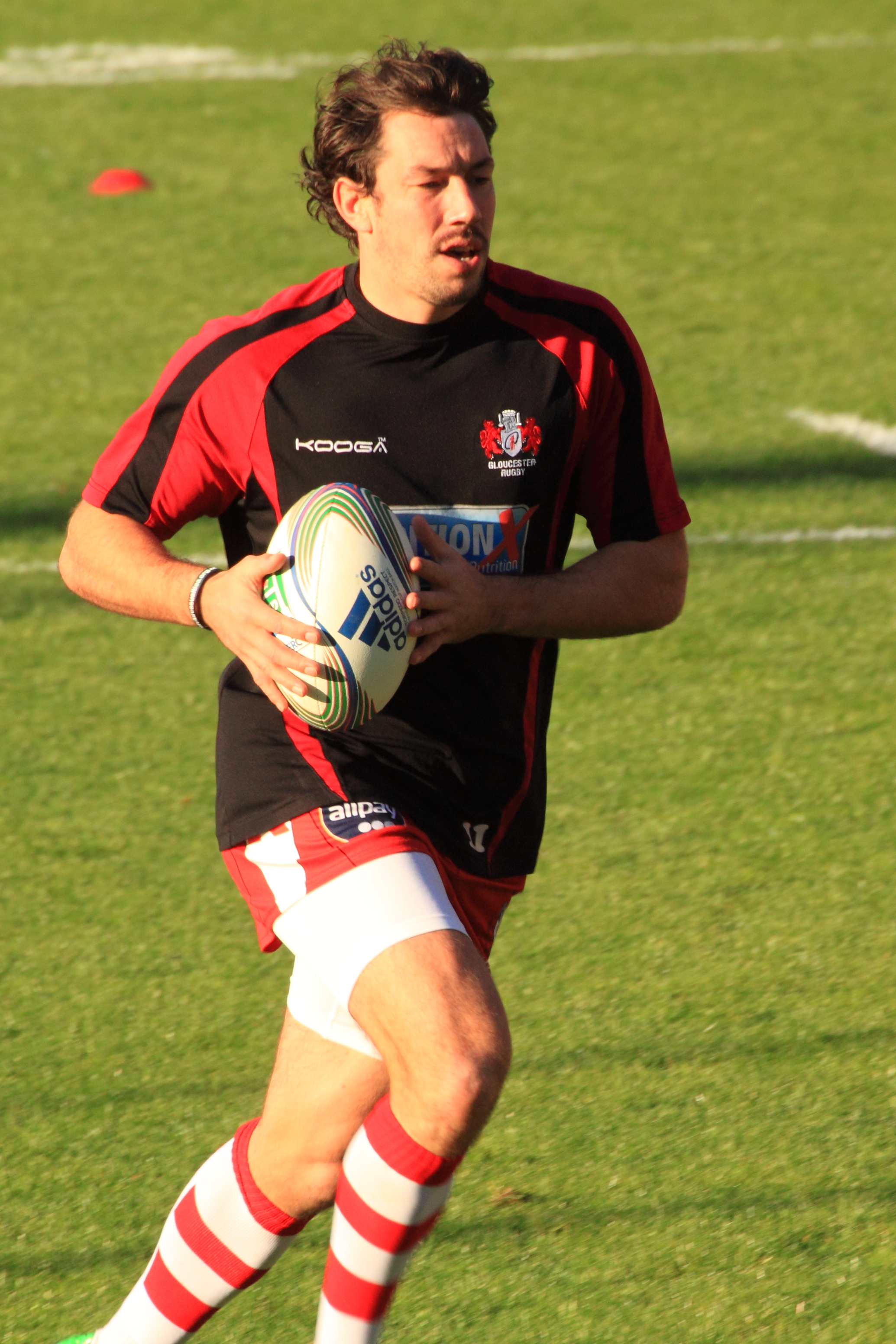
- Voyce in 2011
- Born: Thomas Michael Dunstan Voyce; 5 January 1981; Truro, Cornwall, England
- Died: 8 December 2024 (aged 43); Alnwick, Northumberland, England
- Height: 1.85 m (6 ft 1 in)
- Weight: 95 kg (14 st 13 lb)
- Notable relative(s): Anthony Thomas Voyce, great uncle

Rugby union career
- Position(s): Fullback, Wing
Senior career
Years	Team	Apps	(Points)
2000–2003	Bath	55	(75)
2003–2009	London Wasps	124	(215)
2009–2012	Gloucester	38	(40)
2012–2013	London Welsh	8	(0)
International career
Years	Team	Apps	(Points)
2001–2006	England	9	(15)

Thomas Michael Dunstan Voyce (5 January 1981 – 8 December 2024) was an English rugby union player who played at wing or fullback. He was capped by England.

== Background ==
Tom Voyce was born on 5 January 1981 in Truro, Cornwall.

Voyce's great-uncle, Anthony Thomas Voyce, won 27 caps for England, while playing for Gloucester Rugby, during the 1920s and was a member of the first double Grand Slam winning team. He went on to become President of the RFU in 1960–61.

Voyce was educated at Penair School, Truro and then studied at King's College, Taunton.

Outside the rugby field, Voyce was an Ambassador of the Wooden Spoon Society.

Voyce married Anna Wood in September 2015.

== Career ==
Voyce first showed promise playing mini rugby at Penryn RFC in his native Cornwall, before going on to play for Truro RFC U15s and U16s.

=== Bath 1997–2003 ===
Having left Cornwall at 16, Voyce eventually joined Bath where he worked his way through the club's lower sides and into the Zurich Premiership line up. At the same time he established himself in the England Under 21 side. He was selected for England's 2001 tour to North America, where he won his first cap against the USA.

=== Wasps 2003–2009 ===
In 2003 Voyce moved to London, to join Wasps for the 2003–04 season and quickly established himself as a first team regular. He played in 34 of his club's 35 matches that season, scoring 15 tries in the process. At the end of the season Wasps won the Premiership final against his former club Bath. He also helped Wasps win the Heineken Cup that season. In November 2004 he scored the quickest try in Premiership history when he gathered a loose ball from kick off and crossed by the posts in 9.63 seconds against Harlequins, beating Martin Corry's record by 14 seconds. Voyce was in the starting line up for the 2004 England summer tour matches against New Zealand in Auckland and Australia in Brisbane. He helped Wasps win their third consecutive Premiership title in 2005, this time scoring a try in the final against Leicester.

In 2005 he marked his first Twickenham Test appearance with two tries against Samoa.

Voyce was selected for every match of the 2006 Six Nations Championship. Initially selected for the bench in England's opener against Wales, Voyce quickly found himself on the pitch replacing injured Josh Lewsey, also scoring a try in the process. This injury meant that Voyce secured the number 15 jersey for the next game against Italy. However, Lewsey was soon fit again in time for the third game, which meant that Voyce was once again relegated to the bench. After losing two games in a row, changes were made to the England squad meaning England regular Lewsey was dropped, opening up the fullback position for Voyce to start against Ireland. Later that year, he played his last international against Australia, in Sydney. His performance in such game was – according to himself – quite poor, and this might have jeopardised his international career.

Voyce won his second Heineken Cup with Wasps in 2007. However injury ruled him out of Wasps' victory in the 2007–08 Premiership final.

=== Gloucester 2009–2012 ===
In March 2009, it was announced that Voyce would join Gloucester Rugby from the 2009–10 season.

In April 2012, his departure from Gloucester was announced.

=== London Welsh 2012–2013 ===
In October 2012, Voyce joined London Welsh.

On 16 May 2013, it was announced Voyce would retire from all forms of rugby with immediate effect. After retirement, Voyce worked at Investec Bank Plc.

== Disappearance and death ==
On the morning of 8 December 2024, Voyce was reported missing in Northumberland amidst flooding caused by Storm Darragh. He did not return home from a social event the previous evening, and his car was later found. Police said they thought he had tried unsuccessfully to ford the River Aln, and was swept away while attempting to escape from his vehicle.

On 12 December 2024, a body was found in the search for Voyce near Abberwick Mill, near Bolton, Northumberland, which was later confirmed to be Voyce.

In September 2025, the coroner ruled that Voyce's death was accidental after hearing that Voyce was almost three times over the drink-driving level and that he had probably mistaken the swollen river for a flat road.
