= Alnham =

Hamlet in Northumberland, England

Coordinates: 55.3915°N 2.0081°W

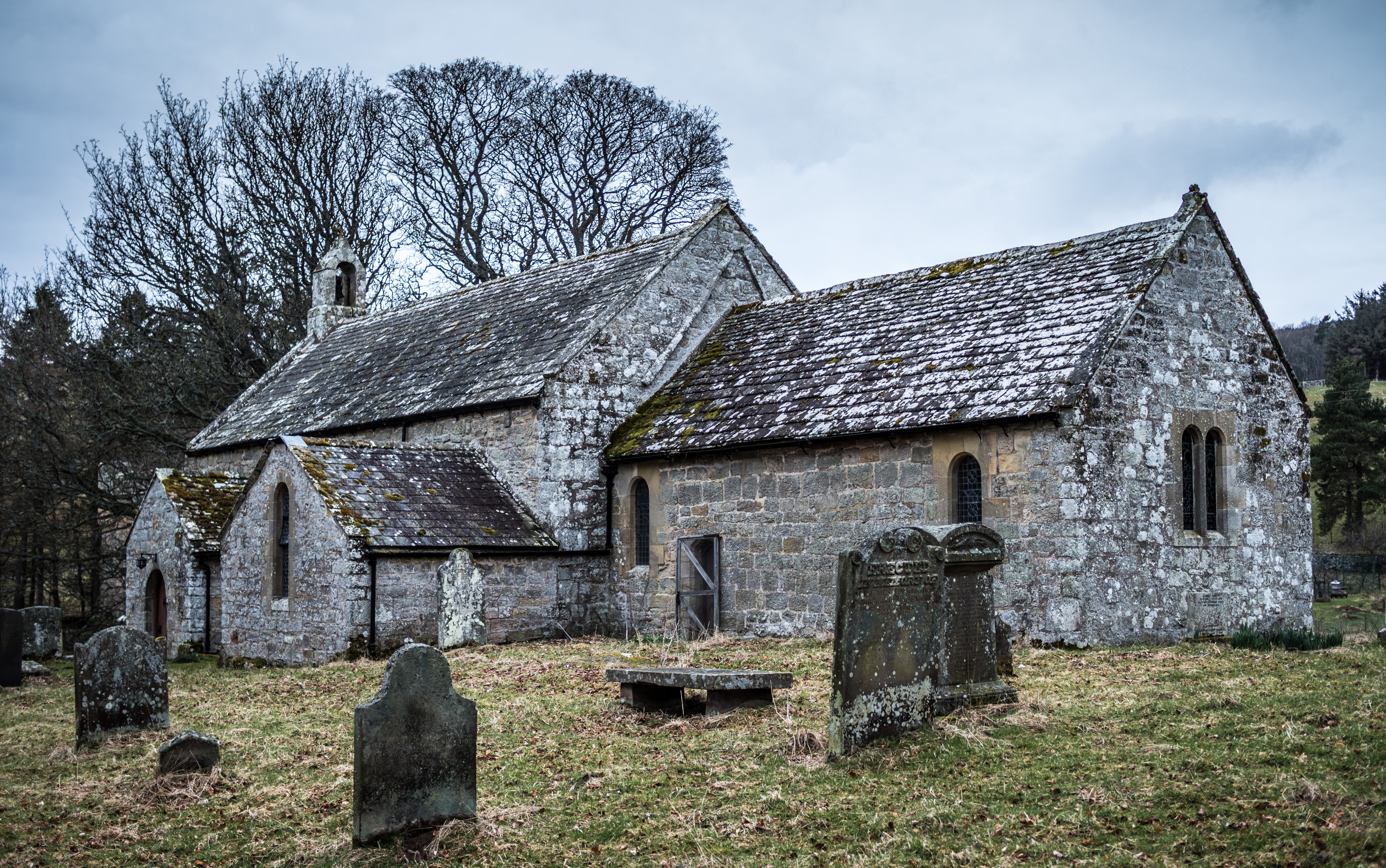
- Church of St. Michael, Alnham

- Location within Northumberland
- Population: 245
- OS grid reference: NT995108
- Unitary authority: Northumberland
- Ceremonial county: Northumberland
- Region: North East
- Country: England
- Sovereign state: United Kingdom
- Post town: ALNWICK
- Postcode district: NE66
- Dialling code: 01665
- Police: Northumbria
- Fire: Northumberland
- Ambulance: North East
- UK Parliament: North Northumberland

River Aln
Settlements

- Alnham
- Alnmouth
- Alnwick
- Lesbury
- Whittingham

Alnham (/ˈælnəm/, /ˈjɛldəm/) is a hamlet and civil parish in Northumberland, England. It is about 14 miles (23 km) west of Alnwick, and is about 6 miles (10 km) from the Scottish border, on the south of a small tributary of the River Aln. The village stands on uneven ground, sloping from south to north, at the foot of the southern outliers of the Cheviot Hills. The River Aln flows eastward through the village from its source in the Cheviot Hills down to the coast. The layout of the village appears to have been dictated by the river. The estimated population taken at the 2011 Census was around 245.

There is evidence of human occupation in Alnham and the surrounding areas dating from prehistoric times. The remains of a medieval settlement, hillforts, and other historic buildings can still be found in the village today. Due to its location, Alnham often suffered in the Anglo-Scottish border conflict during its history. The economy of Alnham has been focused on agriculture throughout its existence as a settlement.

== Toponymy ==
The name "Alnham" derives from the Old English hām (homestead) and the Celtic river-name Aln or Alaunos, meaning "homestead on the River Aln". Variations of the name have been recorded over time, including: Alneham (1331), Elnam (1509), Ayneham (1557), and Ailnham (1663). Alnham has also historically been called "Yeldom", and in the Magna Brittannia of 1724 it is mentioned as being usually called "Yarwell".

== History ==
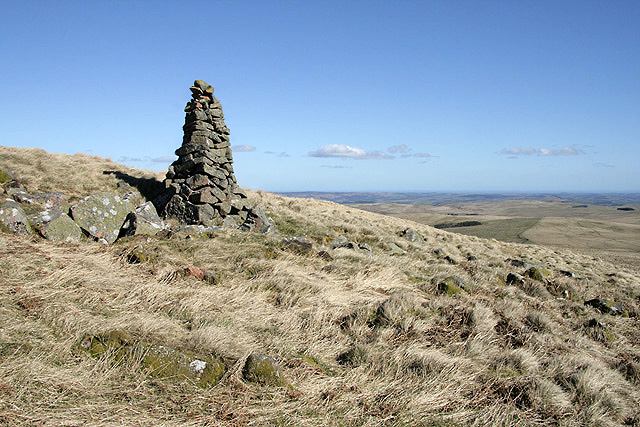
A cairn on Hogdon Law, to the north-west of Alnham.

There is no direct evidence of Paleolithic or Mesolithic human occupation within Alnham, although it is possible that the Cheviot slopes to the west of Alnham provided a wooded area perfect for seasonal foraging parties. The only evidence of Neolithic habitation is a cup-marked stone found at Alnham Northfield. Bronze Age occupation of Alnham is more evident. A rare bronze spearhead has been found at High Bleakhope to the north-west of Alnham, possibly indicating occupation by an elite social class. The remote and elevated location of High Bleakhope suggests that the spearhead was placed there as an offering to a deity. A number of cairns have been discovered in the surrounding area which may have been constructed in the Bronze Age. Unenclosed settlements, common in the Cheviots through the Iron Age and Bronze Age, have also been found in the surrounding area. Two Iron Age palisaded enclosures have been discovered on High Knowes to the north-west of Alnham. Castle Hill in Alnham is an example of a Cheviot multivallate hillfort and is likely to have existed by the Iron Age. Remains of hut circles within the inner closure suggest that Castle Hill was a settlement with a small population. Evidence of the Romans in the Cheviots, which is situated beyond the Roman frontier, is difficult to detect and distinguish from the Iron Age due to their limited cultural influence. The closest settlement to Alnham which is considered to be Roman can be found on Castle Hill.

During the Middle Ages Alnham was an important location, as indicated by its ancient buildings, castle mound, and pele tower. There is evidence that it was a populous village and reached its peak of prosperity in the late 13th century. The Church of St Michaels was first recorded in an 1184 charter in which William de Vesci granted Alnham and its tithes to Alnwick Abbey. During the reigns of Henry III and Edward I, Alnham was part of the lordship and estate of William de Vesci (in 1242) and John de Vesci (in 1289). In 1293 William de Vesci claimed free Chase in Alnham, but with no male heirs, his property was passed to Antony Bek (Bishop of Durham) after his death. Bishop Bek sold the Barony of Alnwick, which included Alnham, to Henry de Percy, 1st Baron Percy. From that point onwards, Alnham remained in the same descent as the rest of the Percy estates.

The history of Alnham was often troubled, including by climatic deterioration and harvest failure in the early 14th century, and the Black Death. These events caused the population to reduce significantly. In 1352, after the Black Death, there were 34 holdings, half of which were unoccupied. The surviving residents of Alnham, however, may have benefitted somewhat from this reduction in population and secured better rights: the Inquisition for Henry de Percy in 1368 reveals that the bondages and cottages were held by "tenants-at-will", in comparison to earlier non-contractual tenancies which owed labour services to a lord. Being situated in a precarious position between the English and Scottish borders, Anglo-Scottish combat also caused disruption in Alnham. Alnham suffered at the hand of Scottish raids during the reign of Henry VIII. Two letters from the Earl of Northumberland to the King, dating from October and November 1532, describe how the Scots came across the borders and rampaged Alnham and surrounding towns. The tower at Alnham appears to have suffered damage from the Scottish raids as it was reported to have been in a bad condition by 1541. The dangerous position of Alnham between the English and Scottish borders is again revealed in a survey of the manor from 1615, which reads:

the toune and manor of Alneham is parcell of the Barony of Alnewicke. The soyle thereof is good and fertile but the tenants have been greatly impoverished and disabled by the Scots and often English thieves by reason that the said toune lieth open to the great wastes between the two realmes.

Alnham was a significant agricultural centre in the early 17th century. Robert Norton's map of the Duke of Northumberland's Alnham Estate from 1619 reveals Alnham's meadowland consisted of four large common fields, 70 acres of arable land, and 168 acres of "Alnham oxe pasture". From the 18th century onwards, Alnham underwent a period of decay and transformation. In 1724, the Magna Brittannia described Alnham as being "pretty large". However, an undated map from pre-1750 shows a dwindling number of cottages, Seymour's Survey of c. 1756 records five cottages, and in the Enclosure Award of 1776 the village is recorded as having only two farms and three cottages. This decay can be attributed to the 17th and 18th century policy of leasing tenement lands to a single tenant, resulting in the amalgamation of land formerly owned by tenants-at-will into larger farmholdings. Transformation came about later in the 18th century: Alnham Common was first recorded in a survey of 1702 and was divided and apportioned in 1776. The grounds were divided up into holdings along the east and southeast sides of the township and a new road was built through the village. The Duke of Northumberland secured the largest share of the land: 1,379 acres of infield ground and 6590 acres of common. Further divisions of the land were granted to Alexander Collingwood, Charles Byrne, Percival Clennel, and the Vicar of Alnham.

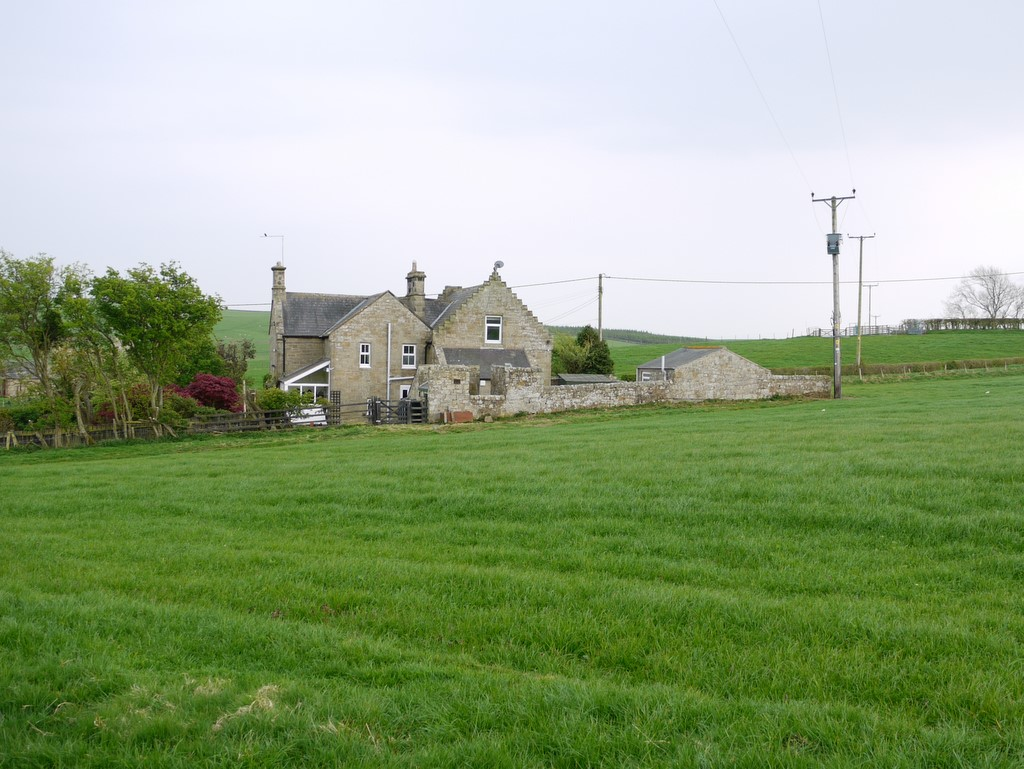
The rear of the old schoolhouse in Alnham.

In the 19th century, the village of Alnham consisted of three farms, a church, a vicarage, a Church of England school (constructed in 1870), and six cottages. Farming continued to be the focus of economic activity. By the late 19th century, Alnham Parish covered around 12,000 acres with the township of Alnham being by far the largest at 9535 acres. The population of Alnham in 1801 was 233 and remained relatively stable throughout the century, dropping to 205 by 1891. The 1831 census revealed that the majority of male residents aged over 20 in Alnham Parish was labourers or servants (45 men). A smaller proportion were employers and professionals (8 men), or "middling sorts" (15 men), which included small farmers and skilled workers.

The village did not develop much during the 20th century. The only new building to be constructed in this period was the War Memorial Hall erected in 1921. The population gradually declined owing to mechanisation and reduction in farming incomes.

== Demography ==
Alnham falls within the North Core Strategy Delivery Area of Northumberland – one of the least populated areas of England with 26 residents per square km, compared to the county average of 63. In 2001, the parish of Whittingham and Alnham had a total usual population of 505. In 2011, Alnham Parish had an estimated population of 245. 20.4% of residents were aged 0–15 and 10.2% of residents were aged 65+. 100% of residents identified as white. The majority of residents (68.6%) were Christian with the remaining population either having an 'other' religion, no religion, or did not state religion. 81.3% of residents aged 16–74 were economically active with agriculture, forestry and fishing being the most common industry (25.7%).

== Governance ==
Throughout its history, Alnham has been incorporated in various territorial units. In the medieval period, Alnham formed one of the manors of the Barony of Alnwick held by the Vesci lineage beginning in the early 12th century and ending in 1310. The Barony was then sold to Henry de Percy and remains in the hands of the Percy family today. The Parish of Alnham in the 19th century contained the townships of Alnham, Prendwick, Scrainwood and Unthank. These townships were recorded as separate localities in the feudal aid of 1242.

In the UK Parliament, Alnham is part of the Berwick-upon-Tweed Parliament constituency which has been represented by Anne-Marie Trevelyan (Conservative) since May 2015. Prior to May 2015, the seat was represented by Alan Beith (Liberal Democrats). In local government, Alnham is part of the Rothbury Ward and is represented by Steven Christopher Bridgett (Independent). At the Parish council level, Alnham is part of Whittingham Parish Council which comprises the former three separate parishes of Alnham, Callaly and Whittingham.

== Landmarks ==
There are seven listed structures in Alnham, including old buildings, the Church, and a medieval settlement.

Map of key features in Alnham

=== Church of St Michael and All Angels ===
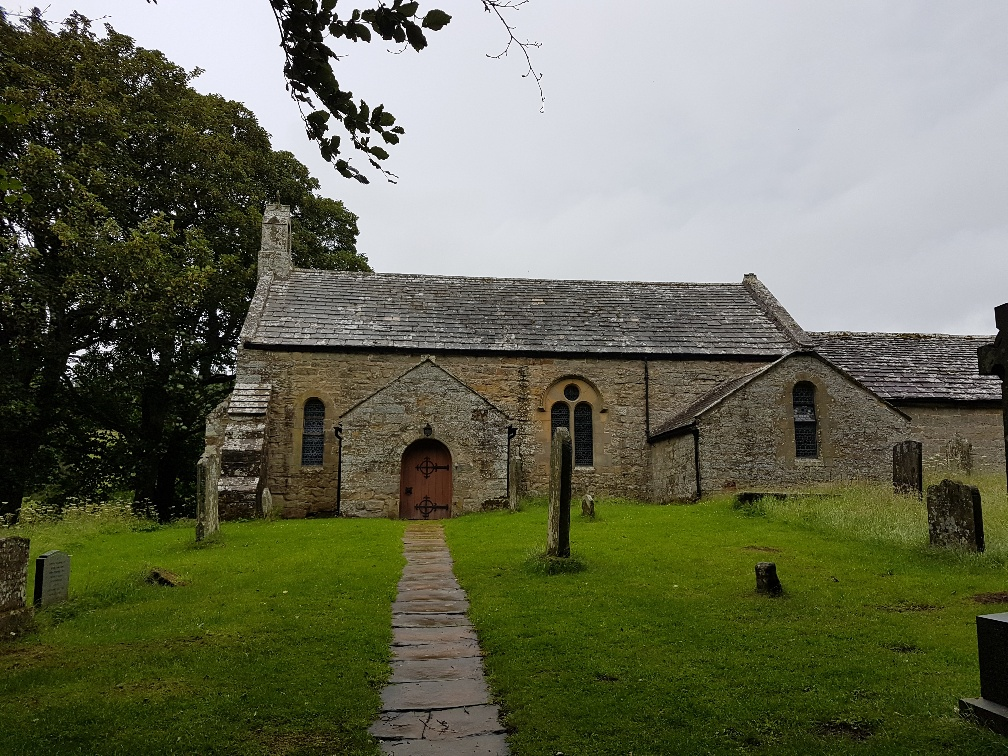
St Michael and All Angels Church, located to the west of Alnham village centre.

The Church of St Michael and All Angels is a Grade I listed building and part of the Diocese of Newcastle. It is a Parish Church of Saxon foundation located to the west of the village centre. The Church was first recorded in an 1184 charter. After William de Vesci gave the Church to Alnwick Abbey, a new west front, south chapel, north aisle, and chancel arch were constructed. It is likely that the Church was damaged in the Anglo-Scottish border wars in the 13th century. By the mid-13th century, the north arcade was replaced by pointed arches and the north aisle was widened. There is evidence that the Church was in a state of ruin at least once by the later medieval period. It was restored with a rebuilt chancel and a new transept arch. A further restoration was recorded in 1664.

By the mid-19th century, the Church had again fallen into a poor state. The Builder described the state of Alnham Church in 1862:

Open the rickety church-door. The eye is met by a green flash from the damp, mildewed walls, and by streaks of sky seen through the unceiled slates. The western end, with its Early Traditional single light, has not been much disturbed; but the rest of the window opening have been modernized and filled with common sashes, which are rotten, and let in wind and rain. The east end has a small square sash, such as is ordinarily provided for a scullery or any inferior office. Three of the worm-eaten, mousy pews are square, with a table fixed in the centre of each: a fourth forms three sides of a quadrangle that is occupied by a stove. Fungi abound, and the pavement is sodden with damp. Ruin is imminent, unless precautions are taken to avert it.

— The Builder, 1862.

F. R. Wilson, an architect from Alnwick, was responsible for the restoration of the building in 1870. All of the extant windows of the Church, other than those in the west end, are Wilson's. Further restoration work was carried out on the Church in 1953 by Gustav Adolph Renwick.

Around 20 yards (18 m) to the south of the Church is a medieval cross base which is a Grade II listed structure. It is a large stone, 2 feet (61 cm) high, with a socket cut into it to hold the shaft of a cross.

=== Tower House ===
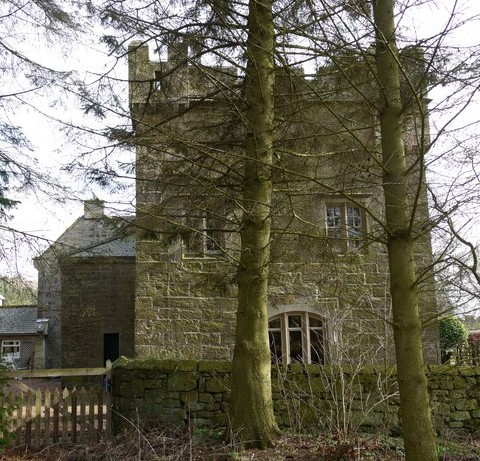
Tower House, also known as the vicar's pele.

Tower House, located near to the Church, is a Grade II listed building. It is also known as the vicar's pele and served as the vicarage of the Church for much of its existence. It was first recorded in Bowes and Ellerker's survey of 1541 and is listed as a "lytle toure". It was most likely constructed in the 15th or early 16th century. By the time of the 1541 survey, the Tower was in need of repairs, but there is no evidence to suggest it received the reparations required. The Tower collapsed in 1651 and a record of the building in 1715 reveals that its condition had still not improved. In 1828, Archdeacon Singleton noted that the Tower was uninhabited and uninhabitable. However, by 1844 the building was in use again. New battlements, corner turrets, window openings and a residential wing were constructed. Tower House was later used as a youth hostel and is now a private residence.

=== Medieval settlement ===
The medieval settlement at Alnham is a scheduled monument and is located to the south of St Michaels Church. The remains of this village exist as a series of earthworks between 0.3 metres (12 in) and 0.5 metres (20 in) high, a toft with an enclosure and two houses, a small hill, and a group of three houses and an enclosure. The settlement lies on two artificially-levelled sites. It is likely that the original medieval settlement was larger and more focussed on the Church.

=== Alnham Castle ===
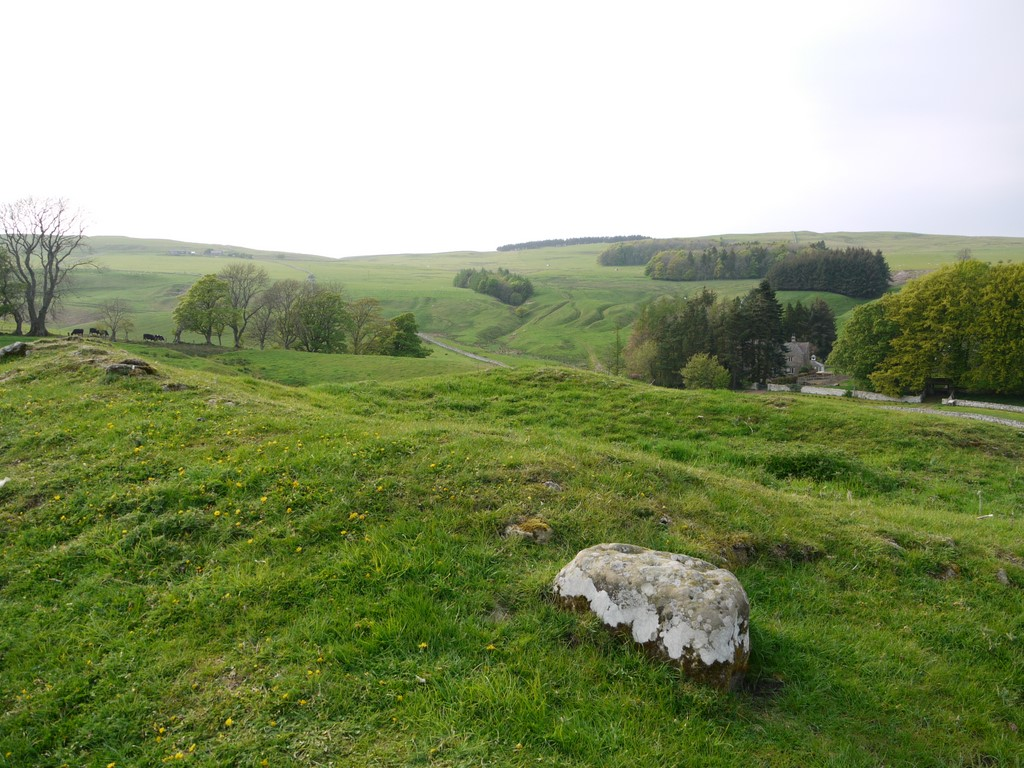
The site of Alnham Castle.

Alnham Castle is a scheduled monument that includes the remains of a medieval tower house. It is located to the south of site of the medieval village. The tower has a rectangular plan, measuring 22 metres (72 ft) by 18 metres (59 ft) and standing up to 2 metres (6.6 ft) high. The tower was first mentioned in 1405 when it is recorded as one of Harry Hotspur's strongholds which was surrendered to Henry IV. It is in a good defensive position on the summit of a low ridge. The remains of a small, triangular annex can be found to the east and south. An outer enclosure which surrounded the tower is represented by a well-defined lynchet bank to the north. This enclosure most likely consisted of a garden and meadow associated with the manor as recorded in the Inquisition of Henry de Percy in 1368.

=== Farm buildings ===
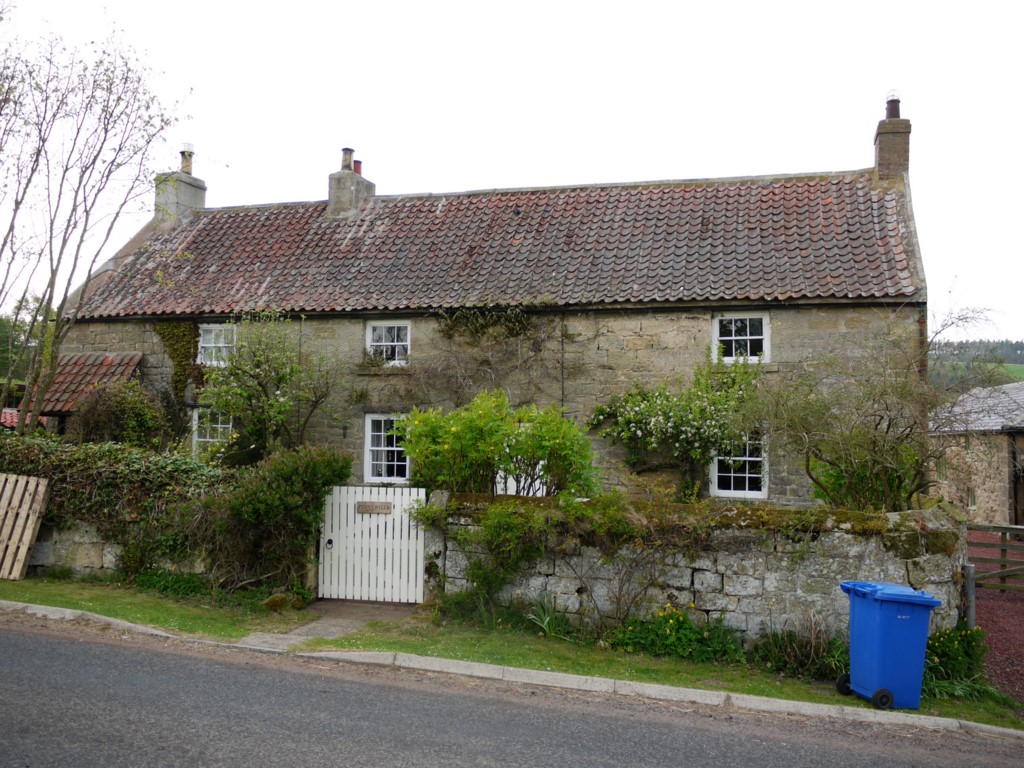
The exterior of Pennywells Cottage.

The former farmhouses of Alnham castle, previously known as Castle Farm, can be found in the village today as the Pennywells – two Grade II listed cottages. Dating from around the early 18th century, they are built out of roughly-dressed stone. The garden wall attached to the front of the Pennywells, also built out of roughly-dressed stone, is another Grade II listed structure. There are adjacent farm buildings, around 9 metres (10 yd) from the Pennywells, consisting of byres, a stable and shelter sheds which were built around a courtyard between around 1830 and 1840. The farm buildings have a separate Grade II listing.

=== Castle Hill ===
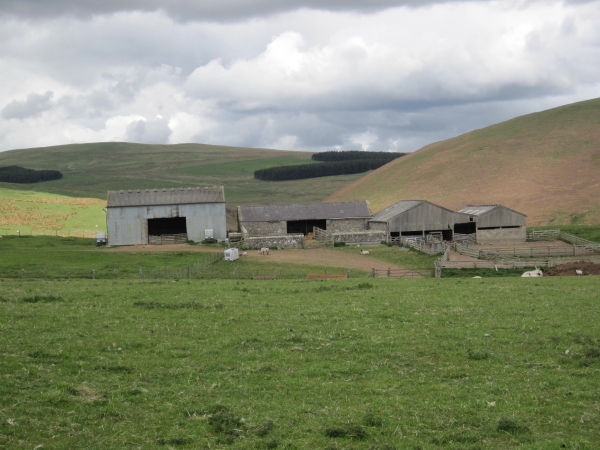
Farm in Old Hazeltonrig with Castle Hill pictured to the right.

Castle Hill is a rare example of an Iron Age multivallate hillfort. The hillfort has been designated as a scheduled monument and is located to the west of Alnham. It stands at a height of 289 metres (948 ft) above Ordnance Datum. It consists of a sub-circular enclosure within concentric ditches with ramparts which are built from earth and stone excavated from the site of the hillfort. The site also contains the remains of a Romano-British settlement. There are at least five hut circles within the interior of the hillfort. Three unenclosed huts on the north-west flanks of the hillfort, defined by a curving out bank, constitute the earliest of the remains, possibly dating from the Bronze Age. There were four possible phases of development of earthwork defences of the hillfort during the Iron Age. The first phase consisted of a univallate stone-walled enclosure, followed by the construction of the ramparts and ditches resulting in a bivallate hillfort (phase 2). Phases 3 and 4 saw Castle Hill become a multivallate hillfort.

Several trackways near Castle Hill potentially date from the prehistoric or Romano-British eras. There is also evidence of Bronze Age, Iron Age and Romano-British agricultural activity on the hill. Prehistoric cord rig was discovered on the north-west of the hilltop, and prehistoric or Romano-British ploughing has resulted in lynchets on the north-east side. There is evidence that medieval cultivation stretched from Alnham village and stopped at a boundary bank to the south-east face of the hill.

=== War Memorial Hall ===
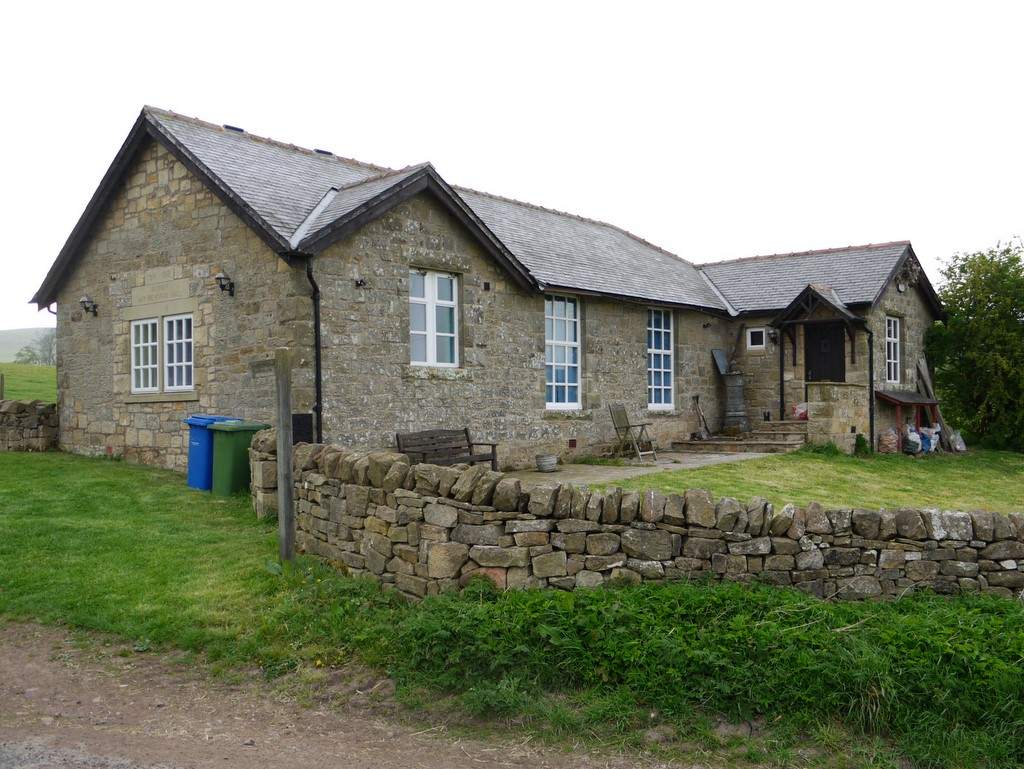
Alnham War Memorial Hall.

The most significant structure to be built in Alnham in the 20th century is the War Memorial Hall, erected in 1920 as a testament to the impact of World War I on small rural communities like Alnham. It is a stone-built village hall with a stone incision above the porch door. There are no names inscribed on the memorial as there were no deaths in the village during the war.

== Transport ==
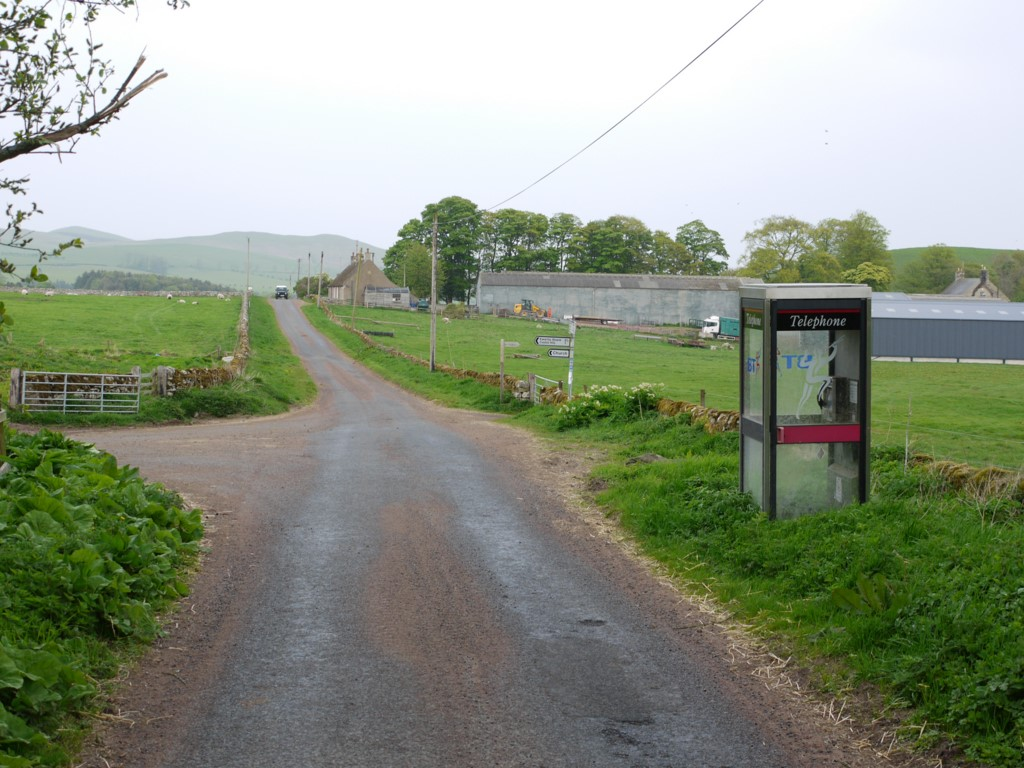
Road junction in the centre of Alnham.

Alnham is an isolated rural community. The nearest main road is the A697, around 7.5 miles (12 km) away. The village is situated on a local road running north-south from Prendwick to Scrainwood; from a junction near the village centre another road heads northwest from Alnham, past Castle Hill, for about 5 kilometres (3.1 mi) to Ewartly Shank, where it ends.

There were plans in the mid-to-late 19th century for a Northumberland Central Railway line to run through Alnham. The proposed railway would have been located to the east of Pennylaws Cottage, but it was never built.
