= Scrainwood =

Hamlet in Northumberland, England

Coordinates: 55.379548°N 2.0175841°W

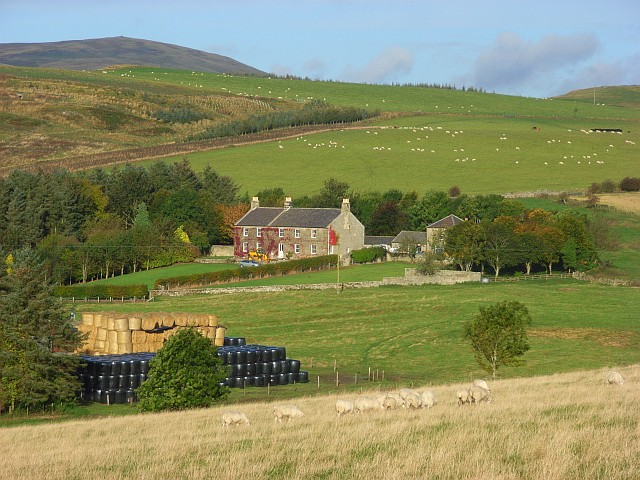

- Location within Northumberland
- Civil parish: Alnham
- Unitary authority: Northumberland
- Ceremonial county: Northumberland
- Region: North East
- Country: England
- Sovereign state: United Kingdom
- Police: Northumbria
- Fire: Northumberland
- Ambulance: North East

Scrainwood is a hamlet and former civil parish 20 miles (32 km) from Morpeth, now in the parish of Alnham, in the county of Northumberland, England. In 1951 the parish had a population of 16. Scrainwood Estate is 1048 acres and has a shoot that specializes in partridges.

== History ==
The name "Scrainwood" is uncertain and may mean 'shrew-mouse wood' or 'villain wood' or it could mean 'hollow-place wood'. Until 1509 Scrainwood manor was in William Vescy's barony. Scrainwood is a deserted medieval village that appeared to have declined in the 15 or 16th century. There are earthwork remains of at least 3 probable house platforms. Names recorded include Screnwood, Scenwood, Screenwood, Skrynwood, Scranwood, Screynwood, Scrynwood and Skranwoo. Scrainwood was a township in Alnham parish. From 1866 Scrainwood was a civil parish in its own right until it was merged with Alnham on 1 April 1955.
