= Adderstone =

Village in Northumberland, England

Coordinates: 55.567°N 1.782°W

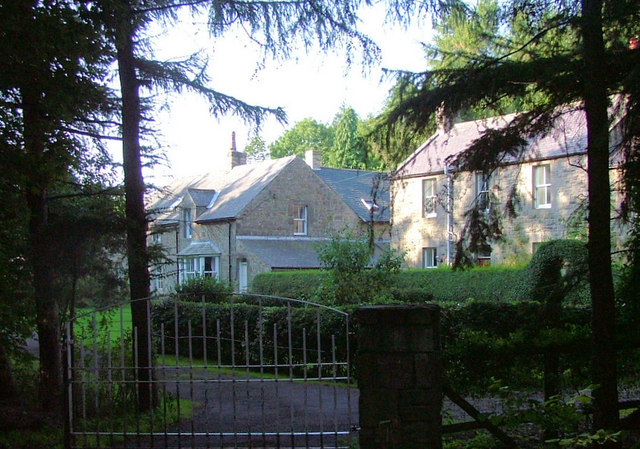
- Houses by Adderstone Hall

- Location within Northumberland
- OS grid reference: NU138303
- Civil parish: Adderstone with Lucker
- Unitary authority: Northumberland
- Shire county: Northumberland
- Region: North East
- Country: England
- Sovereign state: United Kingdom
- Post town: BELFORD
- Postcode district: NE70
- Police: Northumbria
- Fire: Northumberland
- Ambulance: North East
- UK Parliament: Berwick-upon-Tweed

Adderstone is a village in the civil parish of Adderstone with Lucker, in Northumberland, England.

== History ==
The name "Adderstone" means 'Eadred's farm/settlement'.

Adderstone was formerly a township in the parish of Bamburgh. From the 17th century onwards, the township exercised parish functions under the poor laws. Adderstone therefore became a separate civil parish in 1866 when the legal definition of 'parish' was changed to be the areas used for administering the poor laws. The parish of Adderstone was abolished on 1 April 1955 to form Adderstone with Lucker. At the 1951 census (the last before the abolition of the civil parish), Adderstone had a population of 185.

== Governance ==
Adderstone is in the parliamentary constituency of Berwick-upon-Tweed.
