= Adderstone with Lucker =

Civil parish in Northumberland, England

Coordinates: 55.567°N 1.782°W

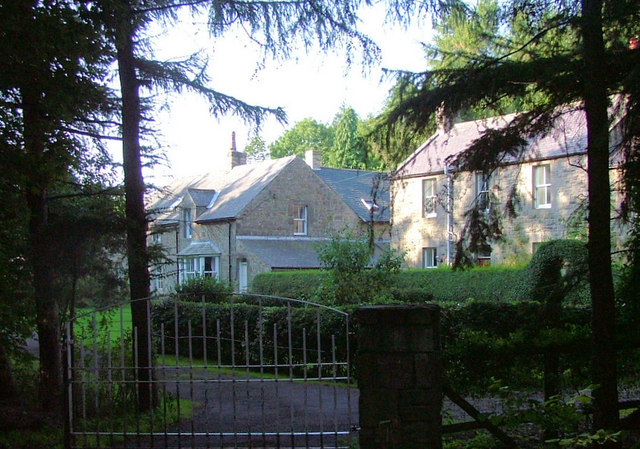
- Adderstone Hall

- Location within Northumberland
- Population: 195 (2001 census)
- OS grid reference: NU138303
- Civil parish: Adderstone with Lucker
- Unitary authority: Northumberland
- Ceremonial county: Northumberland
- Region: North East
- Country: England
- Sovereign state: United Kingdom
- Post town: Belford
- Postcode district: NE70
- Police: Northumbria
- Fire: Northumberland
- Ambulance: North East

Adderstone with Lucker is a civil parish in Northumberland, England. The parish includes the villages of Adderstone, Lucker, Warenford, Rosebrough, Newstead, Bellshill and Bradford, and has a population (2001) of 195. increasing to 238 at the 2011 Census.

== History ==
The parish was formed on 1 April 1955 from the parishes of Adderstone, Bradford, Lucker, Newstead, Ratchwood and Warenford.
