= Tom Voyce (rugby union, born 1897) =

British Isles & England international rugby union player

Tom Voyce OBE
- Born: Anthony Thomas Voyce; 18 May 1897 Gloucester, England
- Died: 22 January 1980 (aged 82) Gloucester, England
- School: National School, Gloucester
- Notable relative(s): Thomas Michael Dunstan Voyce, great nephew

Rugby union career
- Position: Flanker
Senior career
Years	Team	Apps	(Points)
1919–1927	Gloucester RFC	171	(219)
International career
Years	Team	Apps	(Points)
1920–1926	England	29	(21)
1924	British Isles	2	(6)

Anthony Thomas Voyce OBE (18 May 1897 – 22 January 1980) was an English rugby union player who played in the flanker position. Voyce played club rugby with Gloucester RFC, was capped 29 times for England, and was a member of the British Isles team that toured in 1924.

== Early life ==
Voyce was born in Gloucester on 18 May 1897, to Thomas and Annie Voyce. Voyce was a student at the National School, Gloucester where he took up the game of rugby. Appearances for Gloucester schoolboys resulted in interest from the England national team, with Voyce playing in a trial game in February 1911, leading to an appearance for the England Under-15 team against Wales in March 1911.

== Playing career ==
His senior Gloucester debut came in December 1919, and was followed in short succession by his first appearance for the Gloucestershire county team in January 1920 and his first England cap in February 1920 against Ireland in the Five Nations Championship.

He played in every game during the England's three Grand Slam victories in the Five Nations Championship in 1921, 1923 and 1924.

A sole appearance for the Barbarians invitational team came on 19 April 1924 against Cardiff. Voyce was announced as a member of the British Isles team to tour South Africa, and played in 12 games during the tour, including two of the four test matches against South Africa. Initially overlooked as a test player, Voyce played his way into the side and took over kicking duties, ending as the tour's top points scorer with 37 points. His versatility saw appearances as a wing and full-back to cover injuries, as well as his usual position in the back row.

Voyce was made Gloucester's club captain ahead of the 1924–25 season, a role he held for three seasons. His final appearance as a player for Gloucester was in November 1927.

== Post-playing rugby career ==
Following his retirement from playing, he held a number of administrative roles, including as President of the Rugby Football Union from 1960 to 1961. He was President of Gloucester RFC between 1970 and 1978. In the 1962 New Year Honours, Voyce was appointed an Officer of the Order of the British Empire (OBE) "for services to sport and for public services in Gloucestershire".
