= Bradford, Adderstone with Lucker =

Village in Northumberland, England

Coordinates: 55.586°N 1.756°W

Bradford
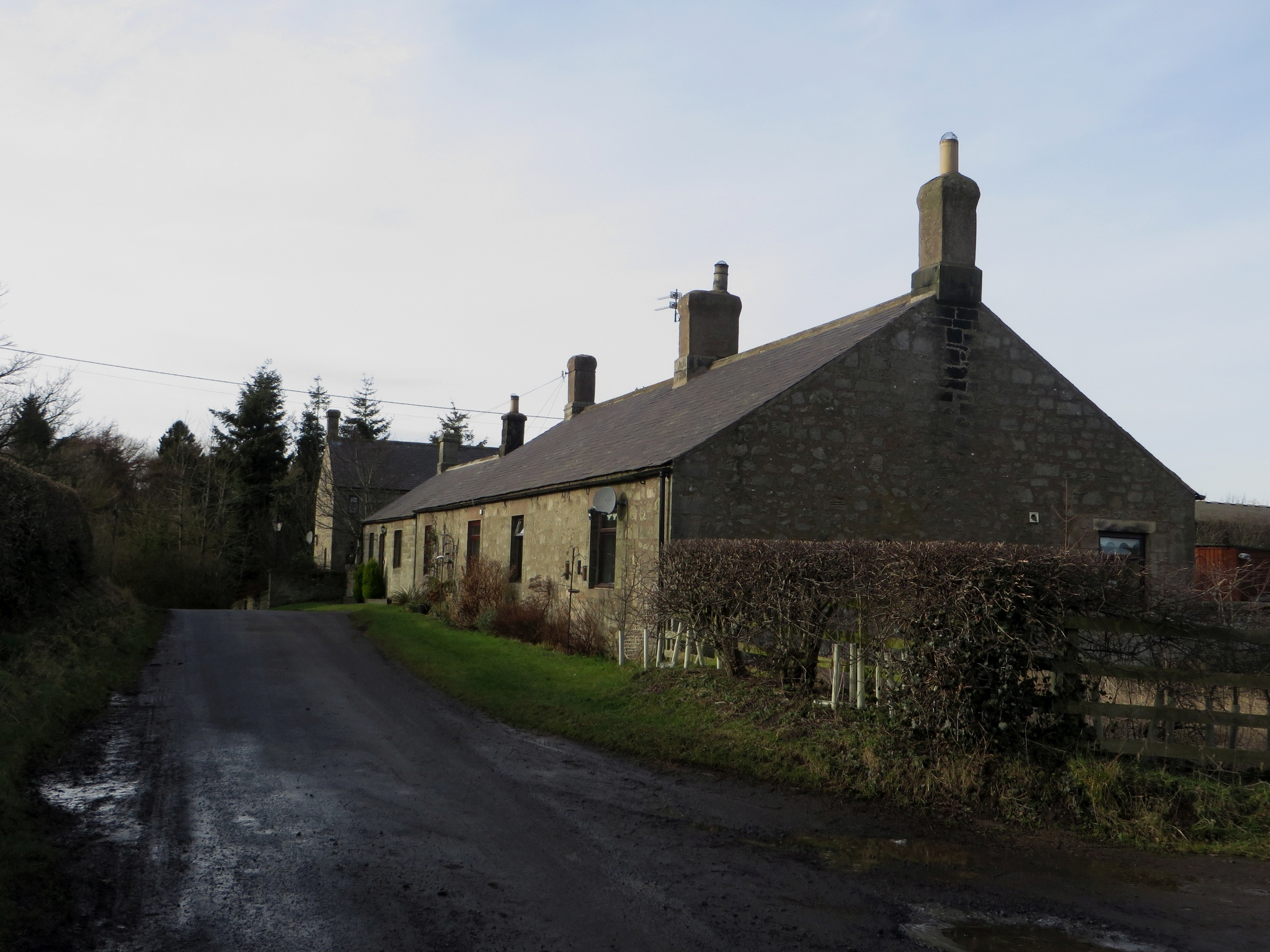

- Location within Northumberland
- OS grid reference: NU155325
- Civil parish: Adderstone with Lucker
- Unitary authority: Northumberland
- Shire county: Northumberland
- Region: North East
- Country: England
- Sovereign state: United Kingdom
- Post town: BELFORD
- Postcode district: NE70
- Police: Northumbria
- Fire: Northumberland
- Ambulance: North East
- UK Parliament: Berwick-upon-Tweed

Bradford is a village and former civil parish, now in the parish of Adderstone with Lucker, in the county of Northumberland, England. It is situated to the south-west of Bamburgh, a short distance inland from the North Sea coast. In 1951 the parish had a population of 14.

== History ==
The name "Bradford" means 'Broad ford'. Bradford was formerly a township in the parish of Bambrough, from 1866 Bradford was a civil parish in its own right until it was abolished on 1 April 1955 to form Adderstone with Lucker.

== Governance ==
Bradford is in the parliamentary constituency of North Northumberland.
