= Tranwell Airfield =

Tranwell Airfield RAF Morpeth

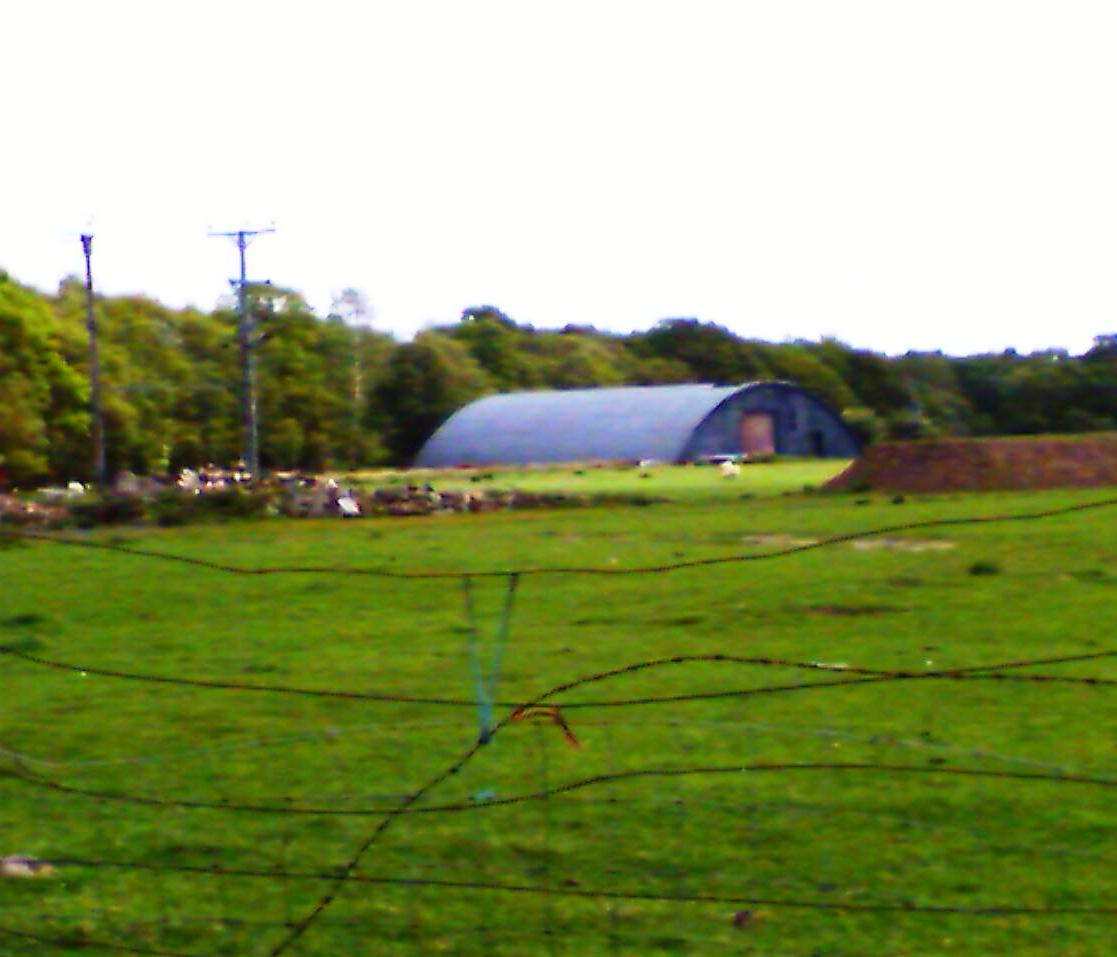
- Disused Aircraft Hangar
- IATA: none; ICAO: none

Summary
- Airport type: Military
- Owner: Air Ministry
- Operator: Royal Air Force
- Location: Morpeth, Northumberland
- Built: 1941
- In use: 1942–1948
- Elevation AMSL: 325 ft / 99 m
- Coordinates: 55°07′44″N 001°44′08″W

Map
- Location in Northumberland

Runways
Direction	Length		Surface
Direction	ft	m	Surface
00/00	0	0	Asphalt
00/00	0	0	Asphalt
00/00	0	0	Asphalt

Tranwell Airfield is a former airfield located 3.3 miles (5.3 km) southwest of Morpeth and 11.5 miles (18.5 km) north west of Newcastle upon Tyne, Tyne and Wear, England.

The former airfield is the site of the former Royal Air Force Station Morpeth or simply RAF Morpeth which was an air gunnery school and was home to No. 80 (French) Operational Training Unit RAF. Today the site has reverted to agriculture although several wartime buildings remain and are used for storage. Parts of the hard standings also survive and are used for a car boot sale every Sunday.

== History ==
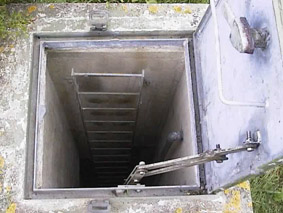
Nearby ROC post hatch

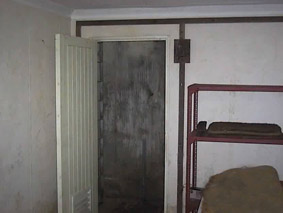
ROC post underground control room

The airfield initially housed No. 4 Air Gunnery School (4 AGS). Accommodation was in 10 dispersal sites to the north and east of the airfield near Tranwell village and The Whitehouse Centre (post-war this became a children's hospital). The main aircraft used during its early existence for teaching air gunners was the unpopular Blackburn Botha, which was very heavy and under-powered, often taking the whole of the runway to get airborne. Following several crashes and collisions, it was eventually replaced with the Avro Anson. Most of the air gunnery practice occurred off shore at Druridge Bay where several of the original wartime structures still exist at the National Trust site, and flew between Newbiggin by the Sea and Coquet Island near Amble. Many of the airmen who flew here were Polish and several settled in the Morpeth area following the war. A large number of Polish casualties including airmen from the airfield are buried in the graveyard of St Mary's Church, Morpeth.

Other units included

- No. 72 Squadron RAF
- No. 80 (French) Operational Training Unit RAF
- No. 261 Maintenance Unit RAF
- Newcastle Gliding Club

== Accidents and incidents ==
On Monday 16 November 1942, A Blackburn Botha took off on the incorrect runway and collided with another Botha. One man was killed and another injured.

On Monday 29 March 1943, two Blackburn Botha Mk.I aircraft collided in mid-air near the aerodrome during a demonstration flight for the benefit of Air Vice Marshal Sir Philip Babington, Officer Commanding No.29 (Training) Group, who was visiting the aerodrome that day. Bothas W5137 and W5154 crashed and were totally destroyed, with all 10 airmen onboard the two aircraft being killed. Five of the eight trainee air gunners were members of the Royal Netherlands Naval Air Service. Several of the dead were buried at St. Mary's Churchyard, just to the south of Morpeth town centre.

== Current use ==
Today the site has reverted to grazing land although several wartime buildings remain and are used for storage. Parts of the hard standings also survive. A small privately owned part to the North West is used for a car boot sale every Sunday between March and November. There are still a number of buildings in nearby fields and an underground control room hidden in the small group of trees behind the airfield. One of these buildings is a blister hangar. Other structures include an air raid shelter, gun-firing test butts and other unidentified structures.

In March of each year Morpeth Races Point to Point Races are held at the former airfield.

== See also ==
- List of former Royal Air Force stations
