= Castle Morpeth Borough Council elections =

Local government elections in Northumberland, England

Castle Morpeth Borough Council elections were generally held every four years between the council's creation in 1974 and its abolition in 2009. Castle Morpeth was a non-metropolitan district in Northumberland, England. The council was abolished and its functions transferred to Northumberland County Council with effect from 1 April 2009.

== Political control ==
The first election to the council was held in 1973, initially operating as a shadow authority before coming into its powers on 1 April 1974. Throughout the council's existence from 1974 to 2009, the council was under no overall control, with no party ever winning a majority of the seats.

Party in control	Years
No overall control	1974–2009

== Council elections ==
- 1973 Castle Morpeth Borough Council election
- 1976 Castle Morpeth Borough Council election (New ward boundaries)
- 1979 Castle Morpeth Borough Council election
- 1983 Castle Morpeth Borough Council election
- 1987 Castle Morpeth Borough Council election (Borough boundary changes took place but the number of seats remained the same)
- 1991 Castle Morpeth Borough Council election
- 1995 Castle Morpeth Borough Council election (Borough boundary changes took place but the number of seats remained the same)
- 1999 Castle Morpeth Borough Council election (New ward boundaries)
- 2003 Castle Morpeth Borough Council election
- 2007 Castle Morpeth Borough Council election (New ward boundaries)

== Results maps ==
2003 results map

2007 results map

== By-election results ==
=== 1995-1999 ===
Ulgham By-Election 6 March 1997
Party	Candidate	Votes	%	±%
Labour		unopposed		
Labour hold		Swing		

Ulgham By-Election 3 July 1997
Party	Candidate	Votes	%	±%
Independent		504	48.5	−8.7
Labour		410	39.5	−3.3
Conservative		70	6.7	+6.7
Independent		55	5.2	+5.2
Majority		94	9.0	
Turnout		1,039		
Independent hold		Swing		

Ellington By-Election 10 December 1998
Party	Candidate	Votes	%	±%
Liberal Democrats		397	51.2	+2.1
Labour		379	48.8	−2.1
Majority		18	2.4	
Turnout		776	35.0	
Liberal Democrats gain from Labour		Swing		

=== 1999-2003 ===
Morpeth Kirkhill By-Election 11 November 1999
Party	Candidate	Votes	%	±%
Labour		306	40.7	+8.0
Independent		274	36.5	−12.0
Conservative		141	18.8	+0.1
Green		30	4.0	+4.0
Majority		32	4.2	
Turnout		751	32.0	
Labour gain from Independent		Swing		

Morpeth Kirkhill By-Election 21 June 2001
Party	Candidate	Votes	%	±%
Liberal Democrats		510	71.5	+71.5
Labour		184	25.8	−14.9
Green		19	2.7	−1.3
Majority		326	45.7	
Turnout		713	33.4	
Liberal Democrats gain from Labour		Swing		

Ulgham By-Election 12 September 2002
Party	Candidate	Votes	%	±%
Liberal Democrats		462	75.0	+75.0
Independent		154	25.0	−47.6
Majority		308	50.0	
Turnout		616	26.7	
Liberal Democrats gain from Independent		Swing		

=== 2003-2007 ===
Lynemouth By-Election 12 June 2003
Party	Candidate	Votes	%	±%
Independent		413	69.8	+69.8
Labour		179	30.2	−0.7
Majority		234	39.6	
Turnout		592	44.0	
Independent gain from Independent Labour				

Morpeth Stobhill By-Election 18 March 2004
Party	Candidate	Votes	%	±%
Independent		225	28.4	−10.0
Labour		218	27.5	−23.1
Liberal Democrats		217	27.4	+27.4
Conservative		132	16.7	+5.7
Majority		8	0.9	
Turnout		792	33.0	
Independent hold		Swing		

Pegswood By-Election 21 July 2005
Party	Candidate	Votes	%	±%
Liberal Democrats	Juliet Oakley	417	62.0	+62.0
Labour	Edward Campbell	242	36.0	−44.6
Green	Geoffrey Parkin	14	2.0	+2.0
Majority		175	26.0	
Turnout		673		
Liberal Democrats gain from Labour		Swing		

Ponteland East By-Election 21 July 2005
Party	Candidate	Votes	%	±%
Conservative	Peter Armstrong	468	58.6	+11.5
Liberal Democrats	David Cogan	312	39.1	−13.8
Green	Paul Lawrence	18	2.3	+2.3
Majority		156	19.5	
Turnout		798		
Conservative gain from Liberal Democrats		Swing		
