= Unthank, Angus =

Coordinates: 56.741623°N 2.653901°W

Unthank
- Location within Angus
- OS grid reference: NO601613
- Council area: Angus
- Lieutenancy area: Angus
- Country: Scotland
- Sovereign state: United Kingdom
- Post town: BRECHIN
- Postcode district: DD9
- Dialling code: 01356
- Police: Scotland
- Fire: Scottish
- Ambulance: Scottish

Unthank is a hamlet in Angus, Scotland. It lies approximately half a mile north-west of Brechin on the B966 Brechin to Edzell road. It used to be a possession of the Barony of Spynie.

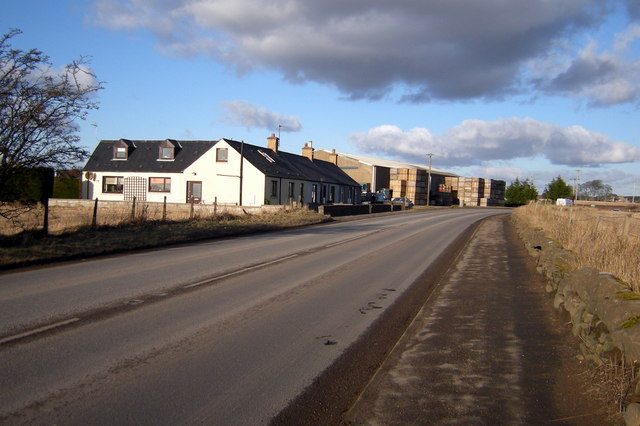
Unthank store and houses
