= Pigdon =

Hamlet in Northumberland, England

Coordinates: 55.188292°N 1.7584302°W

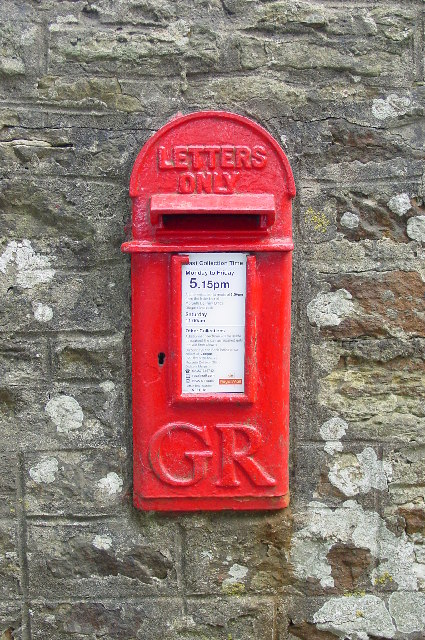

- Location within Northumberland
- Civil parish: Meldon
- Unitary authority: Northumberland
- Ceremonial county: Northumberland
- Region: North East
- Country: England
- Sovereign state: United Kingdom
- Police: Northumbria
- Fire: Northumberland
- Ambulance: North East

Pigdon is a hamlet and former civil parish 3 miles (4.8 km) from Morpeth, now in the parish of Meldon, in the county of Northumberland, England. In 1951 the parish had a population of 52.

== History ==
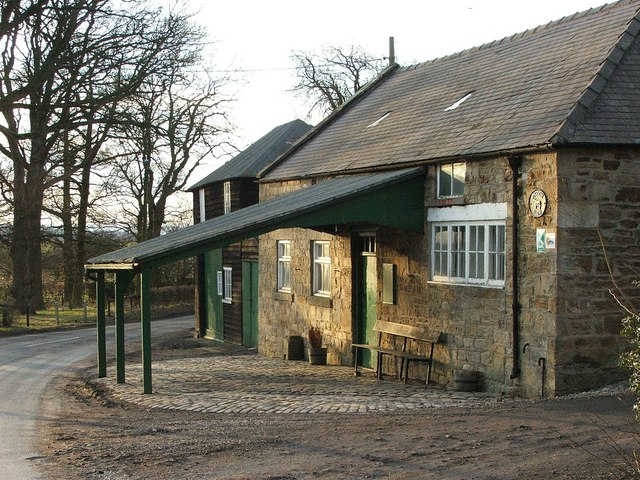
Farm at Pigdon

The name "Pigdon" may mean 'Pica's valley', or 'pointed hill valley'. The surname derives from the place. Pigdon was "Pikedenn" in 1205 and "Pykeden" in 1242. Pigdon was a township in Mitford parish. From 1866 Pigdon was a civil parish in its own right until it was merged with Meldon on 1 April 1955.
