= Bambrough =

Bambrough is a surname. Notable people with the surname include:

- Laura Bambrough, (1964–2014), known professionally as L'Wren Scott, American fashion designer, costume designer, and model
- Renford Bambrough (1926–1999), British philosopher
