= Lucker, Northumberland =

Village in England

Coordinates: 55.5656°N 1.7601°W

Lucker
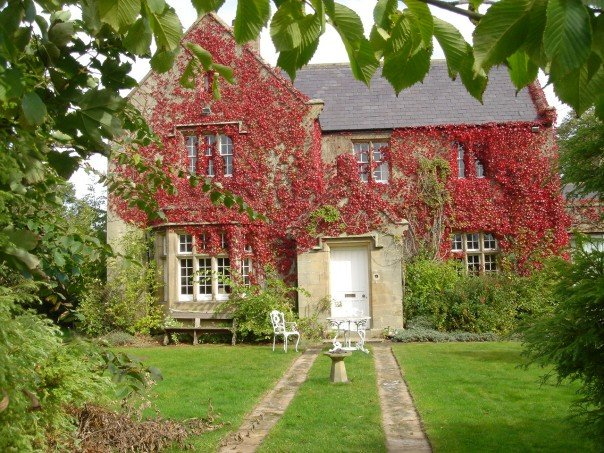
- Lucker House

- Location within Northumberland
- OS grid reference: NU152302
- Civil parish: Adderstone with Lucker
- Unitary authority: Northumberland
- Ceremonial county: Northumberland
- Region: North East
- Country: England
- Sovereign state: United Kingdom
- Post town: Belford
- Postcode district: NE70
- Police: Northumbria
- Fire: Northumberland
- Ambulance: North East
- UK Parliament: North Northumberland

Lucker is a village and former civil parish, now in the parish of Adderstone with Lucker, in the north of the county of Northumberland, England. It is about 5 miles from Bamburgh (known for Bamburgh Castle). It has an inn, The Apple Inn, and a church, St Hilda's. In 1951 the parish had a population of 120.

== History ==
The name "Lucker" may mean 'the hollows' or 'lake marsh'. Lucker was formerly a township and chapelry in the parish of Bamburgh, from 1866 Lucker was a civil parish in its own right until it was abolished on 1 April 1955 to form Adderstone with Lucker.

== Landmarks ==
Lucker House, in the centre of Lucker, adjacent to St Hilda's church, was previously the Vicarage. Built c.1840 by Hugh Percy, 3rd Duke of Northumberland, and subsequently given to the church, it is a Grade II listed building.
