= Bellshill, Northumberland =

Village in Northumberland, England

Coordinates: 55.570°N 1.805°W

Bellshill
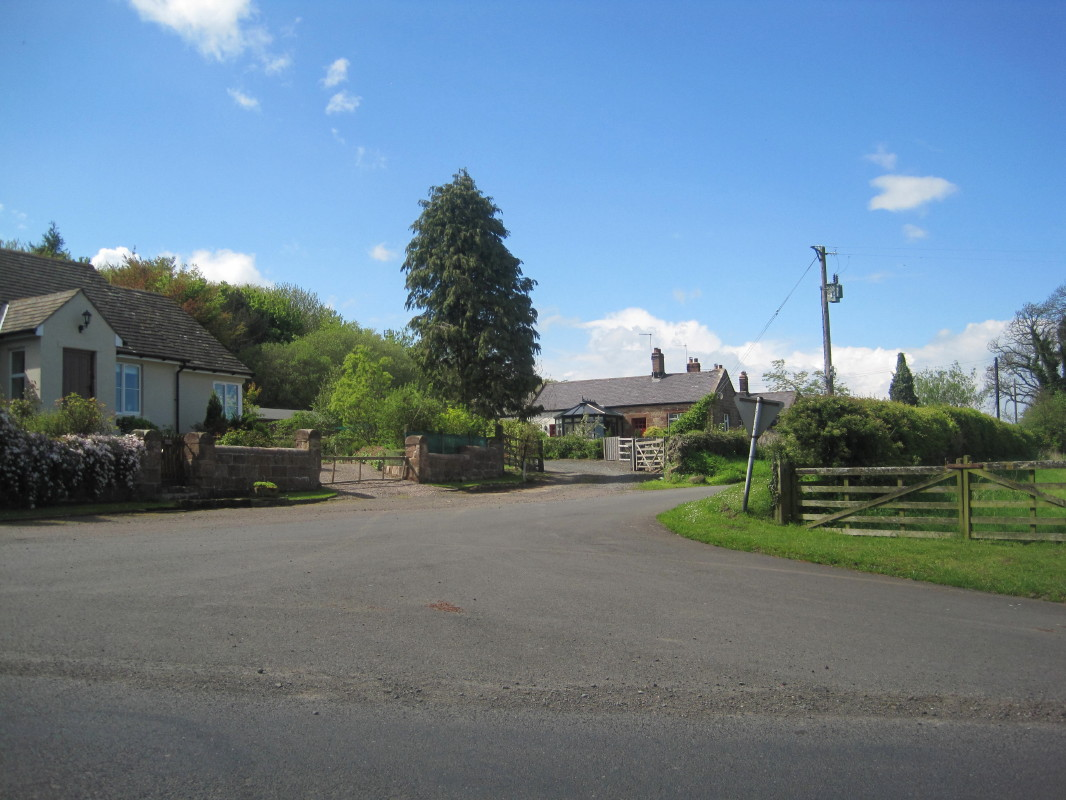
- Cottages in Bellshill

- Location within Northumberland
- OS grid reference: NU123306
- District: Northumberland
- Shire county: Northumberland
- Region: North East
- Country: England
- Sovereign state: United Kingdom
- Post town: BELFORD
- Postcode district: NE70
- Police: Northumbria
- Fire: Northumberland
- Ambulance: North East
- UK Parliament: North Northumberland

Bellshill is a village in Northumberland, in England. It is situated to the south-west of Bamburgh, inland from the North Sea coast, in the Adderstone with Lucker civil parish.

== Governance ==
Bellshill is in the parliamentary constituency of North Northumberland.
