= Meldon, Northumberland =

Village in Northumberland, England

Coordinates: 55.1456°N 1.8054°W

Meldon
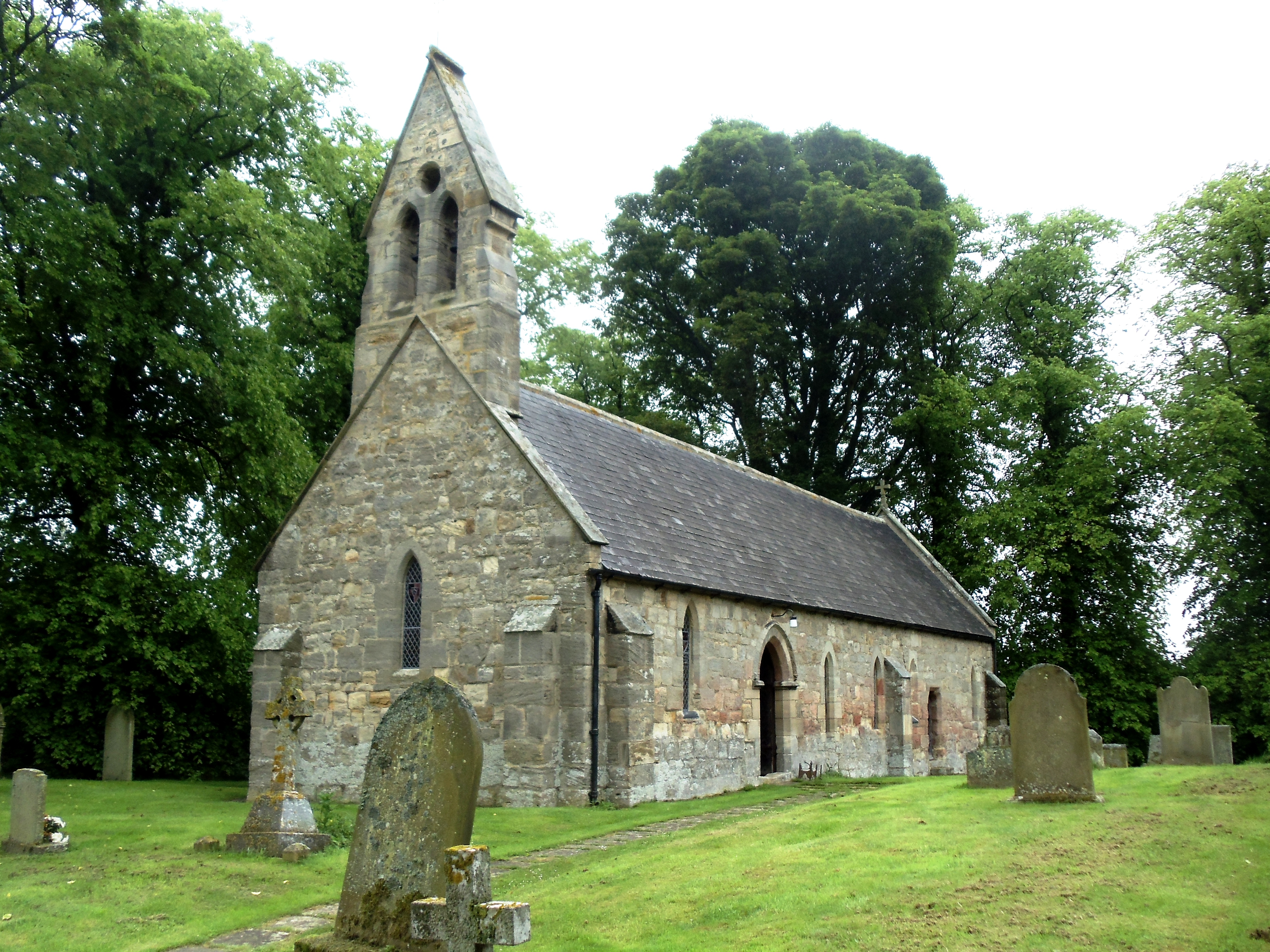
- St. John the Baptist Church, Meldon

- Location within Northumberland
- Population: 162 (2001 census)
- OS grid reference: NZ125835
- Civil parish: Meldon
- Unitary authority: Northumberland
- Ceremonial county: Northumberland
- Region: North East
- Country: England
- Sovereign state: United Kingdom
- Post town: MORPETH
- Postcode district: NE61
- Police: Northumbria
- Fire: Northumberland
- Ambulance: North East
- UK Parliament: Wansbeck

Meldon is a village and civil parish in Northumberland, England. It lies to the west of Morpeth. It is a Thankful Village, and is featured on Darren Hayman's album, Thankful Villages Volume 3. The parish includes the hamlets of Molesden, Newton Underwood, Pigdon and Throphill. The population of the parish of Meldon as taken at the 2001 Census was 162, increasing to 242 at the 2011 Census.

== Governance ==
In 1894 Meldon became part of Morpeth Rural District, on 1 April 1955 the parishes of Longshaws, Molesden, Newton Park, Newton Underwood, Nunriding, Pigdon, Rivergreen and Throphill were abolished and merged with Meldon. In 1974 Meldon became part of Castle Morpeth non-metropolitan district. In 2009 it became part of the unitary authority area of Northumberland when the 6 districts of Northumberland were merged into 1.
