= Brownieside =

Hamlet in Northumberland, England

Coordinates: 55.507°N 1.744°W

- Location within Northumberland
- OS grid reference: NU162237
- District: Northumberland
- Shire county: Northumberland
- Region: North East
- Country: England
- Sovereign state: United Kingdom
- Post town: CHATHILL
- Postcode district: NE67
- Dialling code: 01665
- Police: Northumbria
- Fire: Northumberland
- Ambulance: North East
- UK Parliament: Berwick-upon-Tweed

Brownieside is a hamlet in Northumberland, in England. It is situated between Alnwick and Berwick-upon-Tweed, on the A1 a short distance to the north of North Charlton. Road works are underway to the A1 that connects Brownside to a junction.

== Governance ==
Brownieside was in the parliamentary constituency of Berwick-upon-Tweed. The seat got renamed to North Northumberland (UK Parliament constituency) for the 2024 United Kingdom general election.
