= Middle Ord =

Hamlet in Northumberland, England

Coordinates: 55.748°N 2.057°W

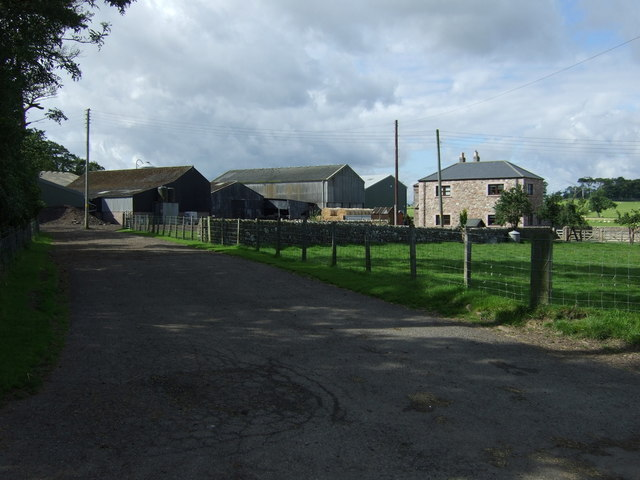

- Location within Northumberland
- OS grid reference: NT965505
- Civil parish: Ord
- Unitary authority: Northumberland
- Ceremonial county: Northumberland
- Region: North East
- Country: England
- Sovereign state: United Kingdom
- Post town: TD15 BERWICK UPON TWEED
- Postcode district: TD15
- Police: Northumbria
- Fire: Northumberland
- Ambulance: North East
- UK Parliament: Berwick-upon-Tweed

Middle Ord is a small hamlet, between West Ord and East Ord, and west of the town of Berwick upon Tweed, Northumberland England. The population as of March 2008, is nineteen residents within seven dwellings, centered on Middle Ord Manor House. It is in the civil parish of Ord.

== Governance ==
Middle Ord is in the parliamentary constituency of Berwick-upon-Tweed.
