= Unthank, North Yorkshire =

Former village in North Yorkshire, England

Coordinates: 54°18′36″N 1°43′54″W

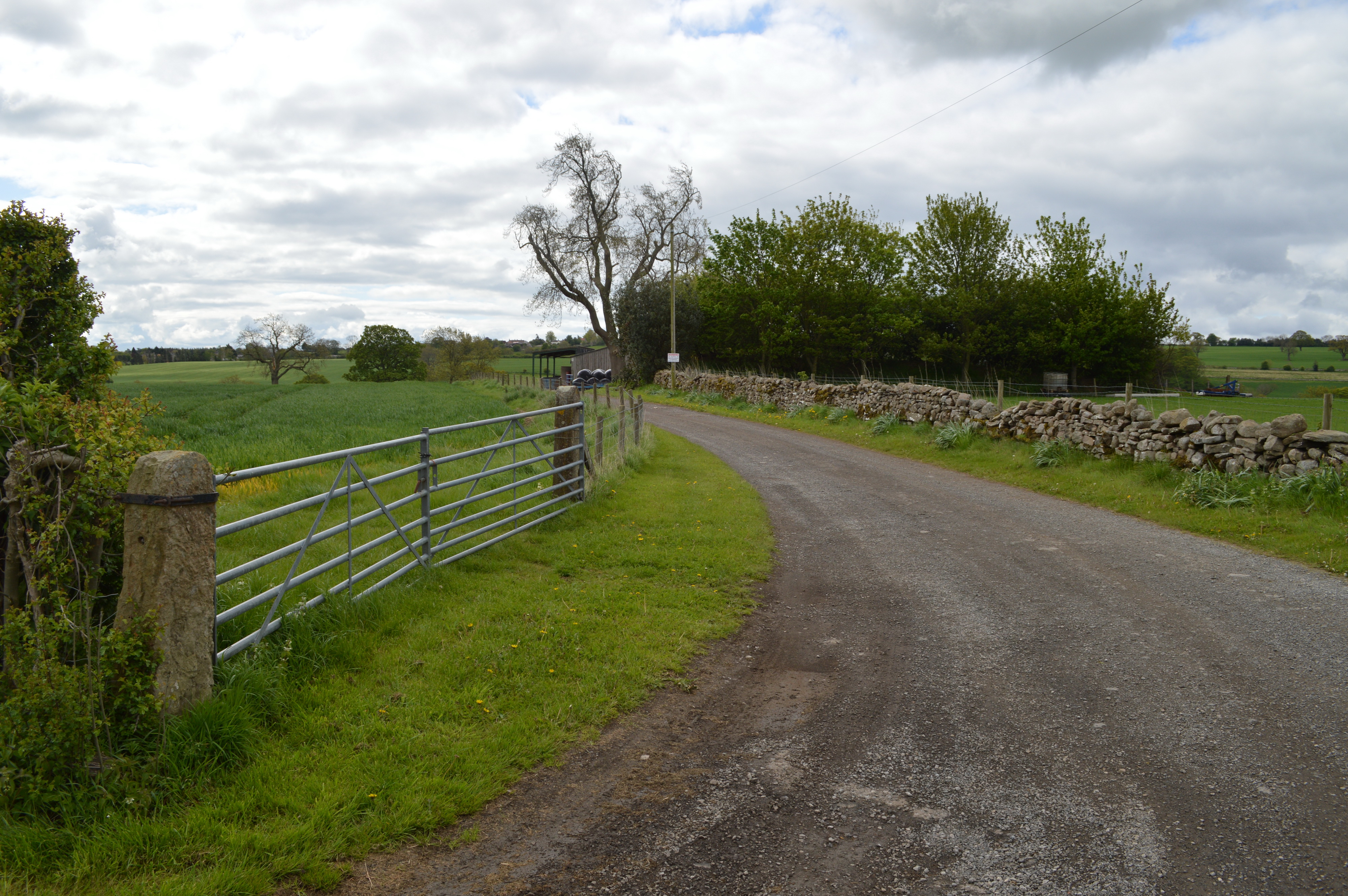
Unthank Farm

Unthank is a former village near Constable Burton in North Yorkshire, England. The village survived until some time in the 19th century. The site is currently that of Unthank Farm, a mail-order foods business.

== See also ==
- Unthank, Stanhope
