= William Benthall =

English cricketer

William Henry Benthall (3 July 1837 – 4 January 1909) was an English first-class cricketer active 1858–68 who played for Middlesex. He played in 37 first-class matches as a righthanded batsman, scoring 1,030 runs with a highest score of 103.

Benthall was born in Westminster in 1837 and educated at Westminster School, Marlborough College and Clare College, Cambridge. He played cricket for Cambridge University and was awarded a blue. After graduating he became a civil servant and was a clerk in the Board of Control (the India Board) and then in the India Office. He was précis writer and assistant private secretary to three Secretaries of State for India: Sir Charles Wood (later Lord Halifax), Lord Cranborne (later Marquess of Salisbury) and Sir Stafford Northcote (later Earl of Iddesleigh). He was private secretary to the Duke of Argyll 1868–74. He died at St Leonards-on-Sea at age 71.
