= Unthank, Stanhope =

Coordinates: 54°44′30″N 2°00′30″W

Unthank
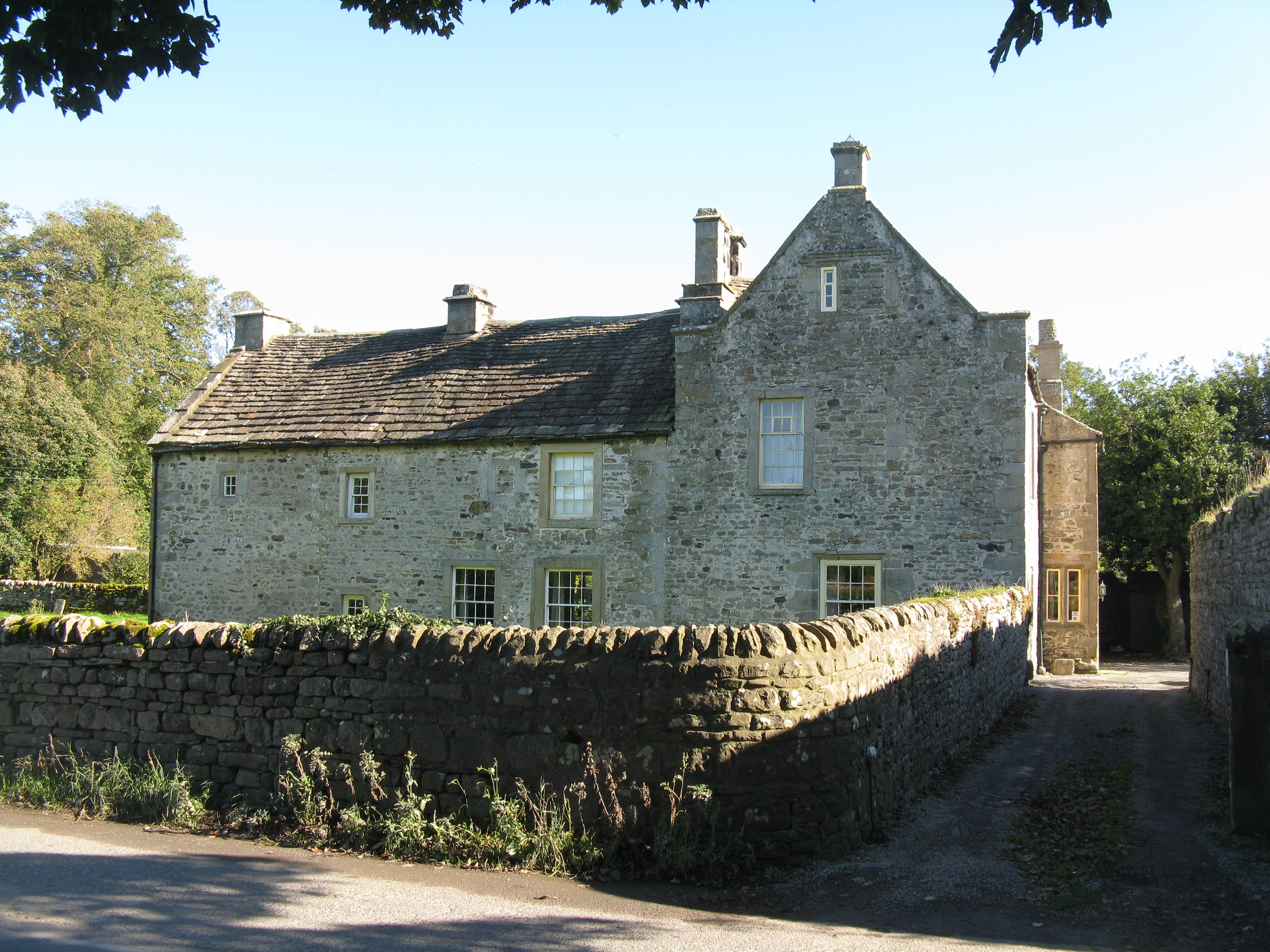
- Unthank Hall

- Location within County Durham
- Civil parish: Stanhope
- Unitary authority: County Durham
- Ceremonial county: County Durham
- Region: North East
- Country: England
- Sovereign state: United Kingdom

Unthank is a collection of houses in the civil parish of Stanhope, in County Durham, England. Unthank can be found just over Stanhope Ford and at the bottom of Softley Bank. It consists of Unthank Mill, Unthank Hall, Unthank Farm and Unthank Cottage, now called the Railway Cottage. Unthank Mill backs onto Unthank Park which is a popular caravan park, and also host to Stanhope's agricultural shows and other local events.

== See also ==
- Unthank, North Yorkshire
