= Low Cocklaw =

Hamlet in Northumberland, England

Coordinates: 55.775°N 2.073°W

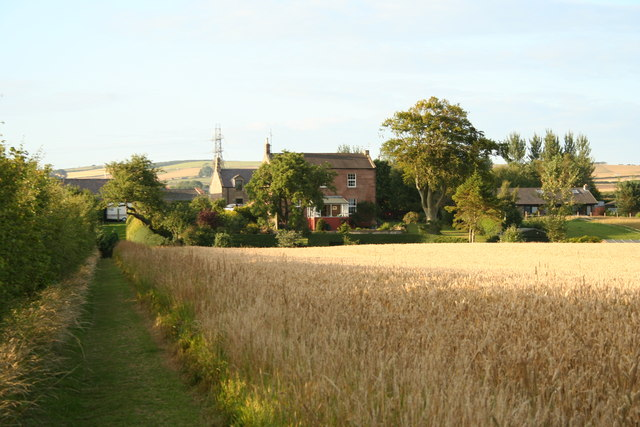
- Low Cocklaw from the south

- Location within Northumberland
- OS grid reference: NT955535
- Civil parish: Berwick-upon-Tweed
- Unitary authority: Northumberland
- Ceremonial county: Northumberland
- Region: North East
- Country: England
- Sovereign state: United Kingdom
- Post town: BERWICK UPON TWEED
- Postcode district: TD15
- Police: Northumbria
- Fire: Northumberland
- Ambulance: North East
- UK Parliament: North Northumberland

Low Cocklaw is a small hamlet in the civil parish of Berwick-upon-Tweed, about 3 miles (5 km) west of Berwick-upon-Tweed, in Northumberland, England. Until the early 1980s it was a working farm but is now entirely residential. It is surrounded by rolling farmland which is dominated by cereal growing.

== Etymology ==
Allen Mawer rather tentatively identified the early place-name Creklawe~Crokelawe attested in 1296 with Cocklaw. If so, the initial cr- points to a Cumbric origin: Cumbric crug 'hill', to which was later added Old English hlǣw 'hill'. But if this identification is incorrect, Cocklaw on its own would more obviously be an entirely Old English word, combining cocc 'cock' and hlǣw 'hill'.

== History ==
Low Cocklaw is situated close to the ancient borough boundary of Berwick-upon-Tweed, which ran north–south at this point, and now forms part of the border between England and Scotland. A road or track runs along this part and, in the past, was a route allowing horse-drawn wagons travelling between England and Scotland to by-pass the tolls through Berwick. There were fords at the crossings of the rivers Tweed and Whiteadder and the wagons would need extra pulling-power to haul them up the hill north of the Whiteadder. Local tradition is that Low Cocklaw derives its name from this; a "law" being the local word for a hill and a "cock-horse" being a heavy draught horse. Hence the farm nearest the river, from which a draught horse could be hired, was Low Cocklaw and, for the next stage of the haul, the farm higher up the hill to the north was High Cocklaw. Further north again, on the other side of the hill on the same route, there is a Cocklaw Farm above Ayton village, which would have provided the same service for wagons travelling south from Scotland to England. Low Cocklaw is no longer a farm. It was converted into housing in the 1980s. On 6 July 2020 it had a population of 16, made up of 9 households.

== Governance ==
Low Cocklaw is in the parliamentary constituency of Berwick-upon-Tweed.
