= Tranwell =

Village in Northumberland, England

Coordinates: 55.146°N 1.711°W

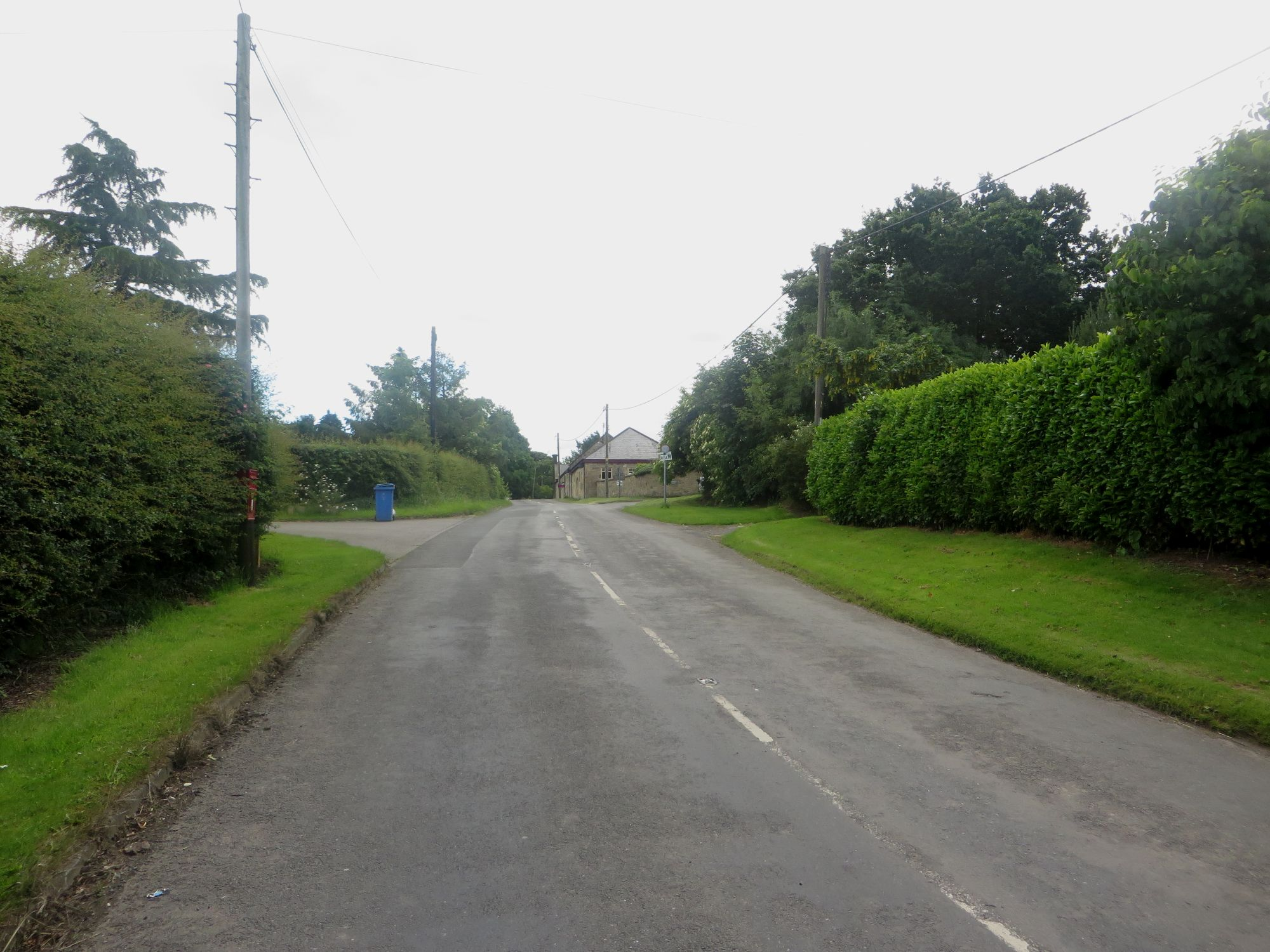

- Location within Northumberland
- OS grid reference: NZ185835
- Civil parish: Mitford
- Unitary authority: Northumberland
- Ceremonial county: Northumberland
- Region: North East
- Country: England
- Sovereign state: United Kingdom
- Post town: MORPETH
- Postcode district: NE61
- Police: Northumbria
- Fire: Northumberland
- Ambulance: North East
- UK Parliament: Berwick-upon-Tweed

Tranwell is a small village and former civil parish, now in the parish of Mitford, in the county of Northumberland, England, about 1 mile (2 km) south west of Morpeth. It lies alongside the A1 road which now bypasses Morpeth. Tranwell is approximately 15 miles from the Newcastle International Airport and over 3 miles away from Morpeth train station. The closest major city to Tranwell is Newcastle upon Tyne. In 1951 the parish had a population of 154.

== Governance ==
Tranwell is in the parliamentary constituency of Berwick-upon-Tweed and is represented in the UK Parliament by Anne Marie-Trevelyan. The parish was formed on 30 September 1894 from part of Tranwell and High Church, on 1 April 1955 the parish was abolished and merged with Mitford.

== See also ==
- Tranwell Airfield
