= East Ord =

Village in Northumberland, England

Coordinates: 55.757°N 2.025°W

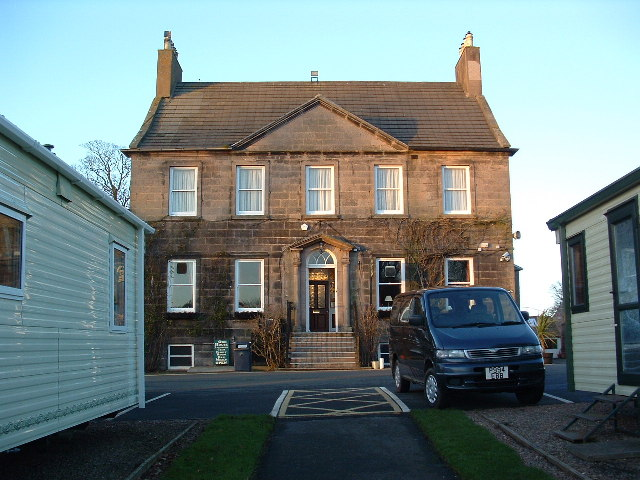
- Ord House

- Location within Northumberland
- OS grid reference: NT985515
- Unitary authority: Northumberland
- Ceremonial county: Northumberland
- Region: North East
- Country: England
- Sovereign state: United Kingdom
- Post town: BERWICK UPON TWEED
- Postcode district: TD15
- Dialling code: 01289
- Police: Northumbria
- Fire: Northumberland
- Ambulance: North East
- UK Parliament: North Northumberland

East Ord is a village in Northumberland, England about 2 miles (3 km) south west of Berwick Upon Tweed. It lies on the south bank of the River Tweed adjacent to the A1 Road.

== History ==
The village was originally called Ord, with Middle Ord and West Ord being built at a later date. It gave its name to the family of Ord and was the family's seat. The Ords of Ord owned the village until the early fifteenth century. To the east of the village is Ord House. Ord House manor was originally built for Admiral Godolfin Osborne in 1789; noted in 1828 as belonging to James Grieve Esq; and an Osborne lived there until 1954. The manor house and grounds are now part of Ord House Country park, a quiet landscaped caravan park. Ord is widely scattered, and was confirmed by a Local Government Order in 1891 to be a separate parish for civil purposes, which included East, Middle and West Ord. The village itself is small, built in a rectangular form enclosing a green. In Kelly's Directory of 1897 the Kelso branch of the North Eastern railway passed through the township.

== Governance ==
East Ord is in the parliamentary constituency of North Northumberland.

There Local council is Northumberland County Council which delivers both county and district level services.
