= Bilton Banks, Northumberland =

Village in England

Coordinates: 55.3847°N 1.6708°W

Bilton Banks was a village in Northumberland adjacent to the coal mines of Shilbottle and Longdyke. It was home to many miners’ families from the late 19th century through the mid 20th century, when the mines were finally closed and the houses condemned and demolished. Today there is nothing to show that, for almost three quarters of a century, a close-knit community of dozens of working families lived and worked there but still, hidden beneath a peaceful agricultural scene, lie the tunnels and workings in which they laboured to bring up the coal to feed British industry.

== History ==
=== The Pit ===
Coal mining has been associated with this area of north east England for many hundreds of years. It is believed that monks from nearby Hulne Priory were mining coal in the area from around the 12th century and written survey records, held by the Newcastle Society of Antiquaries, exist from the 1500s of transactions involving the transfer of ownership of coal mines and mining rights. There are three main seams of coal in the Shilbottle area of Northumberland, the Townsend, Cannel and Shilbottle and these have been mined in various ways for many hundreds of years at various locations, resulting in multiple spoil heaps becoming part of the countryside over time. Nineteenth century Shilbottle is described in Parish data of the period as comprising five poor law townships of Shilbottle, Shilbottle Woodhouse, Hazon, Hartlaw and Newton-on-the-Moor.

The mine most associated with Bilton Banks community was Longdyke Pit. It was sunk in about 1844/5 at a depth of around 25 fathoms (a fathom equals 1.828 metres or approximately 6 feet). The shaft was ten and a half feet in diameter. Coal was transported underground on a system of carts and rails. The carts were towed by pit ponies who lived for many years in the mines, never coming up into the sunlight until they were retired, by which time their eyesight had often been badly affected. The mine operated three shifts of miners. Day to day injuries were common, after all, mining was a dangerous occupation but according to The Coalmining History Resource Centre, in the 50-year period from 1800 there were on average three major colliery disasters nationally every year. During this period 3,486 men and boys were recorded as killed or injured underground. Things were even worse in the next 50 years with 59,580 serious injuries and deaths. The most common cause of death appears to be "Fall of Stone".

=== The Village ===
In the census of June 1841, the village of Bilton Banks shows only two families of agricultural workers as resident. Following an adverse report of housing conditions in the village of Shilbottle by a sanitary inspector in 1874, housing at Bilton Banks was constructed adjacent to Longdyke Colliery, to house the mine workers. By the census of 1881, 29 dwellings are listed with a total of 144 occupants and by 1891 164 people are shown as living in the village, of which by far the majority worked in some fashion at the colliery. Living conditions were Spartan however with only one room below, two above and for most, no inside sink, bath or toilet facilities. Later additions included a lean-to wash house with a sink and pantry on the rear of the house. The enclosed ‘privies’, consisting of a wooden seat with a hole in it under which was positioned a large galvanised bucket, were a short walk across the lane and beyond them were the middens which were cleared weekly by the ‘night soil men’ with wheelbarrows, horse and cart. With the poor state of the nation’s health, highlighted by the poor quality of recruits offered to the military, national health became a government concern between the wars and beginning with the 1919 ‘Addison Act’ (named after its author, Dr Christopher Addison) various housing acts transferred responsibility for working class housing, sanitation and living conditions to local authorities. Longdyke Colliery was abandoned in August 1925 but the village remained. In 1937 the houses at Bilton Banks, owned at that time by the Duke of Northumberland, were inspected under the provisions of the Housing Act 1925. The Inspector, after a detailed survey of the properties, concluded that the houses should be condemned and the occupants re-housed. However, many survived into the 1950s before finally being demolished.

=== Industrial Relations ===
With working conditions as hard as they undoubtedly were, strikes occurred with regularity in the oft repeated endeavour to improve miners’ conditions. These met with varying degrees of success. In 1831 at Shilbottle, the miners prevailed but in 1832 the coal owners crushed the union, ensuring that little immediate improvement occurred. A national movement gradually developed which led to strike action being recommended in 1912. Agreement was reached locally on a minimum wage but the Northumberland Miners’ Federation refused permission for the men to work without the assent of the National Federation. National economic conditions resulted in local shopkeepers refusing credit which severely impacted families in mining communities. The manager of the Shilbottle company gave local families permission to scavenge the heaps close to the colliery for coal. Fortunately the strike ended with the passage, on 28 March 1912, of the Coal Mines (Minimum Wage) Act 1912.
