= Yetlington =

Village in Northumberland, England

Coordinates: 55.379°N 1.962°W

- Location within Northumberland
- OS grid reference: NU025095
- Civil parish: Callaly
- Unitary authority: Northumberland
- Shire county: Northumberland
- Region: North East
- Country: England
- Sovereign state: United Kingdom
- Post town: ALNWICK
- Postcode district: NE66
- Dialling code: 01665
- Police: Northumbria
- Fire: Northumberland
- Ambulance: North East
- UK Parliament: Berwick-upon-Tweed

Yetlington is a village in the civil parish of Callaly, in the county of Northumberland, England.

Yetlington seems to have been known in the Middle Ages as Yatlington, and was owned by the de Clavering family.

== Governance ==
Yetlington is in the parliamentary constituency of Berwick-upon-Tweed.
