= Churnsike Lodge =

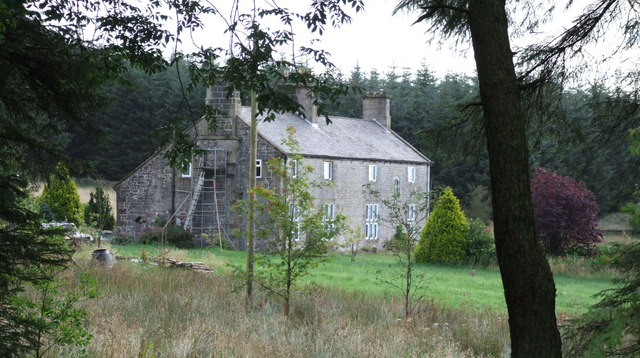
- Churnsike Lodge

- Location within Northumberland

General information
- Location: Greystead, west Northumberland, England, United Kingdom
- Coordinates: 55°05′13″N 2°31′41″W
- OS grid reference: NY664771

Churnsike Lodge is an early Victorian hunting lodge situated in the parish of Greystead, west Northumberland, England. Constructed in 1850 by the Charlton family, descendants of the noted Border Reivers family of the English Middle March, the lodge formed part of the extensive Hesleyside estate, located some 10 miles from Hesleyside Hall itself.

Consisting of the main house, stable block, hunting-dog kennels and gamekeepers bothy, when the property was acquired by the Chesters Estate in 1887 the 'Cairnsyke' estate consisted of several thousand acres of moorland, much of which was managed to support shooting of the formerly populous black grouse. Although much of this land has now reverted to fellside or has been otherwise managed as part of the commercial timber plantations of Kielder Forest, areas of heather moorland persist, dotted with remnants of the shooting butts. It is with reference to these fells that the 1887 sale catalogue described the estate as being the "Finest grouse moor in the Kingdom".

Historically, the Lodge was home to the Irthing Head and Kielder hounds, regionally renowned and headed by the locally famed fox hunter William Dodd. Dodd, and his hounds, are repeatedly referenced in the traditional Northumbrian ballads of James Armstrong's 'Wanny Blossoms'.

Having fallen into ruin by the 1980s, the property fell into the care of the Forestry Commission and was slated for demolition, as many properties in the area were, until being privately purchased. The former gamekeepers bothy now serves as a holiday-home.
