= Unthank, Alnham =

Hamlet in Northumberland, England

Coordinates: 55.397°N 1.978°W

Unthank
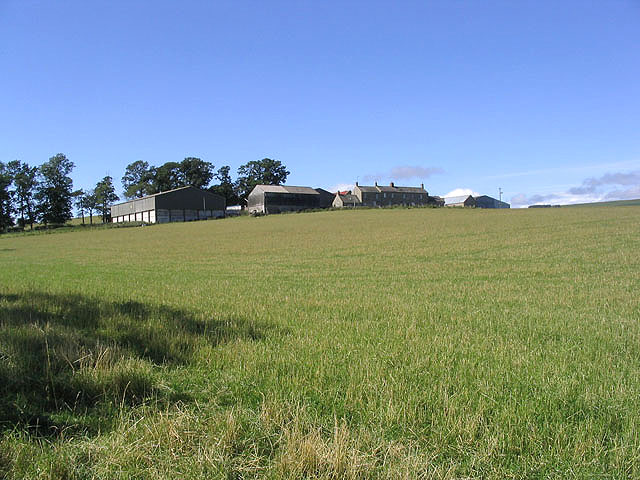
- Unthank Farm

- Location within Northumberland
- OS grid reference: NU015115
- Civil parish: Alnham
- Unitary authority: Northumberland
- Shire county: Northumberland
- Region: North East
- Country: England
- Sovereign state: United Kingdom
- Post town: ALNWICK
- Postcode district: NE66
- Police: Northumbria
- Fire: Northumberland
- Ambulance: North East
- UK Parliament: Berwick-upon-Tweed

Unthank is a hamlet and former civil parish, now in the parish of Alnham in Northumberland, England. In 1951 the parish had a population of 11.

== History ==
It is first mentioned in writing as Unthanc in 1207, and in its current orthography in 1242. Unthank is a deserted medieval village that was last referred to in documents in 1726. Unthank was a township in Alnham parish. From 1866 Unthank was a civil parish in its own right until it was merged with Alnham on 1 April 1955.

== Governance ==
Unthank is in the parliamentary constituency of Berwick-upon-Tweed.
