= Castle Morpeth =

Former borough in England

Coordinates: 55°09′15″N 1°41′14″W

Borough of Castle Morpeth
- Former borough

- Shown within Northumberland
- Sovereign state: United Kingdom
- Constituent country: England
- Region: North East England
- Administrative county: Northumberland
- Founded: 1 April 1974
- Abolished: 1 April 2009
- Admin. HQ: Morpeth

Government
  - Type: Castle Morpeth Borough Council
  - Leadership: Alternative – Sec.31
- Time zone: UTC+0 (Greenwich Mean Time)
  - Summer (DST): UTC+1 (British Summer Time)
- ONS code: 35UE
- Ethnicity: 98.1% White
- Website: castlemorpeth.gov.uk

Castle Morpeth was a local government district with borough status in Northumberland, England. Its administrative centre was the town of Morpeth. The district had a resident population of 49,001 according to the 2001 census.

The district was formed on 1 April 1974 by the merger of the borough of Morpeth and Morpeth Rural District, along with part of Castle Ward Rural District.

The district council was abolished as part of the 2009 structural changes to local government in England effective from 1 April 2009 with responsibilities being transferred to Northumberland County Council, a unitary authority.

== Settlements and parishes ==
The district includes the settlements and parishes of (towns highlighted in bold):

- Belsay
- Capheaton, Cresswell
- East Chevington, Ellington and Linton
- Hartburn, Hebron, Heddon-on-the-Wall, Hepscott
- Longhirst, Longhorsley, Lynemouth
- Matfen, Meldon, Mitford, **Morpeth**
- Netherwitton
- Pegswood, Ponteland
- Stamfordham, Stannington, Stobswood
- Thirston
- Ulgham
- Wallington Demesne, Whalton, Widdrington
- Tritlington and West Chevington
- Widdrington Station and Stobswood

== Transport ==
Castle Morpeth is located along the vital East Coast Main Line rail artery stretching from London to Edinburgh. The rail line offers services to other major intermediate cities such as Newcastle and Peterborough.

== Mayors ==
- 1974–75: Dr George Cormack
- 1975–76: Geoffrey F. Brown
- 1976–77: J Dalton Hutchinson
- 1977–78: W. Laurie Hill
- 1978–79: Tom Brown
- 1979–80: David Adams
- 1980–81: Mrs M. Alice Rowe
- 1981–82: W. John Lough
- 1982–83: Geoffrey F. Brown
- 1983–84: Miss Isobel Smail [
- 1984–85: M. George Green
- 1985–86: Mrs Dorothy McBryde
- 1986–87: Barnaby J. Dunn
- 1987–88: Iain McConnell-Wood
- 1988–89: Ian Hunter (Honorary Alderman 1999)
- 1989–90: Roger Errington (High Sheriff of Northumberland 1993)
- 1990–91: Clive Temple
- 1991–92: Jim Turnbull
- 1992–93: Trevor Hulbert
- 1993–94: M. George Green (2nd term)
- 1994–95: Iain McConnell-Wood (2nd term)
- 1995–96: Tom Simpson (Honorary Alderman 2003)
- 1996–97: Mrs Kay Morris
- 1997–98: Mrs Sheila Campbell (Honorary Alderman 2005)
- 1998–99: Neil Weatherly (Honorary Alderman 2003)
- 1999–2000: Ernie Coe (Honorary Alderman 2008)
- 2000–01: Frank Harrington (Honorary Alderman 2009)
- 2001–02: Bill Cuthbertson
- 2002–03: Alan Taylor
- 2003–04: Derek Thompson
- 2004–05: Mrs Kay Morris (2nd term, Honorary Alderman 2009)
- 2005–06: Milburn Douglas
- 2006–07: Geoff Proudlock (Honorary Alderman 2008)
- 2007–08: Milburn Douglas (2nd term, Honorary Alderman 2009)
- 2008–09: Mrs Irene Brumwell

Irene Brumwell became the last Mayor of Castle Morpeth Borough as structural changes to local government in England effective on 1 April 2009 abolished the borough.

== See also ==
- Castle Morpeth Borough Council elections
