= Abberwick =

Hamlet in Northumberland, England

Coordinates: 55.415°N 1.804°W

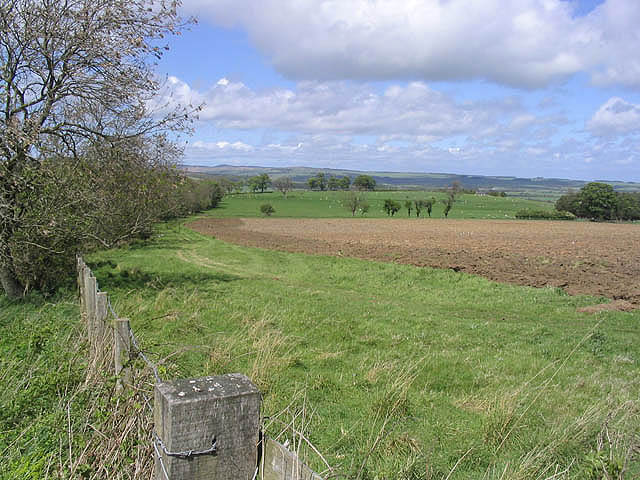
- Near Abberwick, looking north

- Location within Northumberland
- OS grid reference: NU125135
- Civil parish: Edlingham
- Unitary authority: Northumberland
- Ceremonial county: Northumberland
- Region: North East
- Country: England
- Sovereign state: United Kingdom
- Post town: ALNWICK
- Postcode district: NE66
- Police: Northumbria
- Fire: Northumberland
- Ambulance: North East
- UK Parliament: Berwick-upon-Tweed

Abberwick is a hamlet near the River Aln, in the civil parish of Edlingham, in the English county of Northumberland.

== History ==
The name is derived from Old English 'Alubeorht's or Alu(h)burg's dairy farm' (Alubeorht or Alu(h)burg + wīc). It was recorded as Alburwic in 1169, Alber- or Alburckwick in 1278, Awberwyke in 1428, Averwick in 1610 and Abberwick from 1689.

Abberwick is also a deserted medieval village. In the mid-19th century, Abberwick comprised four farms, a corn mill and a few houses. The population was 99 people in 1801, 142 in 1811, 125 in 1821, 135 in 1831, 170 in 1841 and 148 in 1851. It had an area of 1,678 acres and was the property of Bryan Burrell of Broom Park.

== Governance ==
Abberwick is in the parliamentary constituency of Berwick-upon-Tweed. Abberwick was formerly a township in Edlingham parish, from 1866 Abberwick was a civil parish in its own right until it was abolished on 1 April 1955 and merged with Edlingham. In 1951 the parish had a population of 44.
