= Benthall, Northumberland =

Village in Northumberland, England

Coordinates: 55.551°N 1.624°W

Benthall
- Location within Northumberland
- OS grid reference: NU237287
- Unitary authority: Northumberland
- Ceremonial county: Northumberland
- Region: North East
- Country: England
- Sovereign state: United Kingdom
- Post town: CHATHILL
- Postcode district: NE67
- Dialling code: 01665
- Police: Northumbria
- Fire: Northumberland
- Ambulance: North East
- UK Parliament: Berwick-upon-Tweed

Benthall is a village in Northumberland, England. It is about 6 km (3.7 mi) south east of Bamburgh, on the North Sea coast, and 1 km (0.6 mi) south east of Beadnell.

A daymark is being installed in Benthall, as a draw to increase tourism spending.

== Governance ==
Benthall is in the parliamentary constituency of Berwick-upon-Tweed.
