= Unthank, Haltwhistle =

Village in Northumberland, England

Coordinates: 54.956°N 2.431°W

Unthank
- Location within Northumberland
- OS grid reference: NY725625
- Unitary authority: Northumberland
- Ceremonial county: Northumberland
- Region: North East
- Country: England
- Sovereign state: United Kingdom
- Post town: HALTWHISTLE
- Postcode district: NE49
- Dialling code: 01434
- Police: Northumbria
- Fire: Northumberland
- Ambulance: North East
- UK Parliament: Hexham

Unthank is a village near Haltwhistle in Northumberland, England. It is first mentioned in writing as Unthanc around 1200.

== Governance ==
Unthank is in the parliamentary constituency of Hexham.

== Landmarks ==
Unthank Hall is a Grade II listed mansion house, now serving as commercial offices, situated on the southern bank of the River South Tyne. The house, which was built in the 16th century, incorporating an ancient Pele tower, was substantially remodelled and extended in 1815. The Hall was later rebuilt between 1862 and 1865. Much of the 1865 house has since between demolished and only the central gables and entrance porch survive.
