= Birling, Northumberland =

Former civil parish in Northumberland, England

Coordinates: 55.353°N 1.608°W

Birling
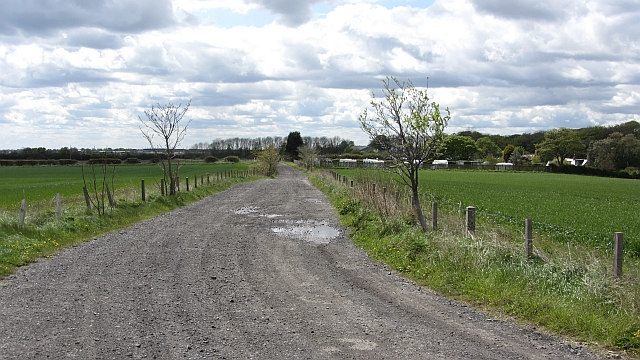

- Location within Northumberland
- OS grid reference: NU249065
- Civil parish: Warkworth
- Unitary authority: Northumberland
- Ceremonial county: Northumberland
- Region: North East
- Country: England
- Sovereign state: United Kingdom
- Post town: MORPETH
- Postcode district: NE65
- Dialling code: 01665
- Police: Northumbria
- Fire: Northumberland
- Ambulance: North East
- UK Parliament: Berwick-upon-Tweed

Birling is a small settlement in the civil parish of Warkworth, in the county of Northumberland, England. It is situated immediately to the north of the village of Warkworth on the A1068, separated from Warkworth by the River Coquet. There are facilities for static and touring caravans at Birling. To the east are Warkworth Golf Club, Birling Links and beach.

Birling Manor, an 18th-century house, with an extension dated 1752, is a Grade II listed building. The 19th century coach house and 18th century hen house, associated with Birling Manor, are also both listed buildings.

== Governance ==
Birling is in the parliamentary constituency of Berwick-upon-Tweed. Birling was formerly a township in Warkworth parish, from 1866 Birling was a civil parish in its own right until it was abolished on 1 April 1955 and merged with Warkworth. In 1951 the parish had a population of 81.
