= Callaly =

Village in Northumberland, England

Coordinates: 55.379°N 1.915°W

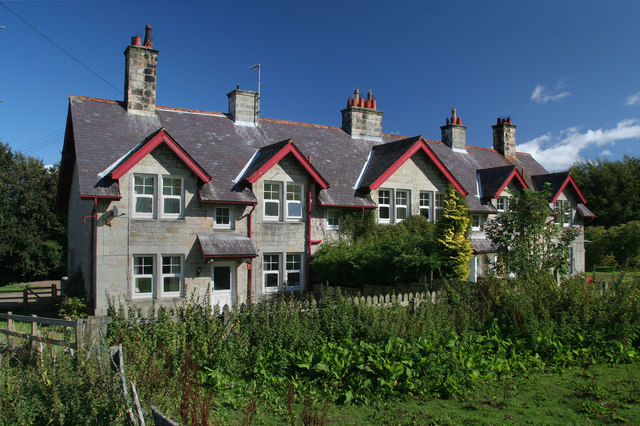

- Location within Northumberland
- Population: 235 (2011 census including Cartington)
- OS grid reference: NU055095
- Unitary authority: Northumberland
- Shire county: Northumberland
- Region: North East
- Country: England
- Sovereign state: United Kingdom
- Post town: ALNWICK
- Postcode district: NE66
- Dialling code: 01665
- Police: Northumbria
- Fire: Northumberland
- Ambulance: North East
- UK Parliament: Berwick-upon-Tweed

Callaly is a village and civil parish in Northumberland, England. It is about 9 miles (14 km) to the west of Alnwick. The main A697 road (to Morpeth) is 3 miles (5 km) away. It is on the line of the Roman road linking the Roman forts of High Rochester to the west and Learchild to the east, where it joins the Devil's Causeway Roman road to the north. The parish includes the hamlets of Lorbottle and Yetlington.

== Governance ==
Callaly is in the parliamentary constituency of Berwick-upon-Tweed. The parish of "Callaly" was formed on 1 April 1955 from Callaly and Yetlington and "Lorbottle".

== Landmarks ==
Callaly Castle, a Grade I listed building, is located just north of the village.

Dancing Hall is located outside of Callaly village.
