= Ewesley railway station =

Former railway station in England

Ewesley
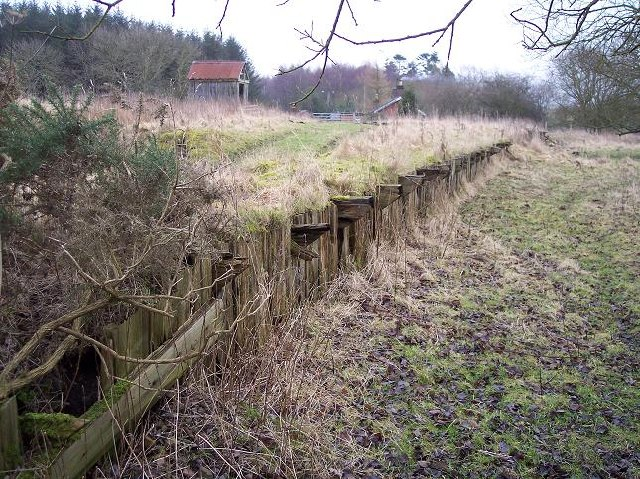
- Platform remains in 2006.

General information
- Location: Fontburn, Northumberland; England
- Coordinates: 55.2284°N 1.9094°W
- Grid reference: NZ059927
- Platforms: 1

Other information
- Status: Disused

History
- Original company: Northumberland Central Railway
- Pre-grouping: North British Railway
- Post-grouping: London and North Eastern Railway; North Eastern Region of British Railways

Key dates
- 19 October 1870: Station opened
- 15 September 1952: Station closed to passengers
- 9 November 1963: Station closed to freight as Ewesley Halt
Location

Ewesley station was a weather board and corrugated iron built railway station in Northumberland on the Rothbury Branch built to serve the local farming settlements.

== History ==
In 1859 Parliament authorised the Wansbeck Railway Company to build the line from Morpeth to Reedsmouth. In 1862 the line from Morpeth to Scotsgap opened.

The next year the Northumberland Central Railway were authorised to construct a line from Scotsgap to Ford on the Berwick to Kelso line. They also were permitted to build a short branch line to Cornhill. Due to financial difficulties the line was to be built in stages starting with the section from Scotsgap to Rothbury which was started in August 1869 and completed by November 1870. The North British Railway and the branch line became part of the London and North Eastern Railway in 1923. In September 1952 passenger services were withdrawn and the line closed in November 1963.

One of the original stations on the branch line Ewesley was constructed in the centre of a circular prehistoric camp. Later in 1894 the only passing loop on the otherwise single track line was constructed at Ewesley. At closure the station had been renamed Ewesley Halt. Although in a bad state of repair the platform remains intact, the station building has been demolished.

Preceding station	Disused railways	Following station
Longwitton; Line and station closed	North British Railway; Rothbury Branch	Fontburn Halt; Line and station closed
