= Fontburn Halt railway station =

Former railway station in England

Fontburn Halt
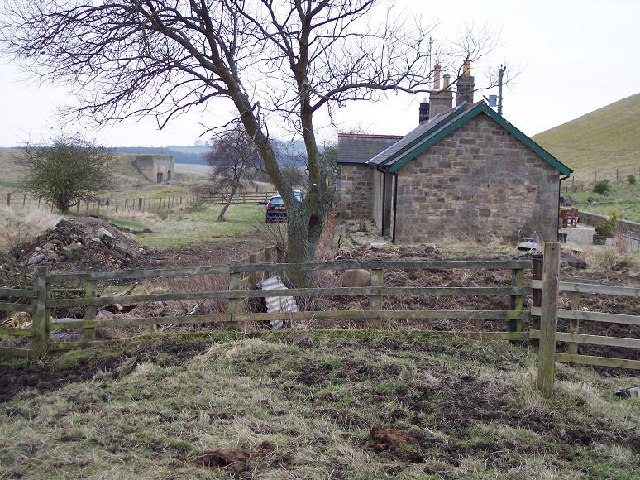
- Station building in 2006.

General information
- Location: Coquetdale, Northumberland; England
- Coordinates: 55.2430°N 1.9224°W
- Grid reference: NZ051942
- Platforms: 1

Other information
- Status: Disused

History
- Original company: North British Railway
- Pre-grouping: North British Railway
- Post-grouping: London and North Eastern Railway; North Eastern Region of British Railways

Key dates
- 1 June 1904: Station opened
- 15 September 1952: Station closed to passengers
- 3 October 1956: Station closed to freight
Location

Fontburn Halt was a weatherboard and corrugated-iron-built railway station in Northumberland, England, on the Rothbury Branch, built to serve the pre-existing Whitehouse lime works and later the Whitehouse Colliery, and quarries.

== History ==
In 1859 Parliament authorised the Wansbeck Railway Company to build the line from Morpeth to Reedsmouth. In 1862 the line from Morpeth to Scotsgap opened.

The next year the Northumberland Central Railway were authorised to construct a line from Scotsgap to Ford on the Berwick to Kelso line. They were also permitted to build a short branch line to Cornhill. Due to financial difficulties the line was to be built in stages starting with the section from Scotsgap to Rothbury which was started in August 1869 and completed by November 1870. The North British Railway and the branch line became part of the London and North Eastern Railway in 1923. In September 1952 passenger services were withdrawn and the line closed in November 1963.

Constructed to serve Whitehouse lime works, the station later had a number of sidings serving various other local industries including the construction of the nearby Fontburn reservoir.

Preceding station	Disused railways	Following station
Ewesley; Line and station closed	North British Railway; Rothbury Branch	Brinkburn; Line and station closed
