= Longwitton railway station =

Former railway station in England

Longwitton

General information
- Location: Rothley, Northumberland; England
- Coordinates: 55.2111°N 1.9298°W
- Grid reference: NZ045908
- Platforms: 1

Other information
- Status: Disused

History
- Original company: Northumberland Central Railway
- Pre-grouping: North British Railway
- Post-grouping: London and North Eastern Railway; North Eastern Region of British Railways

Key dates
- 1 November 1870: Station opened as Rothley private station
- April 1875: renamed Longwitton and became public station
- 15 September 1952: Station closed to passengers
- 11 November 1963: Station closed to freight
Location

Longwitton station was a weather board and corrugated iron built railway station in Northumberland on the Rothbury Branch. Originally known as Rothley and built as a private halt for the Trevelyan Estate, the name was changed in 1875 to Longwitton when it became a public station.

== History ==
In 1859 Parliament authorised the Wansbeck Railway Company to build the line from Morpeth to Reedsmouth. In 1862 the line from Morpeth to Scotsgap opened.

The next year the Northumberland Central Railway were authorised to construct a line from Scotsgap to Ford on the Berwick to Kelso line. They also were permitted to build a short branch line to Cornhill. Due to financial difficulties the line was to be built in stages starting with the section from Scotsgap to Rothbury which was started in August 1869 and completed by November 1870. The North British Railway and the branch line became part of the London and North Eastern Railway in 1923.

The station was opened as Rothley a private station serving the local Trevelyan Estate but became public when the line was absorbed into the North British Railway. Renamed Longwitton in April 1875 the station served a limestone quarry and colliery until the 1920s. On 3 July 1875 a major accident occurred on the line just south of Longwitton leading to the deaths of three people.

In September 1952 passenger services were withdrawn and the line closed in November 1963.

Preceding station	Disused railways	Following station
Scotsgap; Line and station closed	North British Railway; Rothbury Branch	Ewesley; Line and station closed
