= Redesmouth =

Coordinates: 55.134°N 2.212°W

- Location within Northumberland
- OS grid reference: NY865822
- Civil parish: Bellingham
- Unitary authority: Northumberland
- Ceremonial county: Northumberland
- Region: North East
- Country: England
- Sovereign state: United Kingdom
- Post town: HEXHAM
- Postcode district: NE48
- Dialling code: 01434
- Police: Northumbria
- Fire: Northumberland
- Ambulance: North East
- UK Parliament: Hexham

Redesmouth (old spelling: Reedsmouth) is a village in Northumberland, England, just over 1 mile (1.6 km) to the south-east of Bellingham.

== Governance ==
Redesmouth is in the parliamentary constituency of Hexham.

== Transport ==
Redesmouth was served by Reedsmouth railway station on the Border Counties Railway which linked the Newcastle and Carlisle Railway, near Hexham, with the Border Union Railway at Riccarton Junction. The first section of the route was opened between Hexham and Chollerford in 1858, the remainder opening in 1862.Awdry, Christopher (1990). Encyclopaedia of British Railway Companies. Sparkford: Patrick Stephens Ltd. ISBN 1-8526-0049-7. OCLC 19514063. CN 8983. The line was closed to passengers by British Railways in 1956. Part of the line is now beneath the surface of Kielder Water.

Redesmouth was a junction with the Wansbeck Railway, which ran east to Morpeth. The yard at Redesmouth remained open after the closure of the Border Counties line to freight as the Wansbeck route was used to run from Redesmouth to Bellingham. To the north side of the route to Riccarton there was a locomotive shed used to stable historic locomotives during the war to save them from bombing raids. There were two platforms on the Riccarton route and one platform on the Wansbeck route. The substantial station building still stands and both it and the signal box are now private houses. The station building was unusual as, originally, it had a 60,000 gallon water tank on top of it, where the pitched roof is now.
