= Middleton North railway station =

Disused railway station in Northumberland, England

Coordinates: 55.1608°N 1.9009°W

Middleton North
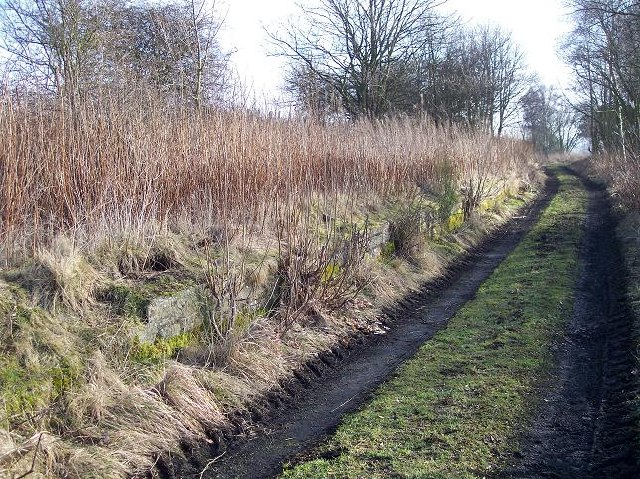
- Station remains in 2006.

General information
- Location: Middleton and Hartburn, Northumberland; England
- Grid reference: NZ065852
- Platforms: 1

Other information
- Status: Disused

History
- Original company: Wansbeck Railway
- Pre-grouping: Wansbeck Railway; North British Railway
- Post-grouping: London and North Eastern Railway; North Eastern Region of British Railways

Key dates
- 23 July 1862: Station opened as Middleton
- 1 July 1923: renamed Middleton North
- 15 September 1952: Station closed to passengers
- 29 September 1966: Station closed to freight
Location

Middleton North was a stone-built railway station on the Wansbeck Railway in Northumberland, England. Between Morpeth and Reedsmouth, it served the villages of Middleton and Hartburn.

== History ==
In 1859 Parliament authorised the Wansbeck Railway Company to build the line from Morpeth to Reedsmouth. Due to financial difficulties the line was built in stages. In 1862 the line from Morpeth to Scotsgap opened, with an extension to Knowesgate opening a year later. At this time the Wansbeck Railway Company amalgamates with the North British Railway. It was only on 1 May 1865 that the line was completed. In 1923 the line and the North British Railway merged with the London and North Eastern Railway.

Little remains of the station today.

Preceding station	Disused railways	Following station
Scotsgap; Line and station closed	North British Railway; Wansbeck Railway	Angerton; Line and station closed
