= Angerton railway station =

Disused railway station in Northumberland, England

Angerton
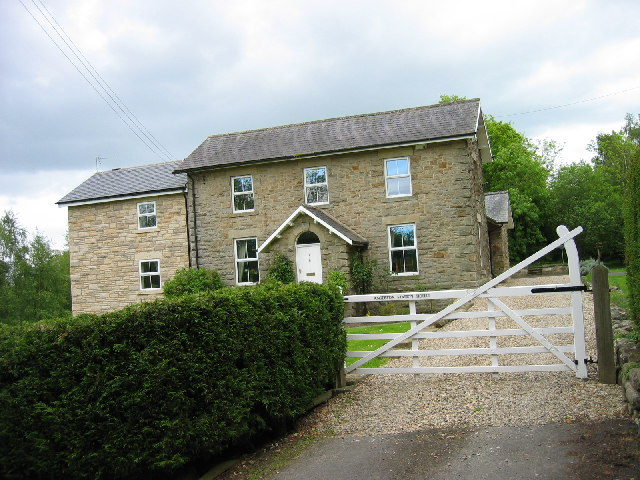

General information
- Location: Low Angerton, Northumberland; England
- Coordinates: 55.150°N 1.865°W
- Grid reference: NZ087839
- Platforms: 1

Other information
- Status: Disused

History
- Original company: Blyth and Tyne (Wansbeck) Railway
- Pre-grouping: North British Railway
- Post-grouping: London and North Eastern Railway; North Eastern Region of British Railways

Key dates
- 23 July 1862: Station opens
- 15 September 1952: Station closes
Location

Angerton was a railway station serving the village of Low Angerton in Northumberland, Northern England. It was located on the Wansbeck Railway, which diverged from the East Coast Main Line at Morpeth and joined the Border Counties Railway at Reedsmouth Junction.

== History ==
Opened by the Blyth and Tyne (Wansbeck) Railway, which was taken over by the North British Railway, it became part of the London and North Eastern Railway during the Grouping of 1923. The station then passed to the Eastern Region of British Railways upon nationalisation in 1948 and was closed in 1952 by British Railways.

== The site today ==
The station house is now in private hands and has been extended, and the platform still exists. The trackbed of the old route can be followed West on foot, following the meandering River Wansbeck until it reaches a double arched stone bridge. A single solitary lineside telegraph pole can be seen along the route and the trackside fences have clearly been made using railway sleepers reclaimed once the line had shut.

Preceding station	Disused railways	Following station
Middleton North; Line and station closed	North British Railway; Wansbeck Railway	Meldon; Line and station closed
