= Knowesgate railway station =

Disused railway station in Northumberland, England

Coordinates: 55.167°N 2.018°W

Knowesgate
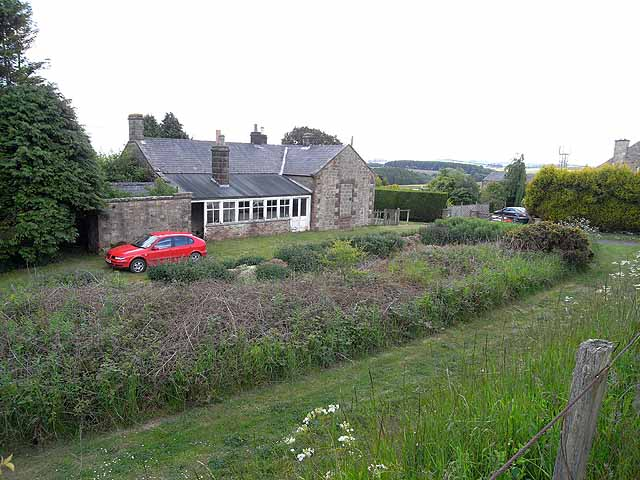
- The site of the station in 2009

General information
- Location: Kirkwhelpington, Northumberland; England
- Grid reference: NY989858
- Platforms: 2

Other information
- Status: Disused

History
- Original company: North British Railway
- Pre-grouping: North British Railway
- Post-grouping: London and North Eastern Railway; North Eastern Region of British Railways

Key dates
- 7 July 1864: Station opened.
- 15 September 1952: Station closed to passengers
- 29 September 1966: Station closed to freight
Location

Knowesgate was a stone-built railway station with goods sidings in Northumberland, England on the Wansbeck Railway between Morpeth and Reedsmouth, which served the village of Kirkwhelpington.

== History ==
In 1859 Parliament authorised the Wansbeck Railway Company to build the line from Morpeth to Reedsmouth. Due to financial difficulties the line was built in stages. In 1862 the line from Morpeth to Scotsgap opened, with an extension to Knowesgate opening in 1864. At this time the Wansbeck Railway Company amalgamates with the North British Railway. It was only on 1 May 1865 that the line was completed. In 1923 the line and the North British Railway merged with the London and North Eastern Railway.

The station was opened in 1865. In September 1952 passenger services were withdrawn from the line, and the goods service from much of the line in November 1963. The station was closed completely with the line on 3 October 1966. The station buildings remain as a private residence.

Preceding station	Disused railways	Following station
Woodburn; Line and station closed	North British Railway; Wansbeck Railway	Scotsgap; Line and station closed
