= Tarset railway station =

Disused railway station in Tarset, Northumberland

Tarset
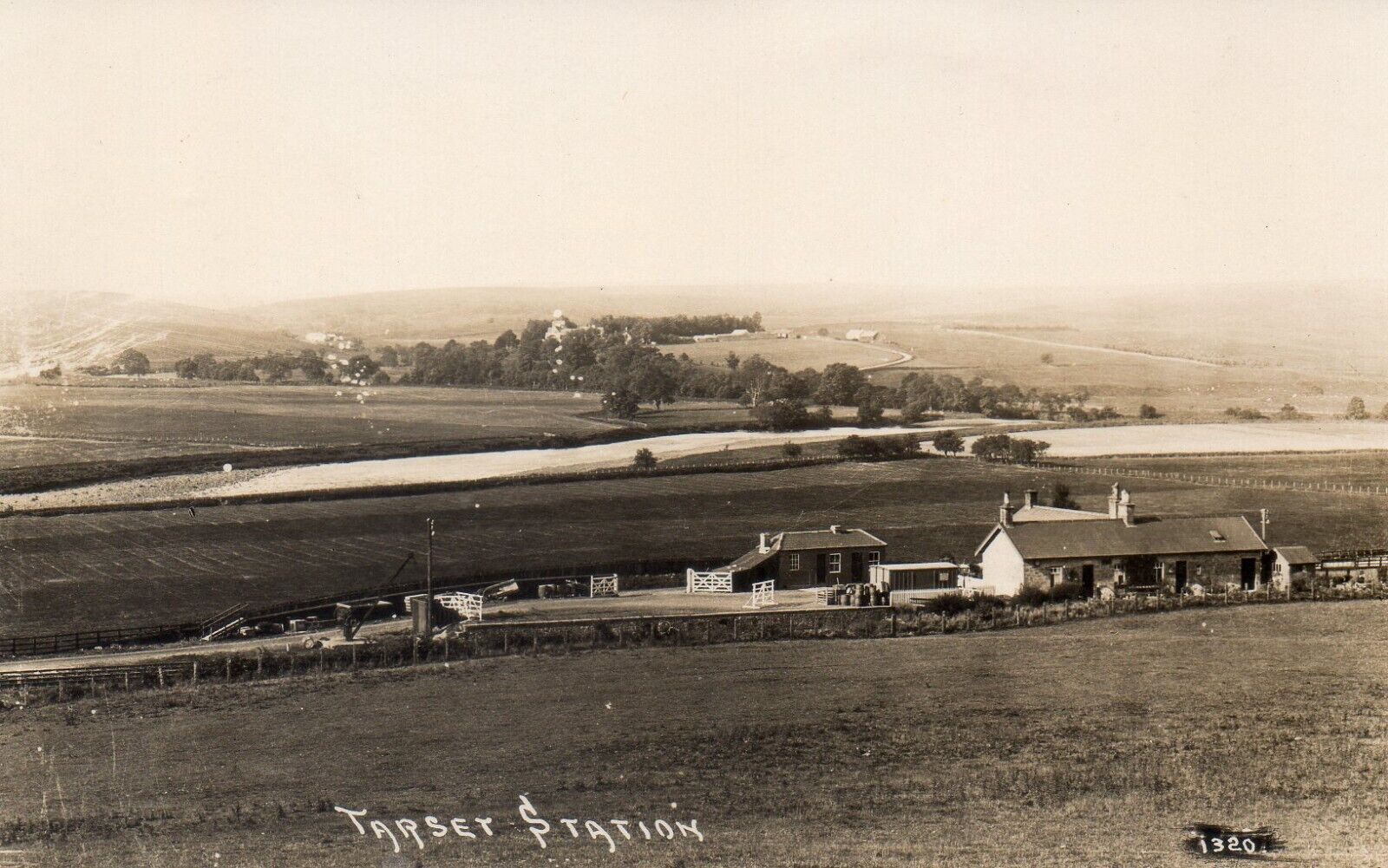

General information
- Location: Tarset, Northumberland; England
- Coordinates: 55.161603°N 2.331948°W
- Grid reference: NY790852
- Platforms: 1

Other information
- Status: Disused

History
- Original company: North British Railway
- Post-grouping: British Railways (North Eastern)

Key dates
- 1 February 1862: Opened
- 9 September 1955: Name changed to Tarset Halt
- 15 October 1956: Closed to passengers
- 1 September 1958: Closed completely
Location

Tarset railway station served the civil parish of Tarset, Northumberland, England from 1862 to 1958 on the Border Counties Railway.

== History ==
The station was opened on 1 February 1862 by the North British Railway.

It was situated at the end of an approach road and half a mile southwest of the hamlet of Lanehead. The platform was on the down side with a siding and goods dock. There was a two-ton crane on the dock and the station was able to cope with most sorts of goods including vehicles and livestock.

The station was host to a LNER camping coach from 1936 to 1939.

The station was downgraded to an unstaffed halt on 9 September 1955 when it was renamed Tarset Halt.

The station closed to passengers on 15 October 1956 and completely on 1 September 1958.

Preceding station	Disused railways	Following station
Thorneyburn; Line and station closed	North British Railway; Border Counties Railway	Charlton (Northumberland); Line and station closed
