= Angerton =

Angerton may refer to several places:

- Angerton, Cumberland, Cumbria, England
- Angerton, Westmorland and Furness, Cumbria, England
- Angerton railway station, Low Angerton, Northumberland, England
- High Angerton, hamlet and former civil parish in Northumberland, England
- Low Angerton, hamlet and former civil parish in Northumberland, England
