= Charlton (Northumberland) railway station =

Disused railway station in Charlton, Northumberland

Charlton

General information
- Location: Charlton, Northumberland; England
- Coordinates: 55.1563°N 2.2996°W
- Grid reference: NY810843
- Platforms: 1

Other information
- Status: Disused

History
- Original company: North British Railway
- Pre-grouping: North British Railway

Key dates
- 1 February 1861: Opened
- 1 October 1862: Closed
Location

Charlton railway station served the village of Charlton, Northumberland, England from 1861 to 1862 on the Border Counties Railway.

== History ==
The station was opened on 1 February 1861 by the North British Railway. The station was situated on a lane from Bellingham to Lanehead to the east of the bridge south of Charlton. The platform was made of timber and there was a siding 200 yards east. The station was short-lived, as it was only open for one year and eight months. The siding survived for a bit longer.

Preceding station	Disused railways	Following station
Tarset; Line and station closed	North British Railway; Border Counties Railway	Bellingham North Tyne; Line and station closed
