= Bellingham North Tyne railway station =

Disused railway station in Bellingham, England

Bellingham North Tyne
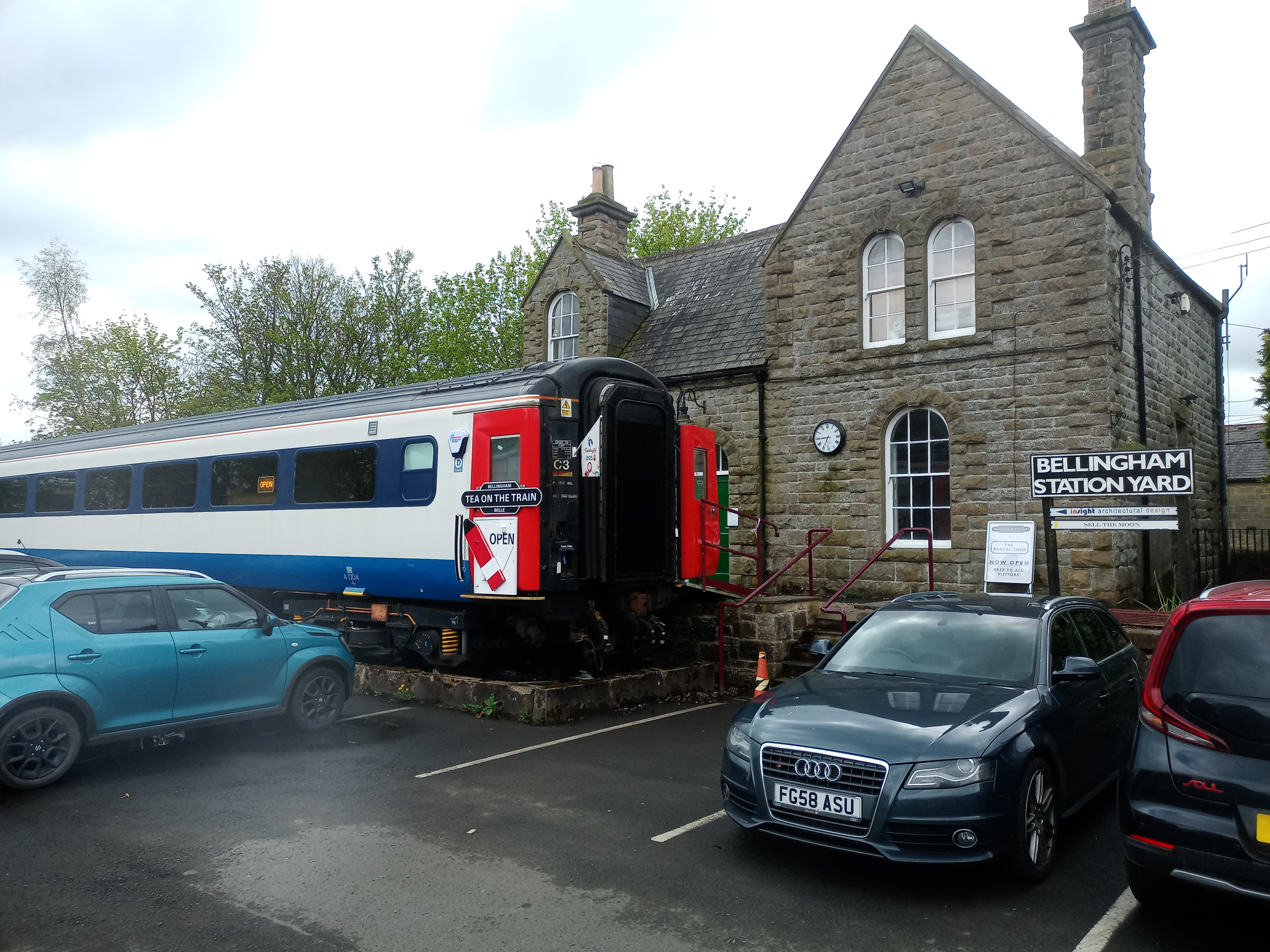

General information
- Location: Bellingham, Northumberland; England
- Coordinates: 55.1438°N 2.2493°W
- Grid reference: NY842833
- Platforms: 2

Other information
- Status: Disused

History
- Original company: North British Railway
- Pre-grouping: North British Railway
- Post-grouping: LNER British Railways (North Eastern)

Key dates
- 1 February 1861: Opened
- 15 October 1956: Closed to passengers
- 11 November 1963: Closed completely
Location

Bellingham railway station served the village of Bellingham, Northumberland, England from 1861 to 1963 on the Border Counties Railway.

== History ==
The station opened on 1 February 1861 by the North British Railway. The station was situated near the eastern edge of Bellingham village with the roadside entrance on the north side of Redesmouth Road. It was originally known as Bellingham but the name was changed to Bellingham North Tyne by the LNER to avoid confusion with the station in Lewisham. The goods yard was opposite the platform and consisted of two sidings, the outer loop serving a goods dock which was served end on by a short siding from the loop. The yard had a three-ton crane. The station closed to passengers on 15 October 1956 but was still served by excursions until it closed to goods traffic on 11 November 1963. The site of the goods yard is now Bellingham Heritage Centre after it was relocated in 2000. In 2009–10 two carriages from an ex-Southern Region multiple unit were installed alongside the northbound platform to serve as a restaurant ( DTSOs nos. 76301 & 76302 from 4TC unit no. 417 ).

Preceding station	Disused railways	Following station
Charlton (Northumberland); Line and station closed	North British Railway; Border Counties Railway	Reedsmouth; Line and station closed
