= Woodburn railway station =

Disused railway station in Northumberland, England

Coordinates: 55.1682°N 2.1609°W

Woodburn
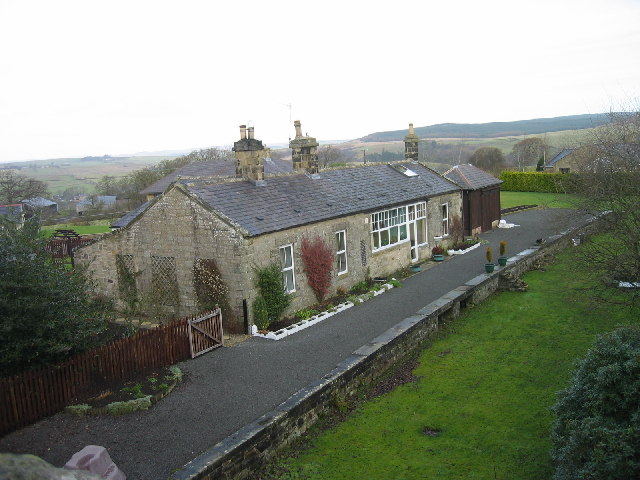

General information
- Location: West Woodburn and East Woodburn, Northumberland; England
- Grid reference: NY898860
- Platforms: 1

Other information
- Status: Disused

History
- Original company: Wansbeck Railway
- Pre-grouping: Wansbeck Railway Company; North British Railway
- Post-grouping: London and North Eastern Railway; North Eastern Region of British Railways

Key dates
- 1865: Station opened
- 13 September 1952: Station closed to passengers
- 3 October 1966: Station closed to freight
Location

Woodburn was a stone-built railway station with substantial goods sidings in Northumberland, on the Wansbeck Railway between Morpeth and Reedsmouth. It served the villages of West and East Woodburn plus a local military camp.

== History ==
In 1859 Parliament authorised the Wansbeck Railway Company to build the line from Morpeth to Reedsmouth. Due to financial difficulties the line was built in stages. In 1862 the line from Morpeth to Scotsgap opened, with an extension to Knowesgate opening a year later. At this time the Wansbeck Railway Company amalgamates with the North British Railway. It was only on 1 May 1865 that the line was completed. In 1923 the line and the North British Railway merged with the London and North Eastern Railway.

The station was opened in 1865. In September 1952 passenger services were withdrawn from the line, and the goods service from much of the line in November 1963. The line was closed completely in the October 1966 with the station being closed on 3 October 1966. The station building and platform remain as a private residence.

Preceding station	Disused railways	Following station
Reedsmouth; Line and station closed	North British Railway; Wansbeck Railway	Knowesgate; Line and station closed
