= Charlton railway station (disambiguation) =

Charlton railway station is a railway station in south east London.

Charlton railway station may also refer to:

- Charlton railway station, Victoria, Australia
- Charlton (Northumberland) railway station, England
- Charlton Halt railway station (Bristol), England
- Charlton Halt railway station (Oxfordshire), England
