= Rothbury Branch =

The Rothbury Branch was a 13-mile single track railway line in Northumberland, England. It was built by the Northumberland Central Railway and was conceived as part of an alternative trunk route from Newcastle to Berwick.

There were serious problems raising money for the ambitious scheme, and it was scaled back to run from Scotsgap to Rothbury. It opened in 1870. Even so, it was always short of money and had to request the North British Railway to take it over, along with its debt, which was effected in 1872.

The line was never busy and closure to passenger traffic took place in 1952; after a period of limited goods operation, the line closed completely in 1963.

== History ==
=== Early proposals ===
In 1847, the Newcastle and Berwick Railway started operation. It was created by George Hudson, the so-called Railway King, and his intention was to form part of a through railway connection from Edinburgh to London. The Newcastle and Berwick Railway later became part of the York, Newcastle and Berwick Railway.

The people of Rothbury saw the advantage of having a railway connection; the district had long been a centre for the production of lime, important in improving acidic soil for agricultural purposes, and Morpeth was a centre of demand for the mineral. It was natural to consider making a railway branch line from Rothbury to Morpeth, which was on the Newcastle and Berwick main line.

A scheme for a railway was developed, and an estimate was prepared for the construction: it would cost £95,000. However, despite the local enthusiasm, there was inadequate financial support for the scheme and it was dropped.

=== The Wansbeck Railway ===
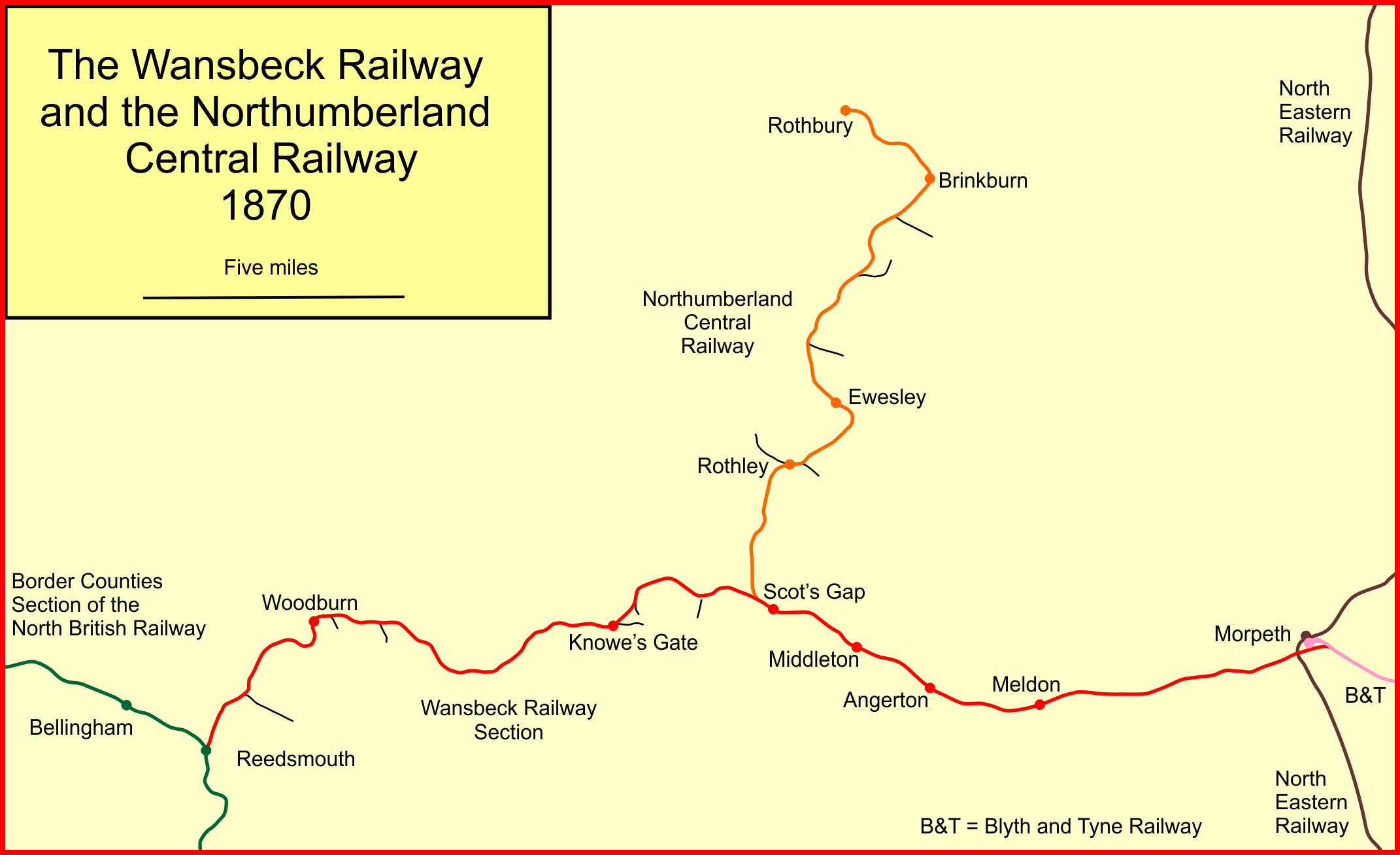
The Rothbury branch and the Wansbeck Railway

The Border Counties Railway opened the first section of its line in 1858. This line was to link Hexham with apparently rich mineral deposits, and was stated to be the first stage of a new line, independent of Hudson's York, Newcastle and Berwick Railway, linking the area with Edinburgh. That revived consideration of a railway running west from Morpeth, which led to the development of a scheme for a Wansbeck Valley Railway from Morpeth to Reedsmouth on the Border Counties line.

The Wansbeck Valley committee changed the name to the Wansbeck Railway, and obtained royal assent for the Wansbeck Railway Act 1859 (22 & 23 Vict. c. lxxxv) authorising their line on 8 August 1859; the capital was set at £120,000.

They constructed their line in stages, and it opened in sections from 1862 to 1865. It passed through Scotsgap, but came no closer to Rothbury. The company was constantly short of money and was heavily supported by the North British Railway, which saw it as a strategic means of by-passing Hudson's railways in getting access to Newcastle.

=== The Northumberland Central Railway ===
Rothbury was still an important centre for the production of lime, but the lack of a railway connection was felt more keenly than ever, and during the construction of the Wansbeck Railway, a scheme was brought forward to build a 45-mile (72 km) line from Scotsgap northwards through Rothbury and Wooler to Cornhill, near to Berwick on the Kelso line of the North Eastern Railway. The line would need capital of £260,000 to construct, and the terrain to be crossed north of Rothbury was very thinly populated. Although the promoters must have understood that the Wansbeck line only continued with the support of the NBR, they were evidently undeterred. In fact, the Wansbeck Railway was absorbed by the NBR on 21 July 1863.

A parliamentary bill for the line, to be called the Northumberland Central Railway, was submitted for the 1863 session. A cash deposit of £20,800 was required to do so, but the cash available to the provisional company was inadequate, so three individuals, including Richard Hodgson of the NBR, provided the money themselves.

Northumberland Central Railway Act 1863
- Act of Parliament
- Parliament of the United Kingdom
- Long title: An Act for making Railways in the County of Northumberland from the Wansbeck Railway in the Parish of Hartburn to the Parish of Ford, and thence to the Berwick and Kelso Branch of the North-eastern Railway; and for other Purposes.
- Citation: 26 & 27 Vict. c. ccxxxv

Dates
- Royal assent: 28 July 1863

Text of statute as originally enacted

The Northumberland Central Railway Act 1863 (26 & 27 Vict. c. ccxxxv) received royal assent on 28 July 1863; capital was £270,000.

The act (as it now was) merely authorised the capital; actually raising it was a problem for the company. A provisional contract with Warings, a reputable London-based contractor, was finalised, but the absence of money prevented a start. A call on subscribers brought in some money, and debate raged as to whether construction should be from the Scotsgap end or the northern end. Warings was pressed to consider courses of action that would have disadvantaged the firm and, given the absence of ready money, it saw that the contract was vain, and asked to be relieved of it. The company was unable to provide money to make a start, and on 7 August 1865, a difficult shareholders' meeting took place, which ended with agreement to abandon the proposed line north of Rothbury. The eclipse of Richard Hodgson as chairman of the North British Railway was significant in the loss of commitment to the northward extension.

=== A Rothbury branch line ===
Northumberland Central Railway Act 1867
- Act of Parliament
- Parliament of the United Kingdom
- Long title: An Act to authorize the Northumberland Central Railway Company to abandon a Portion of their authorized Line; and for other Purposes.
- Citation: 30 & 31 Vict. c. ix

Dates
- Royal assent: 12 April 1867

Text of statute as originally enacted

The contract with Dowlings was cancelled, and a local contractor, Dowson, was given the task of building from Scotsgap to Rothbury. On 12 April 1867, the company received the Northumberland Central Railway Act 1867 (30 & 31 Vict. c. ix) authority to shorten the scheme, making it simply a branch line to Rothbury, with authorised capital of £75,000.

The difficulty in raising that money was no less acute, and became impossible to continue. Dowson had to discontinue the work, which was hardly started. In February 1868, the directors all offered their resignation in view of the impossible situation; a number of financial devices to get the money had been tried, all of them in vain. Most directors were persuaded to continue. However, by the end of 1868 it had proved possible to scrape together enough money to instruct Dowson to restart work.

However, in August 1870, it was stated that the construction was nearly complete. The NBR had been approached to work the line for the company, but the terms were stated to be unacceptable, and the Blyth and Tyne Railway were to be approached to do so. Since running to Morpeth required the permission of the NBR, it was unlikely that arrangement would work, and in fact the NBR working arrangement was later accepted.

=== Opening at last ===
On 1 November 1870, the line opened to the public, the directors having travelled over the line the previous day.

The steepest gradient was said to be 1 in 60 and there was a twelve-arch viaduct at Fontburn. There were stations at Rothbury, Brinkburn, Ewesley and Scotsgap, and a private platform at Rothley for the use of the Trevelyan Estates. The Rothley platform was later renamed Longwitton and made public.

The working arrangement with the NBR was considered onerous by the Northumberland Central directors, but there was no alternative. Operations made a small profit in the early weeks, but that soon turned to a loss. The line had cost £95,000 to build, (Note: Sewell, page 85, quoting the Company Engineer at a Shareholders' Meeting of 21 August 1871; Ross says £54,000 on page 79.) and the Company owed £9,600 to contractors, as well as having incurred heavy debenture debts and issued preference shares, and it was obvious that financial disaster was imminent.

=== Absorbed by the North British Railway ===
The only way out was a sale to the NBR, which was agreed at a meeting in Newcastle on 23 February 1872, although fiercely opposed by a section of shareholders. The NBR paid off the £9,600 debt, and ordinary shares were to be guaranteed 1% until 1878. The NBR acquired the line for about 10% of its cost. (Note: Sewell, page 85, presumably on the arithmetic that the £9,600 was about 10% of the £95,000 construction cost.) That was implied (Note: By Sewell, page 85, and Ross, page93.) to be a considerable bargain for the NBR. A prominent Northumberland Central Railway shareholder was reported as saying, at the final shareholders' meeting, that the NBR was being made a present of the line. However, the NBR acquired a bankrupt, loss-making business, paid its £9,600 immediate debts, paid 3% mortgages taken out by the NCR, and paid 1% on worthless NCR stock for seven years. (Note: Sewell and Ross give contradictory details of the share conversion.)

The acquisition was formalised by the North British Railway Act 1872 (35 & 36 Vict. c. cxxiii) of 18 July 1872. (Note: Sewell says 1 February but that must refer to a shareholders' meeting or other internal decision.)

=== Longwitton accident of 1875 ===
There was a serious accident near Longwitton on 3 July 1875. A passenger train was running down the steep gradient towards Scotsgap, with eight empty stone wagons marshalled in front of the passenger coaches, when the drawbar of one of the wagons broke away. Digging into the track, it derailed the vehicles behind it, and they plunged down an embankment; four people lost their lives.

The Board of Trade inspecting officer, Col F H Rich commented,

The engine-driver and fireman were not aware that they had left the greater part of their train behind ... The fireman's attention was first drawn to the circumstance by three ladies, Misses Winship, who were standing in a field on the east side of the line, close to the railway fence, and who, on observing the train running over the bank, called and waved their arms as violently as they could to attract the attention of the engine-driver. The young ladies proceeded at once to give all the assistance they could to the injured passengers ...

=== Under the North British Railway ===
A cattle market was established in Rothbury in 1871, and development of the town for residential and holiday purposes, as well as the provision of a racecourse, improved the financial situation of the line. Nonetheless, the two-hour journey time from Newcastle was a significant negative factor.

The passenger train service settled down to three trains each way daily, aligned towards Morpeth. Although journeys from Rothbury towards Reedsmouth and beyond were possible, connections at Scotsgap were not good.

In 1873, very considerable deposits of lime and coal, as well as fireclay, started to be exploited at Longwitton. That brought large volumes of mineral traffic to the line, and the prospects looked extremely good. However, the extraction company suddenly surrendered its lease in 1886 and, except for a small amount of quarry working, the minerals were no longer brought to the surface.

=== The twentieth century ===
In February 1902, Tynemouth Corporation requested a siding connection to assist in the construction of Fontburn Reservoir. The siding was provided and a temporary platform costing £180 opened on 12 January 1903, for the use of workers. It was named White House at first but then Fontburn (or "Fontburn (Halt)"), and it later became a public station.

The main line railways of Great Britain were "grouped" by the government under the Railways Act 1921, and the North British Railway was a constituent of the new London and North Eastern Railway.

During World War II the passenger train service was reduced to two return trips daily, but from 1945, a mid-day service from Rothbury to Scotsgap and return was included.

After the railways were nationalised by the government in 1948, the Rothbury line became part of the Scottish Region of British Railways. (Note: Although it was in England, the existing mid-level management structure was the successor to the North British Railway section of the LNER, and management disruption was avoided by this arrangement: Sewell, page 117.)

Increasingly efficient road transport caused a collapse of the passenger and goods traffic, and closure was inevitable. The last passenger trains ran on 13 September 1952. A basic weekly goods service continued but, on 9 November 1963, the Rothbury line was closed completely.

== Topography ==
The line climbed at 1 in 67 from Scotsgap to a summit at Longwitton, then falling on the same ruling gradient to Rothbury.

Locations on the line were:

Station	Opened	Closed	Notes
Scotsgap	23 July 1862	29 September 1966	junction station on the Wansbeck Railway
Longwitton	1 November 1870	9 November 1963	renamed from Rothley to Longwitton in 1875
Ewesley	1 November 1870	9 November 1963	temporarily closed 3 October–21 November 1921
Fontburn	1 June 1904	15 September 1952	temporarily closed 3 October–21 November 1921
Brinkburn	1 November 1870	9 November 1963	
Rothbury	1 November 1870	9 November 1963	temporarily closed 3 October–21 November 1921. The goods yard was used for race excursions before 1899; later there was a separate race platform.
