= Hepscott railway station =

Disused railway station in Hepscott, Northumberland

Hepscott
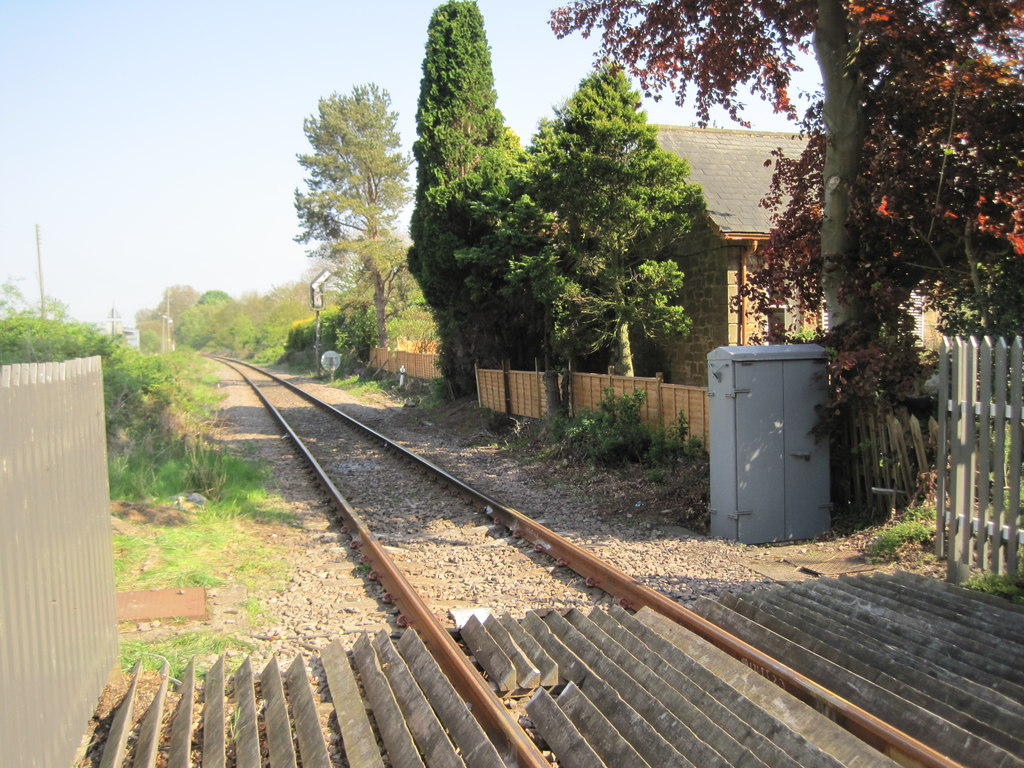
- The site of the station in 2010

General information
- Location: Hepscott, Northumberland; England
- Coordinates: 55.1539°N 1.6524°W
- Grid reference: NZ222844
- Platforms: 2

Other information
- Status: Disused

History
- Original company: North Eastern Railway
- Post-grouping: LNER; British Railways (North Eastern)

Key dates
- 1 April 1858: Opened
- 3 April 1950: Closed to passengers
- 9 March 1964: Closed completely
Location

Hepscott railway station served the village of Hepscott, Northumberland, England, from 1858 to 1964 on the Blyth and Tyne Railway.

== History ==
The station opened on 1 April 1858 by the North Eastern Railway. It was situated at the level crossing east of the line at the north side of the village. The station was the first on the line to have two platforms, although the down platform was disused in 1914. The station closed to passengers on 3 April 1950 and closed to goods traffic on 9 March 1964.

Preceding station	Disused railways	Following station
Choppington; Line open, station closed	North Eastern Railway; Blyth and Tyne Railway	Morpeth; Original Line and station closed. Subsequently used line and station open
