= Charlton, Northumberland =

Village in Northumberland, England

Coordinates: 55.163°N 2.308°W

Charlton
- Location within Northumberland
- OS grid reference: NY805855
- Unitary authority: Northumberland
- Ceremonial county: Northumberland
- Region: North East
- Country: England
- Sovereign state: United Kingdom
- Post town: HEXHAM
- Postcode district: NE48
- Dialling code: 01434
- Police: Northumbria
- Fire: Northumberland
- Ambulance: North East
- UK Parliament: Hexham

Charlton is a village in Northumberland, England. It is about 1.5 miles (2.4 km) to the northwest of Bellingham, on the River North Tyne.

== Governance ==
Charlton is in the parliamentary constituency of Hexham.

== Transport ==
Charlton was served by Charlton railway station on the Border Counties Railway which linked the Newcastle and Carlisle Railway, near Hexham, with the Border Union Railway at Riccarton Junction. The first section of the route was opened between Hexham and Chollerford in 1858, the remainder opening in 1862. The line was closed to passengers by British Railways in 1956. Part of the line is now beneath the surface of Kielder Water.
