= Wansbeck Railway =

Former railway in Northumberland, England

Overview
- Locale: Northumberland
- Continues as: North British Railway

History
- Opened: 1862
- Closed: 1966

Technical
- Track gauge: 4 ft 8 1/2 in (1,435 mm)

The Wansbeck Railway was a single-track railway line in Northumberland, England, that ran from Morpeth to Reedsmouth, where it made a junction with the Border Counties Railway. Conceived as part of a through trunk route for the North British Railway, it never achieved its potential. It opened in stages from 1862 to 1865. The population was sparse and mineral traffic kept the line going.

In 1870, the Rothbury Branch opened, from a junction on the Wansbeck Railway at Scotsgap.

The passenger train service was discontinued in 1952 and the line closed completely in 1966.

== History ==
=== The first railways ===
The Newcastle and Berwick Railway opened in 1847. Conceived by George Hudson, the so-called Railway King, it was to form part of a through railway connection from Edinburgh to London. It later became part of the York, Newcastle and Berwick Railway.

It had a station at Morpeth, and people in towns not connected to a railway realised they were at a disadvantage against those who were: materials brought in cost more, as did the transport of local manufactures to market.

The people of Rothbury felt that disadvantage particularly. The locality had long been prominent in the production of lime, used to improve acidic soil for agricultural purposes, and much in demand in the general area of Morpeth. In 1855, a railway linking Morpeth and Rothbury was proposed. It was to cost £95,000 but, although the idea was favourably received, the scheme failed to generate action and it was dropped.

=== The Wansbeck Valley Railway ===
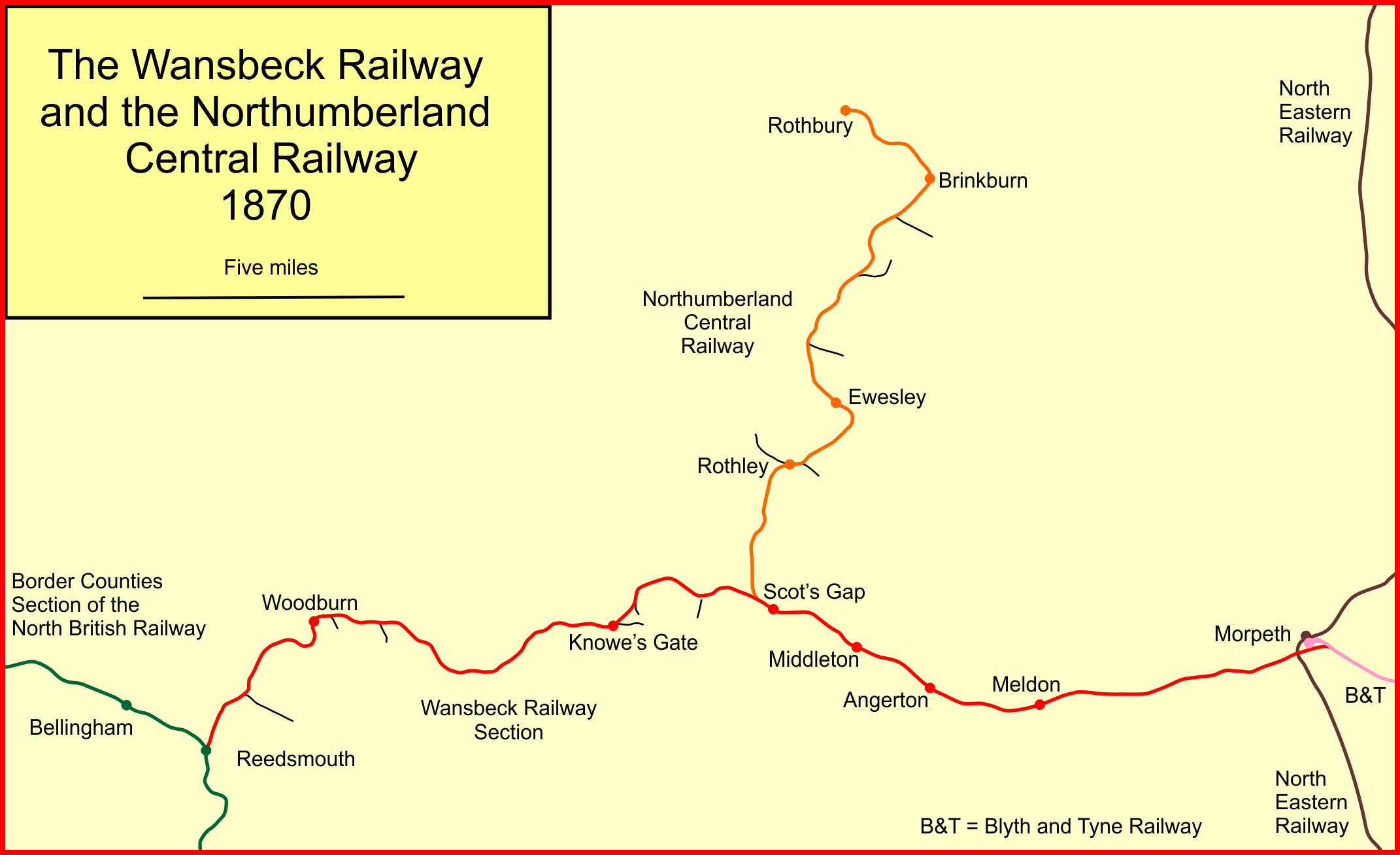
The Wansbeck Railway and the Rothbury Line

By 1858, the Border Counties Railway had opened the first section of its line, and having a local railway close by encouraged further thoughts of railway development in the area, but not to Rothbury. This line would run west from Morpeth to Reedsmouth on the Border Counties line, there getting access to the intended rich coalfields of Plashetts. At Morpeth, the new line would link with the Blyth and Tyne Railway, giving direct access to wharves on the North Sea, and over that line to Newcastle. The line would be 26 miles (42 km) long. Moreover, the Border Counties Railway had the clear intention of linking with the Border Union Railway. The BUR was sponsored by the North British Railway and, when it opened, its line became known as The Waverley Route. The Border Counties Railway was to link with that route at a place that became known as Riccarton.

Richard Hodgson, Chairman of the North British Railway, was a member of the provisional committee, which clearly shows the intention: the NBR was a link in a chain of railways between Edinburgh and London, via Berwick, but it was dominated by the railways of George Hudson, who had shown himself to be ruthless in his dealings, and who had already tried to take over the NBR. The NBR had no running rights south of Berwick. If the NBR could get access to Newcastle over friendly railways — the Border Union, the Border Counties, the Wansbeck Valley, and the Blyth and Tyne — it would have much greater autonomy, and access to the important commercial centre at Newcastle.

Wansbeck Railway Act 1859
- Act of Parliament
- Parliament of the United Kingdom
- Long title: An Act for the making and maintaining of the Wansbeck Railway from Morpeth to a Junction with the North Tyne Section of the Border Counties Railway, and with Branches to the Morpeth Branch of the Blyth and Tyne Railway and the Main Line of the North-eastern Railway respectively; and for other Purposes.
- Citation: 22 & 23 Vict. c. lxxxv

Dates
- Royal assent: 8 August 1859

The Wansbeck Valley committee changed the name to the Wansbeck Railway and submitted a bill for its 28-mile (45 km) line to the 1859 parliamentary session. It was relatively uncontroversial, and the Wansbeck Railway Act 1859 (22 & 23 Vict. c. lxxxv) obtained royal assent on 8 August 1859; the capital was set at £120,000. Working arrangement with the established railways were authorised by the act, and the NBR and the Blyth and Tyne were permitted to subscribe up to £100,000 between them to the Wansbeck Railway.

In fact the NBR subscribed £50,000; this was five-eighths of the Wansbeck's capital. (Note: From Ross, page 52; in fact he refers to the Shareholders' Meeting which authorised that subscription, but as he also described the NBR share issue to pay for it, it seems certain that it happened.)

=== Constructing the Wansbeck Railway ===
The Wansbeck Railway Act 1859 permitted two connecting lines at Morpeth: to the North Eastern Railway station, or by-passing it to join the Blyth and Tyne line south-east of the NER station. The controlling interest of the NBR and the lack of enthusiasm from the North Eastern Railway decided the Wansbeck Railway directors to make only the Blyth and Tyne connection. The Blyth and Tyne line ran eastwards from the NER station, so that the Wansbeck passenger and goods trains had to reverse to reach the Morpeth station.

The line was opened as far as Scotsgap on 23 July 1862; trains were worked by the North British Railway, although the stub of route was not physically connected to the NBR.

On 17 July 1862 the North British Company had obtained running powers to Newcastle over the line of the Newcastle and Carlisle Railway from Hexham, as part of a trade-off with the North Eastern Railway. This was a better route to Newcastle than over the Wansbeck line, and now the NBR lost interest in the Wansbeck Railway company. Running entirely through sparsely populated rural areas, and with the anticipated riches of the Plashetts coal field now being shown to be disappointing, the Wansbeck Railway was suddenly of doubtful commercial value. Selling out to the North British Railway seemed to be the only option.

North British Railway (Wansbeck Railway and Finance) Act 1863
- Act of Parliament
- Parliament of the United Kingdom
- Long title: An Act to authorize the North British Railway Company to raise more Money; and an Amalgamation with them of the Wansbeck Railway Company; and for other Purposes.
- Citation: 26 & 27 Vict. c. cxciv

Dates
- Royal assent: 21 July 1863

Text of statute as originally enacted

The North British Railway (Wansbeck Railway and Finance) Act 1863 (26 & 27 Vict. c. cxciv) of 21 July 1863 empowered the amalgamation. The NBR was already a majority shareholder, so there was no urgency in carrying out the merger, but it was accomplished sometime about March or April 1864. The connection with the Border Counties Railway at Reedsmouth had been planned to allow through running from Riccarton towards Morpeth, but that was now inappropriate, and the intended junction faced south instead. It is not clear whether an act of Parliament for this was obtained.

The line was opened as far as Knowesgate in October 1863. Reedsmouth station was opened for the Border Counties line in November 1864, but the Wansbeck line reached it on 1 May 1865: the Wansbeck Railway was now complete. The line had been built as single track, although land had been taken for double track.

There were three passenger trains each way on the line, with separate goods trains. The sparse population did not encourage a more intensive train service.

The line was worked by train staff and ticket; the block posts intermediately were Scotsgap and Woodburn. The system was converted to electric train token in 1890 - 1891.

=== Catcleugh reservoir ===
Catcleugh Reservoir was constructed in the 1890s, and traffic for construction materials was carried on the Wansbeck line. A siding for the purpose was installed at Broomhill, near Woodburn, and there was a narrow gauge tramway from there to the dam.

=== The Morpeth layout ===
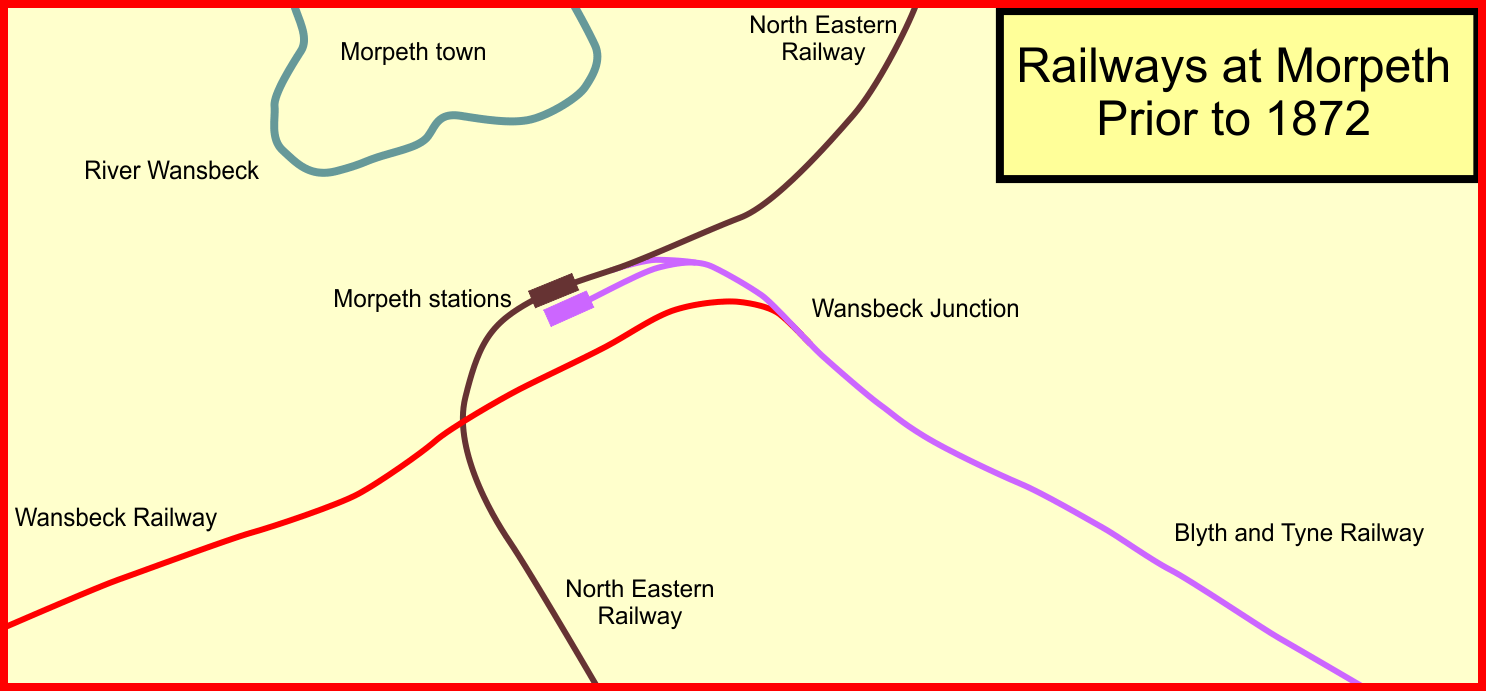
Morpeth Railways before 1872

The track arrangements at Morpeth are described above; Wansbeck trains using Morpeth station (passenger and goods) required to reverse at Wansbeck Junction. There was a collision there on 15 September 1871, and the Inspecting Officer's report indicates the arrangement. A passenger train was to depart the Wansbeck line and be followed by a goods train. The goods train departed first, propelling its train, and stood on the Blyth and Tyne single line beyond the junction; the passenger train then left Morpeth, also propelling, and ran to the junction, to reverse there and run to the Wansbeck line. It would then be followed by the goods train. (Note: The actual accident took place because the passenger train was not properly coupled, and as it slowed at the junction while being propelled, the leading vehicles ran forward, colliding with the waiting goods train. The brakes on the brake van may not have been properly adjusted.)

The Inspecting Officer stated that "a junction curve is about to be formed between the Wansbeck Valley and North-Eastern lines, which will enable the trains from the former to run direct into the Morpeth station of the latter line". This was done in 1872.

Hoole describes the Blyth and Tyne station at Morpeth as being separate from the North Eastern railway station, but they were immediately adjacent. When the new curve was built, the Wansbeck Railway and the North Eastern Railway each built part of it, installing the necessary signalling at their own end. "The NBR trains then deserted the B&T station for the North Eastern. The earlier line direct to the B&TR was removed at the same time.

=== The Rothbury branch ===
The first proposed railway from Morpeth to the area had been intended to reach Rothbury. Now that was revived, as the Northumberland Central Railway, oblivious apparently to the difficult finances of the Wansbeck Railway. In fact it proposed a 50 mile line northwards from Scotsgap; the capital was to be £270,000. The over-ambition of the scheme became obvious and it was cut back to a branch from Scotsgap to Rothbury. It opened on 1 November 1870. In fact Rothbury was a more important population centre than anywhere on the Reedsmouth line, and in the mid 1870s Rothbury came to be regarded as the main line, and Reedsmouth on the branch.

=== The twentieth century ===
The line was simply a rural branch line in a thinly populated area, although cattle and some minerals were buoyant. In the first decades of the twentieth century heavy military traffic arose because of camps in the area as well as artillery ranges.

Following World War I the main line railways of Great Britain were "grouped" under the Railways Act 1921, and in 1923 the North British Railway was a constituent of the new London and North Eastern Railway (LNER). The railways were nationalised by Government in 1948, and the Wansbeck line became part of the Scottish Region of British Railways. (Note: Although it was in England, the existing mid-level management structure was the successor to the North British Railway section of the LNER, and management disruption was avoided by this arrangement: Sewell, page 117.)

The already limited traffic had been further reduced by motor lorries and buses since the 1930s and closure to passengers became inevitable; it took place in September 1952. A very limited goods service continued, but the line was closed completely in October 1966.

== Topography ==
The line climbed from Morpeth on a ruling gradient at 1 in 62 to a summit between Knowesgate and Woodburn, then descending at the same ruling gradient.

Locations on the line after the spur direct to Morpeth station was opened were:

Station	Opened	Closed	Notes
Morpeth	1 March 1847	open	North Eastern Railway station
Meldon	23 July 1862	15 September 1952	
Angerton	23 July 1862	15 September 1952	
Middleton	23 July 1862	15 September 1952	renamed Middleton North in 1923
Scots Gap	23 July 1862	15 September 1952	also possibly Scotch Gap; soon renamed Scotsgap; sometime later renamed Scotsgap Junction
Knowes Gate	7 July 1864	15 September 1952	renamed Knowesgate in 1908
Woodburn	1 May 1865	15 September 1952	
Broomhope (Vickers Platform)	uncertain		private halt for workers at the Vickers armaments works
Parsons Platform	in use in 1937		private halt for the Parsons Estate; also known as Ray House Platform and Rayfell Halt
Reedsmouth	1 February 1861	11 November 1963	junction station on the Border Counties Railway
