= Rothbury railway station =

Railway station in Northumberland, England

Coordinates: 55.3087°N 1.9034°W

Rothbury
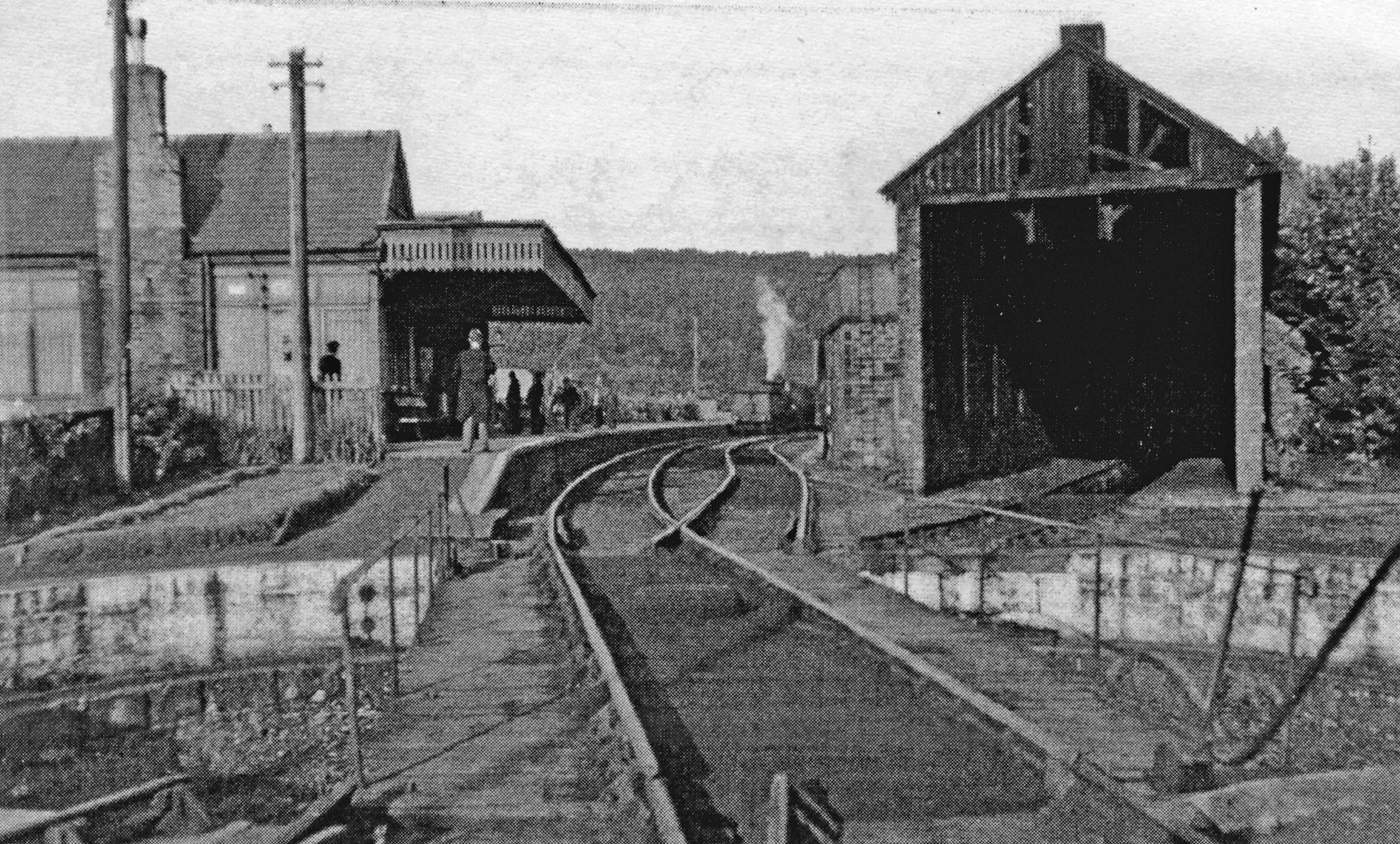
- Rothbury station, 1953

General information
- Location: Rothbury, Northumberland; England
- Grid reference: NU063017
- Platforms: 1

Other information
- Status: Disused

History
- Original company: Northumberland Central Railway
- Pre-grouping: North British Railway
- Post-grouping: London and North Eastern Railway; North Eastern Region of British Railways

Key dates
- 23 November 1870: Station opened
- 1899: Station rebuilt
- 15 September 1952: Station closed to passengers
- 11 November 1963: Station closed to freight
Location

Rothbury was a railway station in Northumberland, England at the end of the single-track Rothbury Branch that served the town of Rothbury. Rothbury was the terminus of the line with a turntable at the end of the track.

== History ==
In 1859, Parliament authorised the Wansbeck Railway Company to build the line from Morpeth to Reedsmouth. In 1862, the line from Morpeth to Scotsgap opened.

The next year, the Northumberland Central Railway were authorised to construct a line from Scotsgap to Ford on the Berwick to Kelso line. They also were permitted to build a short branch line to Cornhill. Due to financial difficulties, the line was to be built in stages beginning with the section from Scotsgap to Rothbury which was started in August 1869 and completed by November 1870. The North British Railway and the branch line became part of the London and North Eastern Railway in 1923. In September 1952, passenger services were withdrawn and the line closed in November 1963.

Originally built in wood, the station was rebuilt in stone in 1899. It has been demolished and the site is now an industrial estate.

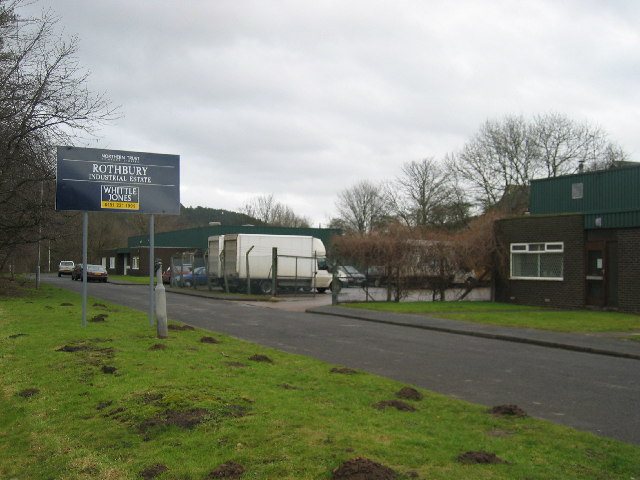
Station site in 2006, now an industrial estate.

Preceding station	Disused railways	Following station
Brinkburn; Line and station closed	North British Railway; Rothbury Branch	Terminus
