= Scotsgap railway station =

Railway station in Northumberland

Coordinates: 55.1718°N 1.9409°W

Scotsgap
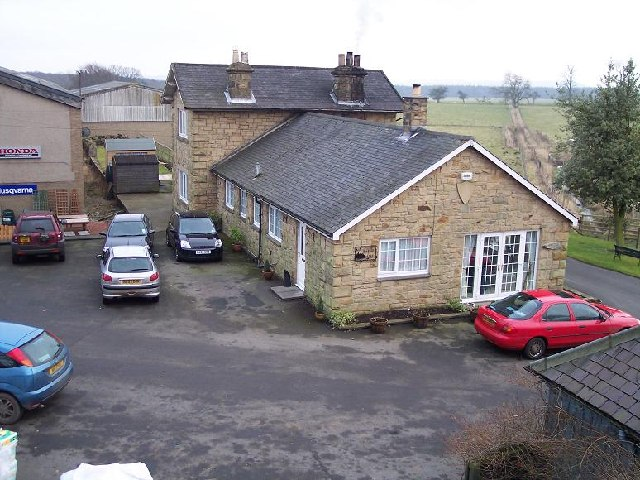

General information
- Location: Scots' Gap, Northumberland; England
- Grid reference: NZ039867
- Platforms: 1

Other information
- Status: Disused

History
- Original company: Wansbeck Railway
- Pre-grouping: Wansbeck Railway; North British Railway
- Post-grouping: London and North Eastern Railway; North Eastern Region of British Railways

Key dates
- 23 July 1862: Station opened as Scots Gap
- 15 September 1952: Station closed to passengers
- 3 October 1966: Station closed to freight
Location

Scotsgap was a stone-built railway station in Northumberland on the Wansbeck Railway, which served the villages of Scots' Gap and Cambo. It was located on the line between Morpeth and Reedsmouth, and was the junction for the branch line of the Northumberland Railway to Rothbury.

== History ==
In 1859 Parliament authorised the Wansbeck Railway Company to build the line from Morpeth to Reedsmouth. Due to financial difficulties the line was built in stages. In 1862 the line from Morpeth to Scotsgap opened, with an extension to Knowesgate opening a year later. At this time the Wansbeck Railway Company amalgamated with the North British Railway. It was only on 1 May 1865 that the line was completed. In 1923 the line and the North British Railway merged with the London and North Eastern Railway.

The station was opened as Scots Gap in 1862, but was renamed Scotsgap in October 1903. In September 1952 passenger services were withdrawn from the line, and the goods service from much of the line in November 1963. The line was closed completely in October 1966 with the station being closed on 3 October 1966. The station building and platform remain and the site is now occupied by an agricultural merchant.

Preceding station	Disused railways	Following station
Middleton North; Line and station closed	North British Railway; Wansbeck Railway	Knowesgate; Line and station closed
Terminus	North British Railway; Rothbury Branch	Longwitton; Line and station closed
