= Border Counties Railway =

Former railway line serving England and Scotland

Overview
- Status: Closed
- Locale: Roxburghshire, Scotland; Northumberland, England

Service
- Type: Heavy rail

History
- Work began: 11 December 1855
- Opened: 2 April 1858
- Completed: 24 June 1862
- Merged into: North British Railway - 1860
- Merged into: London North Eastern Railway - 1923
- Merged into: British Railways - 1948
- Closed: 1 September 1958; (except Reedsmouth–Bellingham, closed 11 November 1963)

Technical
- Track gauge: 4 ft 8 1/2 in (1,435 mm)

The Border Counties Railway was a railway line connecting Hexham in Northumberland, with Riccarton Junction on the Waverley Route in Roxburghshire.

Its promoter had hopes of exploiting mineral resources in the area, and it was taken up by the North British Railway, which hoped to develop it as a through main line between Edinburgh and Newcastle upon Tyne.

The railway opened in stages between 1858 and 1862, but the anticipated level of commercial traffic did not materialise, and the sparse population produced very little local passenger traffic. The line closed to passengers in 1956 and completely in 1963.

== History ==
=== Linking Central Scotland with England ===
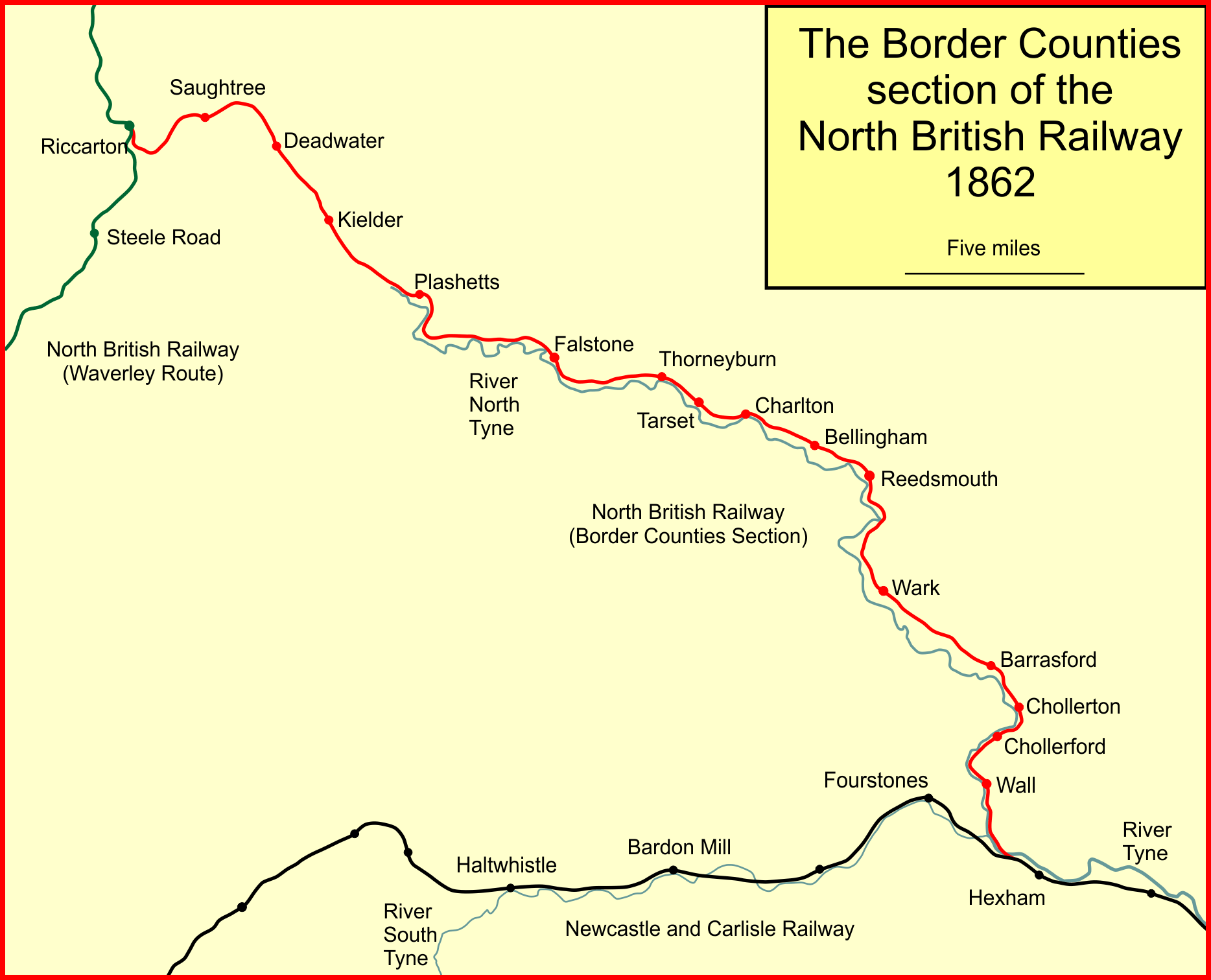
The Border Counties Railway system

When the Edinburgh and Glasgow Railway was under construction between 1838 and 1842, thoughts turned to the construction of longer distance railways in Scotland, and in particular to connecting central Scotland to the developing English network. For some time it was assumed that only one route was commercially viable, and vast controversy took place over what that should be, with a large number of candidate routes being put forward. The Southern Uplands and the Cheviot Hills presented a considerable topographical obstacle to many of the options, especially because at that date the power of steam locomotives, and their ability to climb steep and lengthy gradients was very limited.

Many of the proposals were motivated by sectional interests. The Newcastle and Carlisle Railway (N&CR) had opened the main part of its route in 1836, and a line running north from Hexham, following the River North Tyne, appeared to some to suggest a convenient approach from the south.

The Tyne, Edinburgh and Glasgow Railway proposed in 1836 by Stephen Reed of Newcastle would have left the N&CR at Hexham and run north through Carter Bar; altitude 1,370 ft (420 m). to reach Melrose and thence Edinburgh and Glasgow, but this was modified in 1838 as the proposed Hexham and Edinburgh Railway to run from Hexham via Kielder and Note o' the Gate (Note: On the present-day B6357 just north of Saughtree; the location is at about 1,250 ft (380 m) above sea level.) to Melrose. This scheme was encouraged by the N&CR (to which it would bring traffic) and the city of Newcastle upon Tyne, which would acquire commercial advantage from being on the main line.

As the debate about an Anglo-Scottish route continued over some years, the capabilities of steam locomotives improved, and the increasing availability of money moved the issue away from a single route determined by political considerations, to simple economics. In 1844 the North British Railway (NBR) was authorised to build a line from Edinburgh to Berwick to join an English line there. The NBR line ran close to the coast avoiding most high ground and opened in 1846. In 1845 the Caledonian Railway was authorised to construct a line from both Glasgow and Edinburgh to Carlisle, crossing the Southern Uplands at Beattock Summit, 1,033 ft (315 m) above sea level.

=== North from Hexham: first steps ===
Border Counties Railway (North Tyne Section) Act 1854
- Act of Parliament
- Parliament of the United Kingdom
- Long title: An Act for making a Railway from the Newcastle-upon-Tyne and Carlisle Railway, at or near Hexham in the County of Northumberland, to or near the Belling in the Parish of Falstone in the same County, to be called "The Border Counties Railway (North Tyne Section);" and for other Purposes.
- Citation: 17 & 18 Vict. c. ccxii

Dates
- Royal assent: 31 July 1854

Text of statute as originally enacted

The notion of the only Anglo-Scottish main line running through Hexham was now finished. If the area north of Hexham was not to be on a main line, then the sparse population and meagre mineral resources made it difficult to justify a railway line, and for some years none was proposed. In 1853 a scheme was put forward on the unproven assumption that a known four-feet coal seam was widespread in the region, based on Plashetts. A meeting at Bellingham in March 1854 attracted considerable support, and Robert Nicholson was engaged to survey a route. His line was to run from Hexham (on the N&CR) through Reedsmouth to Bellingham, and on to the coal deposits at Falstone. His work was remarkably quickly done, for a bill for the Border Counties Railway was submitted to Parliament for the 1854 session. The proposal was attacked on the grounds of the doubts about the mineral reserves, and also Nicholson's proposed laminated timber bridges, but in fact the scheme was authorised when the Border Counties Railway (North Tyne Section) Act 1854 (17 & 18 Vict. c. ccxii) was given royal assent on 31 July 1854. The capital was to be £250,000. (Note: Sewell, Thomas, Carter and Bell; Ross says 1 July 1854.)

Raising the capital proved to be difficult, and the first shareholders' meeting was not held until 20 March 1855. Robert Nicholson died in 1855 and the position of engineer to the company was assumed by his nephew J. F. Tone. Tone decided that the bridge over the River Tyne at Hexham (sometimes referred to as the Border Counties Bridge) should be in iron girders on stone piers instead of Nicholson's timber. In October 1855 contracts were let for part of the work to William Hutchinson.

At the ceremony of cutting the first sod on 11 December 1855, W. H. Charlton, the company's chairman, stated that Hutchinson would build the line for £180,000 and that the line would be extended to Scotland, making Hexham one of the great railway centres. Hutchinson immediately started work on the piling for the Hexham bridge but the first pile broke at 14 ft (4.3 m) and doubts about the strata caused Tone to redesign the bridge. Hutchinson had in fact tendered for the work without seeing a design, and he now had to stop work (on 10 January 1856). Scour was a serious issue at this location, and redesign was necessary on that account. Eventually, on 2 April 1858, the first section of line was opened, about 4 miles (6.4 km) in length, over the bridge and as far as Dunkirk Farm, a short distance north of Chollerford. The bridge had cost twice the originally estimated sum. Hutchinson had got into serious financial difficulty on completing the contract, largely because he had priced the work without seeing designs and without certainty of the ground conditions. The Border Counties Railway appears to have given him some considerable extra-contractual relief, putting their own financial position at risk.

The line was built as a single line, but land was acquired for later doubling, and all the bridges except the Hexham bridge, were built for double-track.

A public train service started on 5 April 1858; (Note: Sewell, Thomas, Bell; Ross says (page 46) 29 August 1858.) there were four passenger trains each way Monday to Saturday, and two on Sunday. They ran from Hexham to Chollerford, with an intermediate station at Wall.

=== Completing the first authorised line ===
The train service paid surprisingly well and encouraged a feeling of optimism among the Directors.

Notwithstanding Hutchinson's contractual difficulties, he accepted a contract for completing the authorised line from Dunkirk Farm to Falstone.

During the 1858 parliamentary session, the company presented a bill for a northward extension of the line into Scotland, and to authorise financial support from the North British Railway (NBR). This was opposed by the Caledonian Railway and the promoters of the Border Union Railway, which had not yet presented its own bill, and was supposedly friendly to the NBR. The bill failed in Parliament.

Border Counties Railway (Liddesdale Section and Deviations) Act 1859
- Act of Parliament
- Parliament of the United Kingdom
- Long title: An Act for authorizing the Border Counties Railway Company to make and maintain the Liddesdale Section of their Railway, and Deviations from the Line of the North Tyne Section of their Railway, and to raise further Capital; and for other Purposes.
- Citation: 22 & 23 Vict. c. xliii

Dates
- Royal assent: 1 August 1859

The climate had changed the following year, and the Border Union got its own act of Parliament, the Border Union (North British) Railways Act 1859 (22 & 23 Vict. c. xxiv). The Border Counties presented a fresh bill for an extension from Bellingham to a junction with the BUR, at Lees Bog. The location later became better known under the name Riccarton Junction. This time around the BUR was friendly, and although there was some opposition, the BCR got its act: the Border Counties Railway (Liddesdale Section and Deviations) Act 1859 (22 & 23 Vict. c. xliii) got royal assent on 1 August. The act of Parliament authorised an extension of time for construction of the earlier part of the line; the powers had in fact run out eleven days previously. The authorised capital was increased by £100,000. The North British Railway, by now overt sponsors of the BUR, were authorised to guarantee interest on BCR loans, and to make a working arrangement with the BCR. (Note: Ross (page 49) gives a Border Counties Railway Act of 5 August 1859 with similar powers, but this may be confusion with the associated Wansbeck Railway Act of 8 August 1859.)

From Wark, the line approached Reedsmouth, and there was a temporary goods terminus at Countess Park there while the river bridge was completed. The passenger service terminated at Wark. There was a demonstration train from Newcastle to Countess Park run on 1 December 1859. Public opening was expected "within the week" but this proved to be inaccurate, and the opening throughout to Falstone was delayed until 2 September 1861. (Note: Sewell's narrative is unclear here; the Countess Park facility was a "station" but passenger services did not reach it, so it must have been a goods station only. It was the terminus of the line while the River Reed bridge was being completed, but he says that the line did not open until it was complete to Falstone on 2 September 1861. Yet the Countess Park facility was closed when the line was extended to Bellingham. Quick lists the station as a passenger station.)

=== Amalgamation with the North British Railway ===
North British and Border Counties Railways Amalgamation Act 1860
- Act of Parliament
- Parliament of the United Kingdom
- Long title: An Act to authorise the Amalgamation of the Border Counties Railway Company with the North British Railway Company; and for other Purposes.
- Citation: 23 & 24 Vict. c. cxcv

Dates
- Royal assent: 13 August 1860

Text of statute as originally enacted

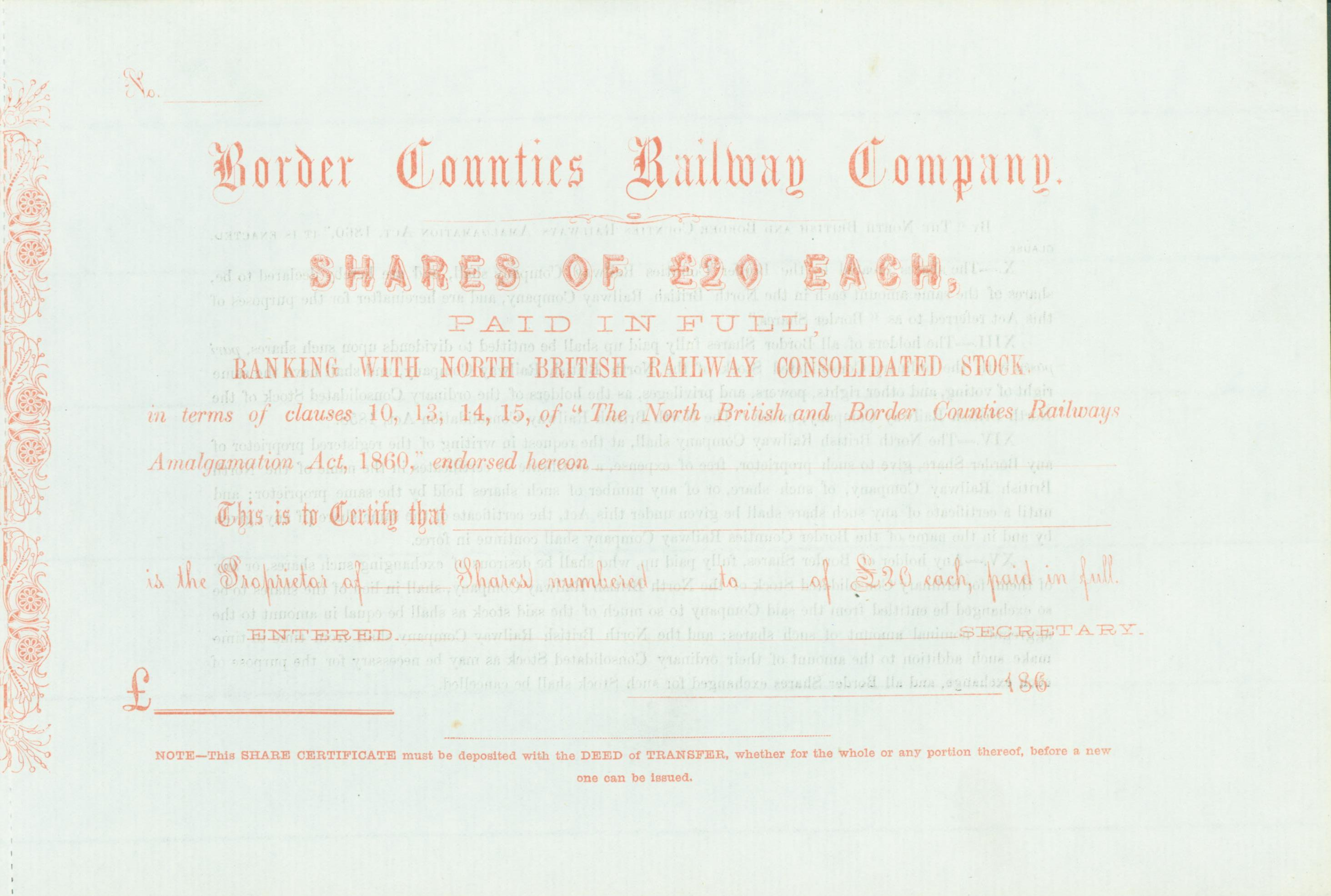
Unissued Share of the Border Counties Railway Company by 1860

By 1860 the company was seriously short of cash; the authorised capital had never been fully raised and the hoped-for coal reserves at Plashetts were disappointing. There seemed little chance of raising more capital now. The North British Railway was expansive, and was happy to take over the local line, and the result was the North British and Border Counties Railways Amalgamation Act 1860 (23 & 24 Vict. c. cxcv), passed on 13 August 1860; the capital for the BCR lines was increased to £350,000, and the act regularised the use by BCR trains of Hexham station of the Newcastle and Carlisle Railway. The BCR network was known now as the NBR (Border Counties Section).

=== Completion of the line ===
The construction of the line throughout to Riccarton was completed by mid-April 1862, and it was satisfactorily inspected by Captain Tyler of the Board of Trade. As that location was simply a remote junction with (at the time) no actual settlement, (Note: Riccarton was purely an interchange station; later there were 38 houses there, all occupied by railway workers and their families.) there was no point in opening the extension until the Border Union Railway opened its main line there. Accordingly, the opening throughout of the BCR was on 24 June 1862 (Note: Sewell, Thomas; Ross (page 55) gives 23 June.) for goods trains, and on 1 July 1862 for passengers.

The line was operated on the train-staff and ticket system.

Poor Hutchinson had been ill-used by the BCR and his contractual position had been taken advantage of. After completion of the line he was still placed at an unfair disadvantage and he was declared bankrupt on 5 December 1862.

=== Running powers ===
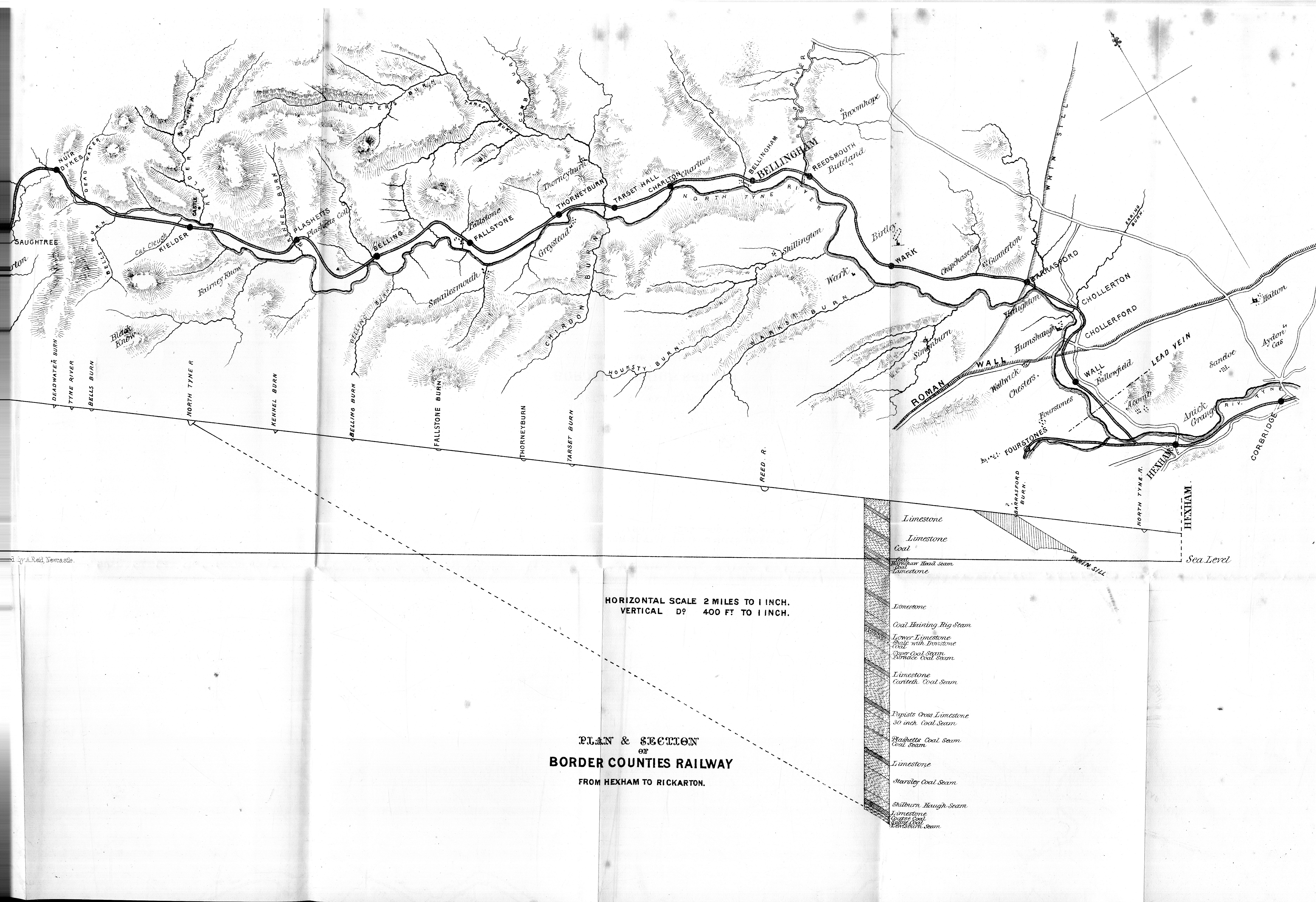
Border Counties Railway map Hexham to Saughtree 1863

The North Eastern Railway and the Newcastle and Carlisle Railway now proposed to amalgamate, under the name North Eastern Railway. The NBR and several other competing lines opposed the parliamentary bill. The NBR was persuaded to withdraw its opposition in return for an exchange of running powers: the NBR was to get running powers from Hexham to Newcastle, and from Sprouston to Kelso. The NER obtained running powers between Berwick and Edinburgh, including all facilities at and between those places, except for the running of local trains and fish trains.

The Wansbeck line, which connected Morpeth and Reedsmouth, had been planned as an NBR route to Newcastle, using the Blyth and Tyne Railway east of Morpeth. This was a very circuitous way to reach Newcastle, and the North British now believed it had a more direct route to the city, which it had long sought. The junction at Reedsmouth had been aligned to face northwards, to allow direct running from Hawick to Morpeth, but in the changed circumstances, it was modified to face south.

It is plain that the NER got a huge advantage from this arrangement, in fact running all east coast express trains throughout to Edinburgh. The NBR appear to have anticipated making the BCR route an alternative main line from Edinburgh via Hawick to Newcastle, but although through passenger trains did run, they were never of an "express" character. Three passenger trains made the journey each way daily in 1862; the journey time was nearly five hours. (Note: Some of the journeys may have involved a change of trains at Riccarton.) Much later some of the Newcastle and Hexham trains terminated at Hawick or Galashiels, but some through trips were maintained until 1922.

The NBR acquired land in Newcastle in 1862 for station accommodation at Tyneside Terrace and in March 1863 land for a goods station was purchased for £16,166. The NBR now calculated that the Border Counties line had cost £457,153 "after deduction of the £94,000 of its paid-up share capital".

=== The Wansbeck Railway ===
On 1 May 1865, the Wansbeck Railway was opened, between Morpeth and Reedsmouth. The Wansbeck Railway had been promoted independently but was taken over by the North British Railway in 1863. It joined the BCR route at Reedsmouth facing south.

=== Wark accident of 1889 ===
A northbound passenger train collided with a goods train at Wark station on 16 October 1889. The passenger train had only six people aboard, and five of them were injured. A southbound goods train had arrived at the passing station, and in contravention of the rules was allowed to occupy the loop connection to collect three wagons from the goods yard, even though the passenger train was expected. The passenger train arrived and struck the engine, having passed the distant signal at caution and not slackened speed enough; the driver was expecting to run directly into the station.

=== The twentieth century ===
Although there were occasional changes to the passenger timetable through the years, the general pace of the Border Counties line changed little. The considerable expansion of the Kielder Forest from 1946 brought some additional services for the workers there.

In 1923 the mainline railways of Great Britain were "grouped" under the Railways Act 1921 and the North British Railway was a constituent of the new London and North Eastern Railway (LNER). In turn, this was subject to the nationalisation of the railways in 1948.

In the period following World War II, both passenger and goods traffic had declined substantially, and closure of the line began to be considered. The Tyne Bridge at Hexham had deteriorated and was in poor condition. The line was scheduled for closure to passengers on 15 October 1956. (Note: The last train arrived at Hexham a little after midnight on Sunday morning 14 October.) The line remained open for the time being for goods trains, and some special inward passenger excursions ran during this period. However total closure was soon considered, and the line closed to all traffic on 1 September 1958, except that a Ramblers' special excursion probably traversed the line from Newcastle to Hawick on 7 September 1958.

The line from Morpeth to Reedsmouth remained open and the short section of the BCR route from Reedsmouth to Bellingham was retained, enabling a weekly goods service and passenger excursions to Bellingham to be run. That section too closed on 11 November 1963.

=== The present day ===
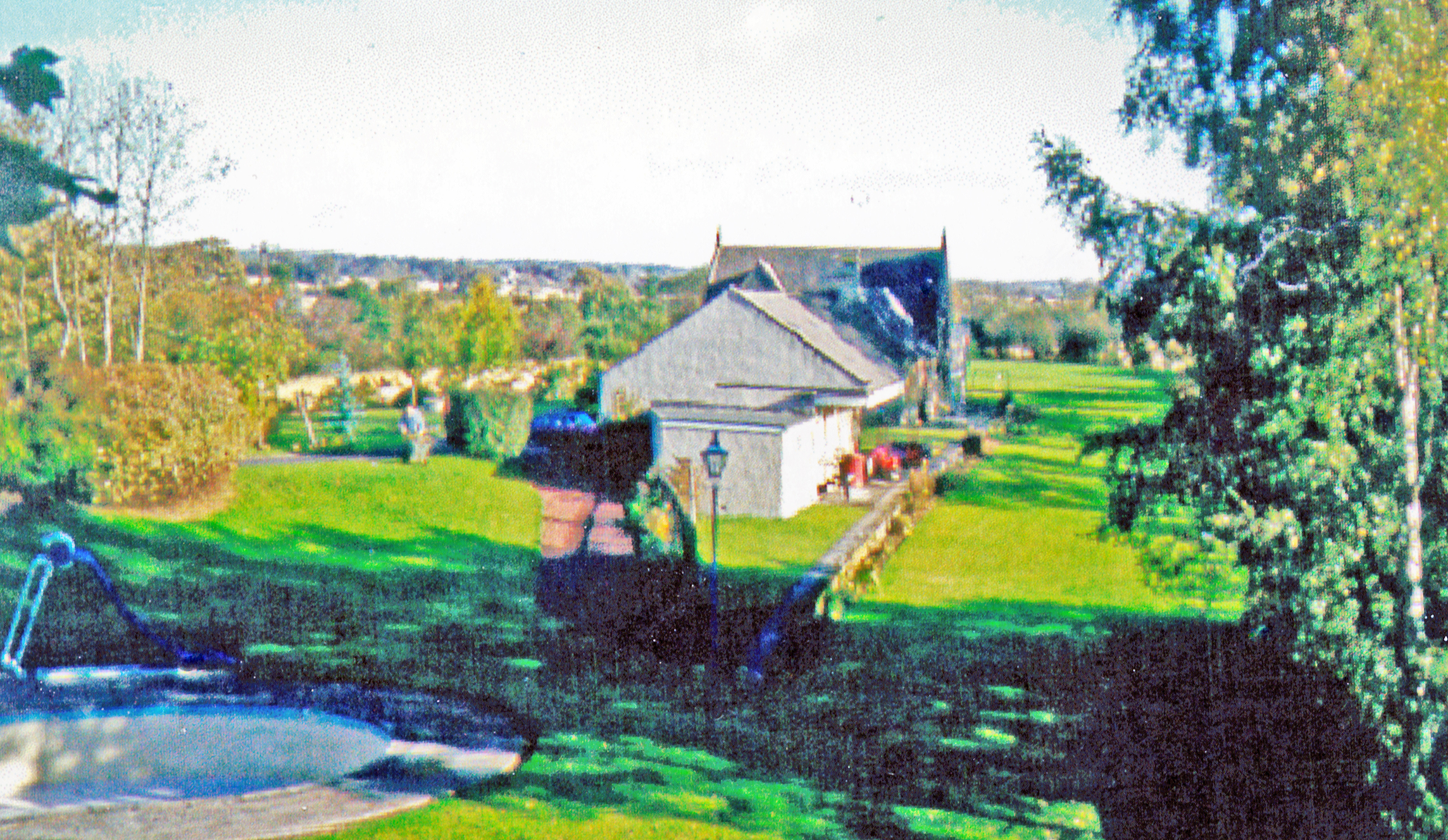
Converted remains of Humshaugh station, 1981

As the line ran through remote and undeveloped terrain, much of the course of it can be traced today. Many of the station houses have been converted to private residences.

The establishment of the reservoir called Kielder Water submerged part of the line in the early 1980s. None of the route is in railway use. However, in 2006, there were plans to re-open a small part of the line as a tourist attraction, to be called the Green Dragon Railway. The proposal was for a narrow gauge railway from a new water ferry landing stage at Gowanburn to Kielder Castle, a distance of about two miles. It would be a biofuel railway, using a wood-burning steam locomotive and a passenger coach heated by a wood-burning stove. The coach has been built and was on display at Leaplish Waterside Park on Kielder Water in November 2007. The project appears to have stalled and the locomotive, 0-4-2T Saccharine (Fowler 13355 of 1914), was moved to the Statfold Barn Railway in November 2008.

== Topography ==
The line left the Newcastle and Carlisle main line just west of Hexham:

- Border Counties Junction;
- Wall; opened 5 April 1858; closed 19 September 1955;
- Chollerford; opened 5 April 1858; renamed Humshaugh 1919; closed 15 October 1956;
- Chollerton; opened 1 December 1859; closed 15 October 1956;
- Barrasford; opened 1 December 1859; closed 15 October 1956;
- Barrasford Quarry; a mineral railway ran to quarries on the east side of the main line;
- Wark; opened 1 December 1859; closed 15 October 1956;
- Countess Park; opened 1 December 1859; closed 1 February 1861 (on extension of line);
- Reedsmouth; Wansbeck Railway converges; opened May 1861; closed 15 October 1956; contemporary maps indicate the spelling Redesmouth;
- Bellingham; opened 1 February 1861; renamed Bellingham North Tyne 1926; closed 15 October 1956;
- Charlton; opened 1 February 1861; closed 1 October 1862;
- Tarset; opened 1 February 1861; closed 15 October 1956;
- Thorneyburn; opened 1 February 1861; Tuesday only service from October 1864; full service from 27 September 1937; closed 15 October 1956;
- Falstone; opened 2 September 1861; closed 15 October 1956;
- Plashetts; there was a long mineral railway and wagonway running to mines east of the main line;
- Kielder; opened 1 January 1862; renamed Kielder Forest 1948; closed 15 October 1956;
- Deadwater Foot Crossing; opened privately by March 1877; made public and renamed Deadwater 1 March 1880; closed 15 October 1956;
- Saughtree; opened 1 July 1862; closed 1 December 1944; re-opened 23 August 1948; closed 15 October 1956;
- Riccarton Junction on Waverley Route.

The line climbed more or less continuously from Hexham to Riccarton; the ruling gradient was 1 in 100. The most consistent climb was from Hexham to Wark, and again from Plashetts to Riccarton; the summit of the line was at 870 ft (270 m), close to Riccarton.
