= Morpeth railway station =

Railway station in Northumberland, England

Morpeth
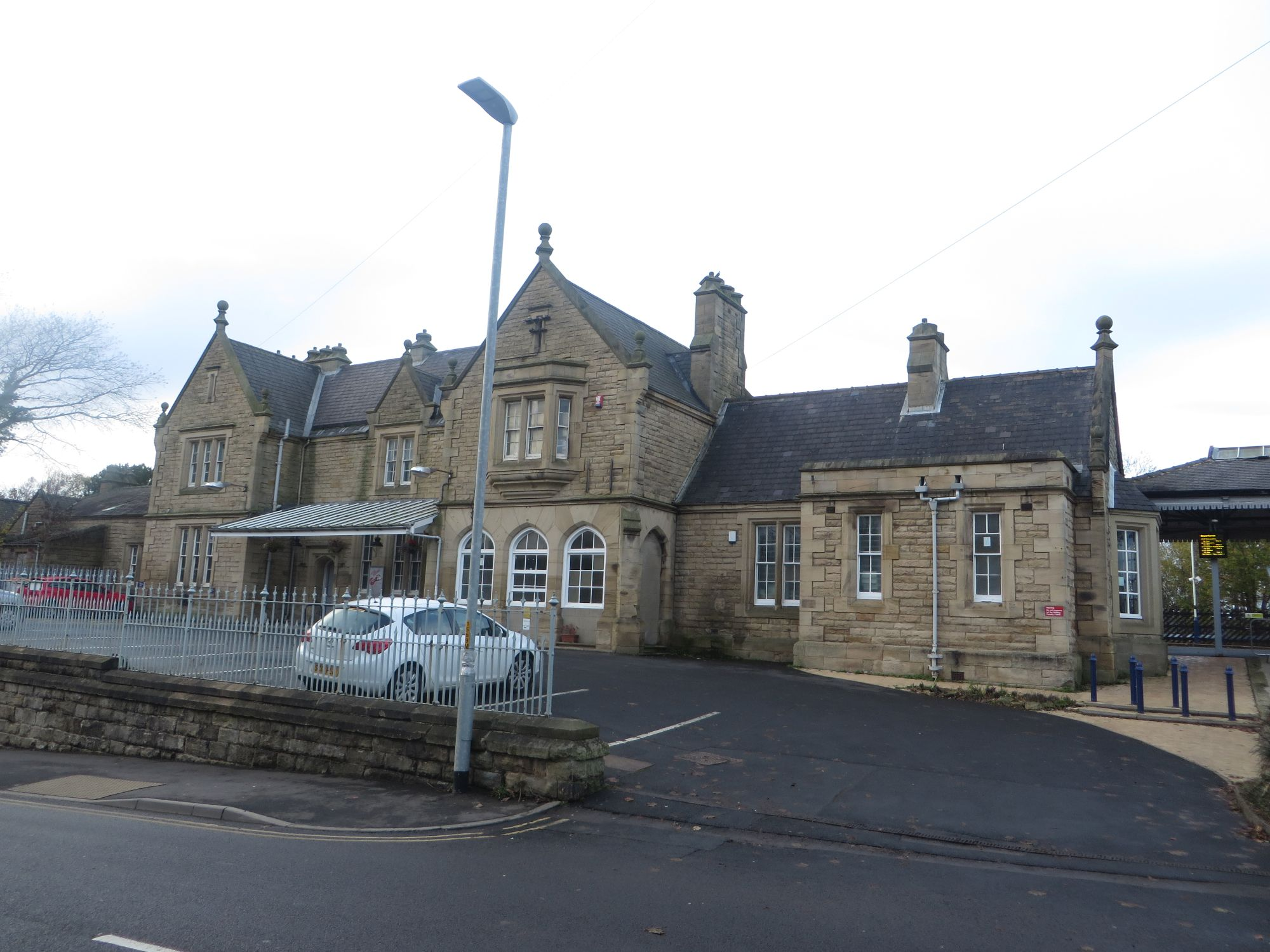

General information
- Location: Morpeth, Northumberland; England
- Coordinates: 55°09′45″N 1°40′59″W
- Grid reference: NZ202853
- Owner: Network Rail
- Manager: Northern Trains
- Platforms: 2

Other information
- Station code: MPT
- Classification: DfT category E

History
- Original company: York, Newcastle and Berwick Railway
- Pre-grouping: North Eastern Railway
- Post-grouping: London and North Eastern Railway; British Rail (North Eastern Region)

Key dates
- 1 March 1847: Opened

Passengers
- 2020/21: ▼82,468
- Interchange: ▼304
- 2021/22: ▲0.403 million
- Interchange: ▲1,961
- 2022/23: ▲0.488 million
- Interchange: ▼1,648
- 2023/24: ▲0.519 million
- Interchange: ▼1,202
- 2024/25: ▲0.623 million
- Interchange: ▲1,620
Location
- Location within Northumberland
Notes
- Passenger statistics from the Office of Rail and Road

Morpeth is a railway station on the East Coast Main Line, which runs between London King's Cross and Edinburgh Waverley. The station, situated 16 miles 50 chains (16.6 mi; 26.8 km) north of Newcastle, serves the historic market town of Morpeth, Northumberland, England. It is owned by Network Rail and managed by Northern Trains.

== History ==
The station was opened by the Newcastle and Berwick Railway on 1 March 1847. It was designed by Benjamin Green in the Scottish Baronial style and retains its original station buildings.

A severe ninety degree curve in the line of the railway immediately to the south of the station has been the site of four serious rail accidents, two of them fatal.

=== Blyth and Tyne Railway ===
Another station was opened by the Blyth and Tyne Railway on 1 April 1858 and closed 24 May 1880. This was a terminus station that was also used by North British Railway trains from the west from Scotsgap from the opening of their line in 1862 until 1872. The B&T line to Bedlington lost its passenger trains in April 1950 (although occasional summer services between Scotland and the North Eastern coastal resorts continued operating over it until the 1960s), but it remains in use for freight and may have its passenger trains restored in the future (as an extension of the current local stopping service) - the South East Northumberland Rail User Group is currently campaigning for this. The current local service from Newcastle that terminates here uses the connection onto the B&T line north of the station to reverse and layover clear of the main line between trips.

Passenger trains over the old NBR line from Scotsgap, Reedsmouth and Rothbury ended in September 1952 and it closed completely in 1966 - few traces of this route now remain.

== Facilities ==
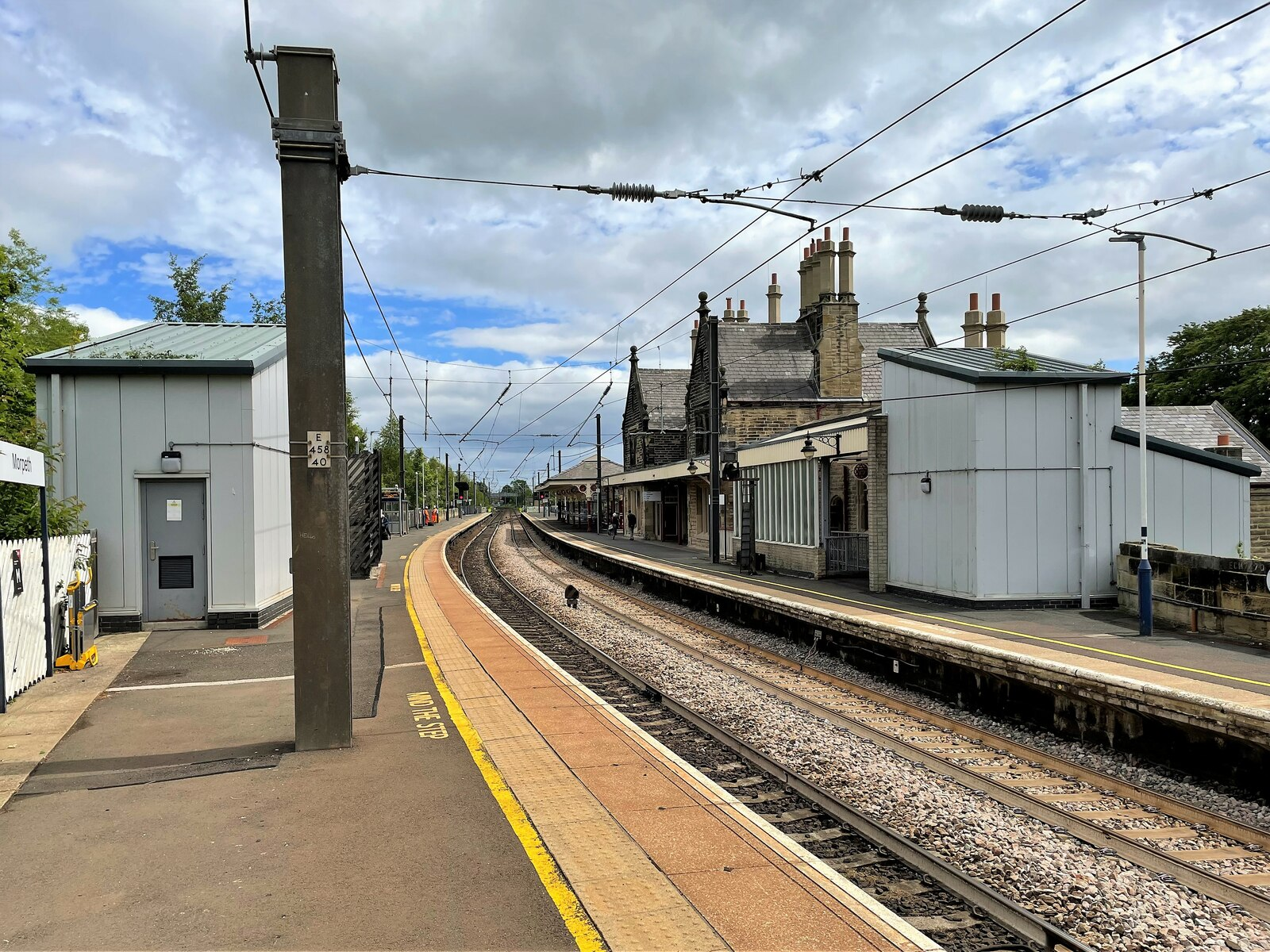
Station platforms in 2022

In December 2011, a self-service FastTicket machine was installed by Northern Rail for use outside the hours of operation of the ticket office (06:40 -12:40, Mondays to Saturdays only). Pre-purchased tickets can now also be collected from Morpeth. The ticket office is located on the eastern side of the line in the main station building, which also has a taxi office and toilets. The opposite (northbound) platform has a waiting shelter and the two are linked by a subway with lifts for wheelchair and mobility impaired users. Train running information is supplied via timetable posters and digital display screens.

A £2.4 million redevelopment of the station was approved in October 2016 and was started in October 2018 - this has seen the main buildings refurbished and the portico entrance modernised to incorporate a cafeteria, expanded ticket office and upgraded toilets. 5,382 square feet (500 m^{2}) of office space has been created for local small businesses. The exterior of the station has been restored to Benjamin Green's original design, including the reinstatement of 15 tall chimney pots. The project was led by Greater Morpeth Development Trust and Northumberland County Council, with financial support from the Railway Heritage Trust, Network Rail, Northern and the National Lottery Heritage Fund. The refurbishment was completed in September 2020 and opened by Andy Savage, executive director of the Railway Heritage Trust.

== Services ==
=== CrossCountry ===
As of the May 2021 timetable change, there are four trains per day heading north towards Edinburgh Waverley. Heading south, there are five trains per day (weekday) to Birmingham New Street via Sheffield, one of which continues to Plymouth, with a further three trains running as far as Bristol Temple Meads. On a Saturday, a single train operates to Bristol Temple Meads. On Sunday, four trains run to Birmingham New Street, with one continuing to Plymouth, and two running as far as Bristol Temple Meads.

Rolling stock used: Class 220 Voyager and Class 221 Voyager

=== London North Eastern Railway ===
As of the June 2021 timetable change, there are seven trains per day heading north towards Edinburgh Waverley, one of which extends to Aberdeen. There are seven trains per day heading south, five of which run to London King's Cross, with two trains per day running as far as Newcastle and Leeds respectively.

Rolling stock used: Class 800 Azuma and Class 801 Azuma

=== Lumo ===
In October 2021, Lumo commenced the operation of a twice-daily service between London King's Cross and Edinburgh Waverley. This was later increased to the current frequency of five trains per day in early 2022.

Rolling stock used: Class 803 AT300

=== Northern Trains ===
As of the December 2025 timetable change, there is an hourly service to Newcastle. There is also an early morning and an evening train extending to Chathill.

Rolling stock used: Class 156 Super Sprinter and Class 158 Express Sprinter

=== TransPennine Express ===
As of the May 2021 timetable change, there is a twice-daily service between Liverpool Lime Street and Edinburgh Waverley via Newcastle. Prior to the COVID-19 pandemic, the service operated north of Newcastle at an hourly frequency.

In September 2021, TransPennine Express announced that they would be introducing a five return trains per weekday semi-fast service between Newcastle and Edinburgh from December 2021, which will call at Morpeth.

Rolling stock used: Class 802 Nova 1

Preceding station	National Rail	Following station
Newcastle	Lumo; London–Edinburgh	Edinburgh Waverley
Newcastle	CrossCountry; South West–Birmingham–North East–Scotland	Alnmouth
Newcastle	London North Eastern Railway; London–Edinburgh	Alnmouth
Cramlington towards Newcastle	Northern Trains; East Coast Main Line	Pegswood (Peak only) towards Chathill
Cramlington towards Newcastle	Northern Trains; East Coast Main Line	Terminus
Newcastle	TransPennine Express; North TransPennine	Alnmouth
Cramlington	TransPennine Express; North TransPennine	Edinburgh Waverley
	Historical railways	
Meldon	North British Railway; Wansbeck Railway	Terminus
Hepscott	North Eastern Railway; Blyth and Tyne Railway	Terminus
Stannington	North Eastern Railway; York, Newcastle and Berwick Railway	Pegswood

== Bibliography ==
- Body, G. (1989). PSL Field Guides - Railways of the Eastern Region Volume 2: Northern operating area (1st ed.). Wellingborough: Patrick Stephens Ltd. ISBN 1-8526-0072-1. OCLC 59892452.
- Butt, R. V. J. (October 1995). The Directory of Railway Stations: details every public and private passenger station, halt, platform and stopping place, past and present (1st ed.). Sparkford: Patrick Stephens Ltd. ISBN 978-1-85260-508-7. OCLC 60251199. OL 11956311M.
- Jowett, Alan (March 1989). Jowett's Railway Atlas of Great Britain and Ireland: From Pre-Grouping to the Present Day (1st ed.). Sparkford: Patrick Stephens Ltd. ISBN 978-1-85260-086-0. OCLC 22311137.
- Jowett, Alan (2000). Jowett's Nationalised Railway Atlas (1st ed.). Penryn, Cornwall: Atlantic Transport Publishers. ISBN 978-0-906899-99-1. OCLC 228266687.
