= Reedsmouth railway station =

Disused railway station in Northumberland, England

Reedsmouth
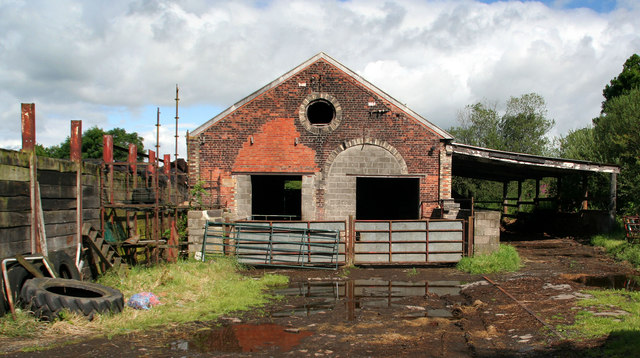
- Former Reedsmouth engine shed in 2009.

General information
- Location: Redesmouth, Northumberland; England
- Coordinates: 55.134°N 2.215°W
- Grid reference: NY863822
- Platforms: 3

Other information
- Status: Disused

History
- Original company: Border Counties Railway
- Pre-grouping: North British Railway
- Post-grouping: London and North Eastern Railway; North Eastern Region of British Railways

Key dates
- 1 February 1861: Station opens
- 15 October 1956: Closed to passengers
- 11 November 1963: Goods services withdrawn
Location

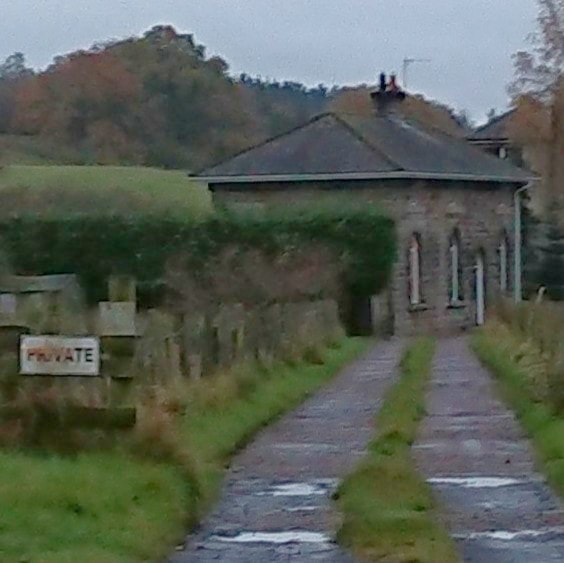
Railway building at Reedsmouth Station, Redesmouth, Northumberland

Border Counties Railway

Overview
- Status: Closed
- Locale: Roxburghshire, Scotland; Northumberland, England

Service
- Type: Heavy rail

History
- Commenced: 11 December 1855
- Opened: 2 April 1858
- Completed: 24 June 1862
- Merged into: North British Railway - 1860
- Merged into: London North Eastern Railway - 1923
- Merged into: British Railways - 1948
- Closed: 1 September 1958; (except Reedsmouth–Bellingham, closed 11 November 1963)

Technical
- Track gauge: 4 ft 8 1/2 in (1,435 mm)

Reedsmouth is a closed railway station in Northumberland, England. It was a junction station where the Wansbeck Railway (Morpeth to Reedsmouth) joined the Border Counties Railway (Hexham to Riccarton Junction). It served the village of Redesmouth, which is spelled differently.

The station was opened in November 1864. It was closed to passengers in October 1956, but remained open for goods trains and public excursions until November 11, 1963. Today, the station can be visited on foot by going into the hamlet of Redesmouth, through the kissing gate and following the footpath signs towards Countess Park. Furthermore, there are old photos and relics to be found at Bellingham Heritage Centre and at the Carriages Tea Room which, as the name suggests, is situated in a restored railway carriage in the Heritage Centre car park.

== Services ==
Preceding station	Disused railways	Following station
Bellingham	London and North Eastern Railway; Border Counties Railway	Wark
Terminus	North British Railway; Wansbeck Railway	Woodburn

== See also ==
- List of closed railway stations in Britain
