= High Sheriff of Northumberland =

English ceremonial officer

This is a list of the high sheriffs of the English county of Northumberland. The high sheriff is the oldest secular office under the Crown. Formerly the High Sheriff was the principal law enforcement officer in the county but over the centuries most of the responsibilities associated with the post have been transferred elsewhere or are now defunct, so that its functions are now largely ceremonial. The High Sheriff changes every March.

== 11th century ==
- 1076–1080 Gilebert
- 1085–1095 Arkell Morel, supposed slayer of Malcolm Canmore, King of Scots at the Battle of Alnwick.

== 12th century ==
- 1107–1118 Joint Ligulf and Aluric
- 1119–1132 Odard
- 1133–1150 Adam son of Odard
- 1154 Odard
- 1155–1170 William de Vesci, Lord of Alnwick
- 1171–1184 Roger de Stuteville
- 1185–1188 Roger de Glanville
- 1189 William de Stuteville
- 1190 William de Stuteville and Reginald Basset
- 1191–1193 William de Stuteville
- 1194–1199 Hugh Bardulf

== 13th century ==
- 1200 William Stuteville and John Laleman
- 1201–1203 Robert fitzRoger and Radulph de Furnell
- 1204
- 1205
- 1206 Robert fitz Roger and Robert of Kent
- 1207 Robert fitz Roger and And. de Corvo
- 1208 Robert fitz Roger and Thomas Haltem
- 1209–1213 Robert fitz Roger and William de Blunvill
- 1212-1220 Philip of Oldcoates (with others)
- 1214 Almericus, Archdeacon of Durham and Philip of Oldcoates
- 1215 Philip of Oldcoates and William de Stratton
- 1216–1219 Philip of Oldcoates of Matfen
- 1220–1221 Robert de Wirceser
- 1222 William Brewer and Roger Langford
- 1223 William Brewer jnr and Thomas de Tetleburn
- 1224–1226 John, son of Robert Clavering and William Coniers
- 1227 John, son of Robert Clavering
- 1228–1230 Brian son of Alan and Hugh de Magdeby
- 1231–1234 Brian son of Alan and John de Mersley
- 1235 Richard
- 1236–1242 Hugh de Bolebet and Alan de Kirkby
- 1243–1245 Hugh de Bolebet and Robert de Camboe
- 1246–1256 Sir William Heron.
- 1257–1258 John de Plesset
- 1259–1260 Thomas son of Michael
- 1261 Adam de Gesenor and Hugh of Hereford
- 1262–1266 Adam de Cresenor and John de Lichegreynes
- 1267–1268 Wischardus de Charny
- 1269–1271 Richard de Charny
- 1272–1274 Robert de Hampton
- 1275–1277 John de Lichegreynes
- 1278–1279 Walter de Cannblion
- 1280–1287 Thomas de Dyneleston
- 1288–1292 Richard Knoul
- 1293–1295 Hugh Gobium
- 1296 John de Kirkby
- August 1296 – August 1299 Robert de Balliol
- 1299–1300 Roger Mynot
- 1235: Richard de Gray
- 1211 William Brewer
- 1212–1214 William Brewer

== 14th century ==
- 1301: John de Camboe
- 1302–1303: Lucas Talboys
- 1304–1307: John de Creppinge and John de Sheffield
- 1307: Robert de Fawdon
- 1308: Sir Guischard de Charron
- 1309–1310: John de Kenton
- 1311–1313: William de Felton of Matfen and John de Kenton
- 1314: Sir William de Ridell
- 1327: John de Lisle and John de Fenwick
- 1327–1328: John de Lilburn
- 1233:
- 1334: Roger Mauduit
- 1335–1337: Robert Darreins
- 1338–1341:
- 1342–1343: Sir William Felton of Matfen
- 1344–1345: Robert Bertram and Robert de Fenwicke
- 1346–1347: Robert Reyms
- 1348–1349: John Clifford
- 1350:
- 1351–1353: John de Coupland
- 1354:
- 1355–1356:Henry de Percy, 3rd Baron Percy
- 1357–1358: Alan de Strother
- 1359–1360: Henry de Strother
- 1361: John Heron
- 1362: Roger de Widrington
- 1363: Richard de Horseley
- 1364–1368: Henry de Strother
- 1369–1371: Richard de Horseley
- 1372: Robert Umfravill
- 1373: Sir Thomas Surtees of Low Dinsdale Manor
- 1374: John Fenwicke
- 1375: Bertram Montboucher
- 1376: Thomas de Ilderton
- 1377: Robert Umfravil
- 1377: Bertram Montboucher
- 25 November 1378: Sir Thomas Surtees, of Low Dinsdale Manor
- 14 July 1379: Alexander Surtees, of Low Dinsdale
- 5 November 1379: Sir Bertram Montboucher
- 6 December 1381: Adomar de Atholl
- 3 November 1382: Robert de Clifford
- 1 December 1383: John Heron
- 11 November 1384: Henry Percy, 1st Earl of Northumberland
- 3 January 1387: Sir Bertram Montboucher
- 20 August 1388: Bertram Montboucher
- 1 December 1388: Sir Thomas Umfraville
- 15 November 1389: Sir Ralph Euer (1st term)
- 7 November 1390: Sir John Felton
- 28 November 1391: Henry Percy, 1st Earl of Northumberland
- 3 November 1397: Sir Ralph Euer (2nd term)
- 10 November 1399: Sir John Fenwick
- 30 September 1399: Henry Percy

== 15th century ==
- 1400: Ger. Heron and Robert Umfravill
- 1401: John Milford (Mitford?)
- 1402: John Clavering
- 1403:
- 1404: Robert Umfravill
- 1405: Sir Thomas Rokeby
- 1405: Robert Lisle
- 1406: Robert Herbotell
- 1407: Thomas Grey
- 1408: Robert Tempest
- 1409: John Widrington
- 1410: John Bertram
- 1413: John Maveres
- 1414: Edward Hastings
- 1415: Robert Lisle
- 1416: John Bertram
- 1417: Sir Robert Ogle of Ogle
- 1418: Edward Hastings
- 1419: William Elmeden
- 1420–1421: Sir Thomas Surtees of Low Dinsdale Manor
- 1422: John Bertram
- 1423: John Middleton of Belsay Castle
- 1424: John Bertram
- 1425: John Widrington
- 1426: William Lambton
- 1427: Henry Fenwick
- 1428: William Carnaby
- 1429: John Woderington
- 1430: John Bertram
- 1431: Roger Woderington
- 1432: John Midleton
- 1433: Sir Matthew Whitfield of Whitfield Hall
- 1434: John Bertram
- 1435: Roger Woderington
- 1436: Sir William Eure of Kirkley
- 1437: Robert Ogle
- 1438: John Bertram
- 1439: Robert Herbotell
- 1440–1441: John Heron of Gawby
- 1442: Roger Woderington
- 1443: John Heron
- 1444: Robert Claxton
- 1445: William Haringe
- 1446: Thomas Wellden
- 1447: Bertram Herbotell
- 1448: Thomas Nevill
- 1449: Ro. de Woderington
- 1450: Roger Thornton
- 1451: John Heronford
- 1452: Robert Mitford
- 1453: John Burcester
- 1454: Robert Manners, MP
- 1455: Radulph Grey of Chillingham
- 1456: John Heron
- 1457: Roger Thornton
- 1458: William Bertram
- 1459: Radulph Grey
- 1461: John Middleton
- 1462–1463: George Lumley
- 1464: Robert Maures
- 1465: Ger Woderington
- 1466: William Bowes
- 1467: John Neville
- 1468–1471: George Lumley
- 1472–1474: John Woderington
- 1475–1481: Henry Percy, 4th Earl of Northumberland
- 1482: Henry Percy, 4th Earl of Northumberland
- 1483: Radulph Herbotle
- 1484: Henry Percy, 4th Earl of Northumberland
- 1485: Robert Maneret
- 1485–1487: Henry Percy, 4th Earl of Northumberland
- 1493: Roger Fenwick
- 1495: Richard Cholmondeley
- 1496: Robert Grey
- 1497: George Taylboys

== 16th century ==
- 1501: Edward Radcliff
- 1503: Ralph Eure of Kirkley
- 1505: Thomas Ilderton
- 1507: Nicholas Ridley
- 1509–1511: Nicholas Ridley
- 1515: Radulph Fenwick
- 1515-1516: Nicholas Errington
- 1518: Christopher Thirkill
- 1519: George Skelton
- 1520: Christopher Dacre
- 1521: William Elleker
- 1524: William Elleker
- 1525: William Heron
- 1526: William Eure
- 1527: Cuthbert Ratcliffe
- 1532–1537: Henry Percy, 6th Earl of Northumberland
- 1540: John Woderington
- 1541: Leon. Cornaby
- 1542: John de Lavale
- 1543: Thomas Hilton
- 1544: Sir John Collingwood of Eslington Hall
- 1545: John Horsley
- 1547: John de Lavale
- 1548: Thomas Hilton
- 1549: Sir John Foster of Bamburgh Castle
- 1550: John Gray
- 1551: Sir Robert Collingwood of Eslington Hall (son of Sir John, HS 1544)
- 1552: Sir John Witheryngton
- 1553: Sir John de la Vale
- 1554: George Heron
- 1555: Sir Robert Ellerker
- 1556: Ralph Grey
- 1557: Sir George Ratcliffe / Sir Thomas Grey
- 1559: John Witherington
- 1560: Albany Featherstonehaugh of Featherstone Castle
- 1561: Robert Lawson
- 1562: Henry Percy
- 1563: Radulph Grey
- 1564: Sir Thomas Forster of Adderstone
- 1565: John de Lavele
- 1566: George Heron
- 1567: Cuthbert Carnaby
- 1568: Cut. Collingwood
- 1569: Robert Raydes
- 1570: Nicholas Ridley
- 1571: John de Lavele and George Heron
- 1572: Sir Thomas Forster of Adderstone
- 1573: Cuthbert Carnaby
- 1574: Thomas Grey
- 1575: Robert de Lavele
- 1576: Robert Middleton
- 1577: Francis Russell
- 1578: Sir William Fenwick
- 1579: Sir Henry Widdrington
- 1580: Cut. Colingwood
- 1581: John Heron
- 1582: Raduph Grey
- 1583: Robert de Lavele
- 1584: James Ogle
- 1585: Richard Radley
- 1586: Robert Clauding
- 1587–1588: Henry Anderson
- 1589: Sir William Fenwick
- 1590: Alexander Featherstonehaugh of Featherstone Castle
- 1591: Radulph Grey
- 1592: Robert de Lavele
- 1593: Radulph Grey
- 1594–1595: Thomas Bradford
- 1596: George Muschamp of Barmoor Castle
- 1597–1598: Edward Grey
- 1599: Thomas Middleton
- 1565: Luke Ogle of Eglingham Hall

== 17th century ==
- 1600: George Muschamp of Barmoor Castle
- 1601: Edward Talbot, 8th Earl of Shrewsbury
- 1602: Sir Nicholas Forster of Bamburgh Castle
- 1603: Sir William Selby of Twizell Castle
- 1604: Ralph Delaval of Seaton Delaval
- 1606 Feb: Henry Widdrington
- 1606:Sir William Selby of Twizell Castle
- 1607: Sir George Selby of Newcastle
- 1608: Ralph Delavalof Seaton Delaval
- 1609: Edward Talbot, 8th Earl of Shrewsbury
- 1610: John Delaval of South Dissington
- 1611: Sir Ralph Grey
- 1612: Sir Claudius Forster of Blanchland Abbey
- 1613: Sir Ralph Selby Knt
- 1614: Sir John Clavering Knt of Callaly Castle
- 1615: Sir Henry Anderson of Haswell, Co. Durham
- 1616: Sir William Selby of Twizell Castle
- 1617: Robert Brandling of Felling
- 1618: Thomas Middleton of Belsay Castle
- 1619: Sir John Fenwick of Fenwick and Wallington
- 1620: Sir Matthew Forster Kt of Adderstone.
- 1621: Sir Ralph Delaval Kt of Seaton Delaval
- 1622: Sir William Muschamp Kt of Barmoor Castle
- 1623: Sir John Clavering of Callaly Castle
- 1624: Sir John Delaval of South Dissington
- 1625: Cuthbert Heron of Chipchase Castle
- 1626: Sir Francis Brandling of Alnwick Abbey
- 1627–28: Sir Thomas Swinburne of Edlingham Hall
- 1629: Thomas Carr of Ford Castle
- 1630–31: Sir Robert Brandling of Felling
- 1632: Sir Nicholas Tempest of Thornley
- 1633: Thomas Middleton of Belsay Castle
- 1634: Sir John Delaval of South Dissington
- 1635: Sir William Carnaby of Langley
- 1636: Sir William Widdrington of Widdrington Castle, later Baron Widdrington
- 1637: Thomas Forster of Adderstone Hall
- 1638: Thomas Middleton of Belsay Castle
- 1638: Robert Bewicke of Close House, Northumberland
- 1639: William Orde of East Orde
- 1640: Robert Mitford of Mitford Castle(died in office)
- 1641: William Selby of Biddlestone Hall
- 1642: Gilbert Swinhoe
- 1643: Michael Weldon
- 1644: Sir Henry Ogle of Eglingham Hall
- 1644: Sir John Fenwick of Fenwick and Wallington
- 1645: Robert Clavering of Brinkburn
- 1646: William Shafto of Bavington Hall
- 1647: Edward Collingwood of Dissington Hall
- 1648: Robert Lisle of Felton
- 1649: Ralph Delaval of Seaton Delaval
- 1650: Robert Mitford of Mitford Castle
- 1651: Richard Forster of Newham Hall, Ellingham
- 1652: Robert Middleton of Belsay Castle
- 1653: Robert Shafto of Benwell Tower
- 1654: John Ogle of Eglingham Hall
- 1655: Luke Killingworth
- 1656–57: Edward Fenwick of Stanton Old Hall
- 1658: William Fenwick
- 1659: Edward Fenwick of Stanton Old Hall
- 1660: Sir William Blackett, 1st Baronet of Matfen.
- 1660: Ralph Jennison of Elswick Hall
- 1661: Mark Milbank of North Shields
- 1662: Thomas Bewicke of Close House
- 1663: Thomas Horsley of Long Horsley
- 1664: Sir Francis Bowes of Thornton Hall, High Coniscliffe, Co Durham
- 12 November 1665: William Middleton, of Belsay Castle
- 7 November 1666: Sir William Forster, of Blanchland Abbey
- 6 November 1667: Sir Cuthbert Heron, 1st Baronet, of Chipchase Castle
- 6 November 1668: Robert Shafto, of Benwell Tower
- 25 November 1668: Sir Cuthbert Heron, 1st Baronet, of Chipchase Castle
- 11 November 1669: John Heron, of Bockenfield
- 4 November 1670: William Selby, of Beal
- 9 November 1671: Francis Addison, of Ovingham
- 11 November 1672: John Forster, of Cornhill
- 12 November 1673: Martin Fenwick
- 5 November 1674: Sir Thomas Loraine, 1st Baronet, of Kirkharle Hall
- 12 November 1674: William Widdrington
- 15 November 1675: John Shafto, of Bavington Hall
- 10 November 1676: Utrecht Whitfield, of Whitfield Hall
- 15 November 1677: Francis Forster, of Easington Grange, Co Durham
- 14 November 1678: Sir Mark Millbanke, 1st Baronet, of Halnaby, York.
- 13 November 1679: Edward Blackett
- 4 November 1680: Henry Ogle, of Eglingham Hall
- 1681–82: Edmund Craster of Craster Tower
- 1683–84: James Howard of Redesdale Hall
- 1685: Sir Mark Millbanke, 2nd Baronet
- 1686–87: Richard Neile of Plessy and Shotton
- 1688: Sir William Blackett, 1st Baronet, of Newcastle-upon-Tyne of Wallington Hall.
- 1689: Sir John Heron Bt of Chipchase Castle.
- 1690: John Carr of Kenton.
- 1691: John Blackett of Wylam.
- 1692: George Bacon of Staward
- 1693: John Rogers of Denton
- 1694: Robert Bewicke of Close House
- 1695: Robert Shafto of Benwell Tower
- 1696: Robert Mitford of Mitford Castle
- 1697: Edward Collingwood of Dissington Hall
- 1698: Robert Heselrigg of Swarland Old Hall
- 1699: Ralph Scurfield of Eachwick

== 18th century ==
- 1700: William Wilkinson of Crossgate, Durham
- 1701: John Grey of Howick Hall
- 1702: Gawen Aynsley of Harnham and Little Harle Tower
- 1702: William Browne of Bolton
- 1703: Thomas Forster of Adderstone Hall
- 1703: Sir James Clavering, 2nd Baronet of Axwell House
- 1704: John Clennell of Clennell Hall
- 1705: Gabriel Hall of Otterburn
- 1706: Henry Ogle of Eglingham Hall
- 1707: Robert Lawson of Chirton Hall
- 1708: William Carr of Eshott Hall
- 1709: John Horsley of Milburn Grange, Ponteland
- 1710: George Fletcher of Thropton Spital
- 1711: Sir John Middleton Bt of Belsay Castle
- 1712: William Orde of Fenham and Newminster Abbey
- 1712: Henry Rawlings of Newcastle
- 1713: William Fenwick of Bywell Hall
- 1713: Mark Strother of Fowberry Tower
- 1714: John Johnson of Bebside
- 1715: John Rogers of East Denton
- 1716: Ralph Jenison of Elswick Hall
- 1717: Robert Shafto of Benwell Tower
- 1718: William Coatsworth of Gateshead Park
- 1720: Matthew White of Blagdon Hall
- 1721: Edward Delaval of Dissington Hall
- 1721: Isaac Allgood of Brandon
- 1722: William Charlton of Hesleyside Hall.
- 1723: Robert Mitford of Mitford Castle
- 1724: John Coatsworth of The Hermitage, St John Lee.
- 1725: Alexander Collingwood of Little Ryle.
- 1726: Robert Bewicke of Close House.
- 1727: Luke Clennell of Clennell Hall.
- 1727: John Fenwick of Bywell Hall
- 1728: Matthew Whitfield of Whitfield Hall
- 1729: Francis Blake Delaval of Ford Castle and Seaton Delaval Hall
- 1730: Thomas Watson of Grindon Ridge
- 1731: Walter Blackett formerly Calverley of Wallington Hall.
- 1732: John Reed of Bellingham and later Chipchase Castle
- 1733: John Ogle of Eglingham Hall
- 1734: Henry Ellison of Parkhouse and Hebburn Hall
- 1735-36: Henry Grey (later Sir Henry Grey Bt) of Howick Hall
- 1737: Henry Ogle of Causey Park House
- 1738: James Hargrave of Shawdon Hall
- 1738: William Errington of Walwick Grange (died in office, Mar 1739)
- 1739: John Blackett of Wylam
- 1740: George Shafto Delaval of Bavington Hall
- 1741: John Strother Kerr of Fowberry Tower
- 1742: Anthony Isaacson of Fenton
- 1743: Charles Loraine of Stanton
- 1744: James Carr of Black Heddon
- 1745: William Bacon of Staward Hall
- 1746: John Watson of Newham Hall, Ellingham
- 1746: Lancelot Allgood of Nunwick Hall
- 1747: William Ord of Fenham
- 1748: Nicholas Browne of Bolton
- 1749: Gawen Aynsley of Little Harle Tower, Kirkwhelpington
- 1750: William Carr of Etal Castle
- 1751: William Bigge of Benton House, Little Benton, Newcastle on Tyne
- 1752: William Fenwick of Bywell Hall
- 1753: Robert Fenwick of Lemmington Hall
- 1754: Robert Shafto of Benwell Hall
- 1755: John Swinburne of Wesgate
- 1756: Matthew White (later Sir Matthew White Bt) of Blagdon Hall
- 1757: Sir Edward Blackett, 4th Baronet of Matfen Hall
- 1758: William Wilkinson of Clennell Hall
- 1759: Abraham Dixon of Belford Hall
- 1760: Sir Robert Bewicke of Close House
- 1761: Alexander Collingwood of Unthank Hall
- 1762: Ralph Bates of Milbourne Hall
- 1763: John William Bacon of Staward Hall
- 1764: Christopher Reed of Chipchase Castle
- 1765: Matthew Forster of Bolton
- 1766: Henry Collingwood of Cornhill
- 1767: Hilton Lawson, of Chirton
- 1768: Bryan Burrell of Broome Park
- 1769: Michael Pearson of East Matfen
- 1770: John Simpson of Horsley on the Hill
- 1771: Thomas Charles Bigge of Benton House, Little Benton, Newcastle on Tyne.
- 1772: Francis Blake of Crawley
- 1773: William Lowes of Ridley Hall
- 1774: Sir William Loraine Bt of Kirkharle Hall
- 1775: Walter Trevelyan of Netherwitton Hall
- 1776: John Askew of Pallinsburn House
- 1777: William Ord of Fenham of Whitfield Hall (son of William, HS 1747)
- 1778: Thomas Carr of Eshott Hall
- 1779: Daniel Craster of Craster Tower
- 1780: Andrew Robinson Bowes of Benwell Hall
- 1781: Charles Brandling of Gosforth House
- 1782: Calverley Bewicke of Close House
- 1783: William Hargrave of Shawdon Hall
- 1784: Sir Francis Blake Bt of Fowberry Tower
- 1785: Sir Henry George Liddell Bt of Eslington Park
- 1786: James Allgood of Nunwick Hall
- 1787: Edward Collingwood of Chirton Hall
- 1788; Davidson Richard Grieve of Swarland Hall
- 1789: Robert Lisle of Acton House
- 1790: John Lowes of Ridley Hall
- 1791: John Wood of Beadnell
- 1792: Ralph William Grey of Backworth
- 1793: Henry Collingwood of Lilburn Tower
- 1794: Charles John Clavering of Axwell House
- 1795: Cuthbert Shafto of Bavington Hall
- 1796: Adam Mansfeldt Lawson de Cardonnell of Chirton
- 1797: Matthew Bell of Woolsington
- 1798: Adam Askew of Ellington
- 1799: Sir John Edward Swinburne Bt of Capheaton Hall

== 19th century ==
- 5 February 1800: George Adam Askew, of Pallinsburn House
- 11 February 1801: Sir Charles Miles Lambert Monck, 6th Baronet, of Belsay Castle
- 3 February 1802: Charles William Bigge of Benton House, Little Benton
- 3 February 1803: Shaftoe Craster, of Craster Tower
- 1 February 1804: Sir Thomas Henry Liddell, 6th Baronet, of Eslington Park
- 6 February 1805: John Hunter, of The Hermitage, Hexham
- 1 February 1806: William Linskill of Tynemouth Lodge
- 4 February 1807: Sir William Blackett, 5th Baronet, of Matfen
- 3 February 1808: Cuthbert Ellison of Broomhouse
- 6 February 1809: William Sadlier Bruere, of Bewick
- 31 January 1810: John Reed, of Chipchase Castle
- 8 February 1811: William Burrell, of Broome Park
- 24 January 1812: Ralph Bates, of Milbourne Hall
- 10 February 1813: John Carr, of Hedgeley Hall
- 4 February 1814: Sir Charles Loraine, 5th Baronet, of Kirkharle Hall
- 13 February 1815: George Baker, of Stanton
- 1816: Matthew Bell of Woolsington
- 1817: Sir Thomas John Clavering, 8th Baronet of Axwell House
- 1818: Robert Lancelot Allgood of Nunwick Hall
- 1819: William Orde of Nunnykirk Hall.
- 1820: Lt. Col. William Clark of Belford Hall
- 1821: Addison John Cresswell-Baker of Cresswell Hall
- 1822: Edmund Craster of Preston
- 1823: Prideaux John Selby of Twizell House.
- 1824: Edward Collingwood of Dissington Hall
- 1825: Anthony Gregson of Bowsden and Lowlin.
- 1826: William Pawson of Shawdon Hall
- 1827: Dixon Dixon of Benton House and Unthank Hall
- 1828: Charles Bosanquet of Rock Hall
- 1829: Sanderson Ilderton of Ilderton Hall
- 1830: Sir John Trevellyan Bt of Wallington Hall
- 1831: George Silvertop of Minsteracres
- 1832: Henry John William Collingwood of Lilburn Tower
- 1833: Sir Edward Blackett, 6th Bt of Matfen Hall
- 1834: William Roddam of Roddam Hall
- 1835: Bertram Osbaldeston Mitford of Mitford Hall
- 1836: Thomas Riddell of Felton Park
- 1837: William John Charlton of Hesleyside Hall
- 1838: Isaac Cookson of Meldon Park
- 1839: John Davidson of Ridley Hall
- 1840: William Lawson of Longhirst
- 1841: Sir Matthew Ridley Bt of Blagdon Hall
- 1842: Edward Riddell of Cheeseburn Grange
- 1843: Thomas Anderson of Little Harle Tower, Kirkwhelpington
- 1844: Edward John Collingwood of Lilburn Tower
- 1845: Ralph Carr of Hedgeley Hall
- 1846: Charles William Orde of Nunnykirk Hall
- 1847: James Henry Holles Atkinson of Angerton
- 1848: George Burdon of Heddon House
- 1849: John Hodgson-Hinde of Stelling Hall
- 1850: Sir Walter Calverley Trevelyan, 6th Baronet, of Wallington Hall
- 1851: Sir Horace St Paul Bt, of Ewart Park near Berwick on Tweed.
- 1852: Thomas Wood Craster, of Craster Tower
- 1853: Walter Selby, of Biddlestone Hall
- 1854: Samuel Edward Widdrington, of Newton Hall
- 1855: Rowland Errington, of Sandhoe House
- 1856: Bryan Burrell, of Broome Park
- 1857: William Henry Charlton, of Hesleyside Hall
- 1858: Lancelot John Hunter Allgood, of Nunwick Hall
- 1859: Henry Charles Silvertop, of Minsteracres
- 1860: William Cuthbert, of Beaufront Castle
- 1861: William John Pawson, of Shawdon Hall
- 1862: John Cookson, of Meldon Park
- 1863: Watson Askew, of Pallinsburn House
- 1864: Henry Metcalfe Ames, of Linden Hall
- 1865: John Errington, of High Warden
- 1866: Sir John Swinburne, 7th Baronet of Capheaton Hall
- 1867: George Culley of Fowberry Tower
- 1868: John Blenkinsopp Coulson of Blenkinsop Castle
- 1869: Matthew Tewart Culley of Coupland Castle
- 1870: Henry Gregson of Lowlin
- 1871: John George Frederick Hope-Wallace of Featherstone Castle
- 1872: Roddam John Roddam of Roddam Hall
- 1873: Sir William Armstrong of Cragside
- 1874: Shalcross Fitzherbert Widdrington of Newton Hall
- 1875: John Towlerton Leather of Middleton Hall
- 1876: Calverley Bewicke of Close House, Wylam
- 1877: Richard Hodgson-Huntley of Carham Hall
- 1878: John Philip Osbaldeston Mitford of Mitford Hall
- 1879: John Craster of Craster Tower
- 1880: Cadogan Hodgson Cadogan of Brinkburn Priory
- 1881: John Gifford Riddell of Swinburne Castle
- 1882: Oswin Cumming Baker-Cresswell of Cresswell Hall
- 1883: George Dixon Atkinson-Clark of Belford Hall
- 1884: Sir Arthur Edward Middleton Bt of Belsay Castle
- 1885: Walter Charles Selby of Biddlestone Hall
- 1886: George Anderson of Little Harle Tower, Kirkwhelpington.
- 1887: Ralph Atkinson of Angerton, Morpeth
- 1888: John Ralph Carr-Ellison of Hedgeley Hall
- 1889: Sir Edward William Blackett, 7th Baronet of Matfen Hall
- 1890: Cadwallader John Bates of Langley Castle
- 1891: George Pringle Hughes of Middleton, Wooler
- 1892: Richard Burdon-Sanderson of Warren House, Belford
- 1893: Edward Leadbitter of The Spital, Hexham
- 1894: Maj Gen Sir William Crossman of Cheswick, Beal
- 1895: Nathaniel George Clayton of The Chesters, Humshaugh
- 1896: Sir Andrew Noble of Jesmond Dene House
- 1897: Sir John Buchanan-Riddell, 11th Baronet of Whitefield House, Hepple
- 1898: Augustus Edward Burdon of Hartford House, Cramlington
- 1899: William Watson-Armstrong of Cragside

== 20th century ==
- 1900: Lawrence William Adamson of Eglingham Hall, Eglingham, Alnwick
- 1901: Hugh Andrews of Swarland Hall
- 1902: Thomas Clennel Fenwick-Clennel of Harbottle Castle
- 1903: Wiliam Donaldson Cruddas of Haughton Castle
- 1904: Thomas Taylor of Chipchase Castle
- 1905: John Davidson Milburn of Guyzance
- 1906: Alexander Browne of Callaly Castle
- 1907: John Coppin Straker of The Leazes, Hexham
- 1908: James Edward Woods of Swarland Hall
- 1909: Newton Charles Ogle of Kirkley Hall
- 1910: Charles Algernon Parsons of Holeyn Hall
- 1911: Capt. James Harold Cuthbert of Beaufront Castle
- 1912: David Hugh Watson Askew of Castle Hills, Berwick on Tweed
- 1913; Howard Pease of Otterburn Tower
- 1914: Sir Hugh Douglas Blackett of Matfen Hall
- 1915: George Hope Waddilove of Brunton House
- 1916: Ralph George Elphinstone Mortimer of Milbourne Hall
- 1917: Walter John Benson of Newbrough Hall
- 1918: Sir George John William Noble of Jesmond Dene House
- 1919: Edward Gordon Collingwood of Dissington Hall
- 1920: Sir Hubert Swinburne of Capheaton Hall
- 1921: Clarence Dalrymple Smith of Loughbrow House, near Hexham
- 1922: Philip Ernest Noble of Jesmond Dene House
- 1923: Sir Alexander Leith, 1st Baronet of Greycourt, near Riding Mill
- 1924: Col. Philip Blencowe-Cookson of Meldon Park
- 1925: Brig Gen. Bertram Fitzherbert Widdrington of Newton Hall, near Alnwick
- 1926: Arthur Scholefield of Lint Close. Alnmouth
- 1927: John Edward Cowen of Minsteracres
- 1928: Sir Leonard John Milburn of Bank House, Guynance.
- 1929: William Noel Villiers of Adderstone Hall
- 1930: Capt. Herbert Benjamin Speke of Pigdon
- 1931: Philip Eustace Smith of Rothley Crag
- 1932: William Henry Charlton of Hesleyside Hall
- 1933: Hugh Edward Joicey later 3rd Baron Joicey of Etal Manor
- 1934: Clennel Frank Massey Drew-Wilkinson of Clennell Hall
- 1935: Major George Denis Anderson of Little Harle Tower, Kirkwhelpington
- 1936: Capt Archibald William Milburn of Fowberry Tower
- 1937: Edward Foyle Collingwood of Lilburn Tower
- 1938: Thomas Dalrymple Straker-Smith of Howden Dene
- 1939: Lt Col. Henry Stanley Bell of Bavington Hall
- 1940: Norman Dakeyne Newall of Newbrough Lodge
- 1941: Frank Buddle Atkinson of Gallowhill
- 1942: Col. Bernard Cruddas of Middleton Hall, Morpeth
- 1943: Sir Arthur Munro Sutherland Bt. of Hethpool House, Kirknewton
- 1944: John Montagu Craster of Craster Tower
- 1945: Lt Col. Thomas George Taylor of Chipchase Castle
- 1946: Lt Col. Richard Straker of Angerton Hall, Morpeth
- 1947: John George Grey Rea of Berrington House, Ancroft
- 1948: Charles Ion Carr Bosanquet of Rock Moor House, Alnwick
- 1949: Capt Alexander Milne Keith of The Chesters, Humshaugh, Hexham
- 1950: Arthur Hilton Ridley of Park End, Simonburn.
- 1951: William Archer Benson of Newbrough Hall.
- 1952: Lt Col Henry Haswell Peile of Ogle Castle.
- 1953: Major Charles Douglas Blackett of Halton Castle later Sir Charles Blackett, 9th Baronet.
- 1954: Guy Hunter Allgood of Nunwick Hall, Simonsburn.
- 1955: Sir Charles Reginald Francis Morrison-Bell, Bt, of High Green, Tarset
- 1956: Sir Humphrey Brunel Noble, 4th Baronet, of Walwick Hall, Humshaugh, Hexham.
- 1957: Major Frederick John Charlton, of Hesleyside, Bellingham.
- 1958: Major Alexander Simon Cadogan Browne, of Callaly Castle, Alnwick
- 1959: Lieut.-Colonel Neil Harming Reed Speke, of Aydon White House, Corbridge
- 1960: Lieut.-Colonel William Edward Hedley-Dent, of Shortflatt Tower, Belsay, Newcastle-upon-Tyne.
- 1961: John Christopher Blackett-Ord of Oakerlands House, Hexham.
- 1962: Captain Addison Joe Baker-Cresswell
- 1963: John Joicey Straker, of Stagshaw House, Corbridge
- 1964: Major David Julian Warde-Aldam, of Healey Hall, Riding Mill.
- 1965: Major John Edward Joicey, of Blenkinsopp Hall, Haltwhistle
- 1966: Francis Nathaniel Heron Widdrington, of Newton Hall, Newton-on-the-Moor, Morpeth.
- 1967: William Joseph Straker-Smith, of Carham Estate House, Cornhill-on-Tweed
- 1968: Colonel Samuel Enderby, of The Riding, Hexham
- 1969: Lieut.-Colonel Henry Rice Nicholl, of Lipwood Hall, Haydon Bridge, Hexham
- 1970: David John Orde, of Nunnykirk, Netherwitton, Morpeth
- 1971: Peregrine John Wishart Fairfax of Mindrum
- 1972: Sir Ralph Carr-Ellison of Hedgeley Hall, Powburn, Alnwick
- 1973: Maj John Elliott Benson of Chesters, Humshaugh, Hexham
- 1974: Maj Ronald Peter Hedley-Dent of Shortflatt Tower, Belsay, Newcastle upon Tyne
- 1975: Peter Orlando Ronald Bridgeman of Fallodon Hall, Embleton, Alnwick
- 1976: Major Michael John Blencowe Cookson, of Meldon Park, Hartburn, Morpeth
- 1977: Michael Ian Bowstead Straker, of High Warden, Hexham
- 1978: John Browne-Swinburne, of Capheaton Hall, Newcastle upon Tyne
- 1979: Timothy Richard Petre Stephens Norton, of The Manor House, Whalton, Morpeth
- 1980: Kenneth Alan Clark, of Loughbrow House, Hexham
- 1981: Lieut Commander Charles David Matthew Ridley, of Park End, Simonburn, Hexham
- 1982: John Cecil Raleigh Trevelyan, of Netherwitton Hall, Morpeth
- 1983: Reginald Gordon Fenwick Armstrong, of Embleton Hall, Longframlington, Morpeth.
- 1984: Lancelot Guy Allgood, of Nunwick, Simonburn, Hexham.
- 1985: Thomas Walker Sale, of Ilderton, Glebe, Ilderton, Alnwick
- 1986: Wyndhann Julian Rogers-Coltman, of Berryburn, Ancroft, Berwick-upon-Tweed.
- 1987: Anthony Robert Pearson of Angerton Hall, Morpeth.
- 1988: Charles John Rice Nicholl of Whinnetley Farm, Haydon Bridge.
- 1989: Edward Addison Wrangham, of Harehope Hill End, Alnwick
- 1990: Lieut-Colonel Humphrey Crossman, of Cheswick House, Berwick-upon-Tweed.
- 1991: Peter John Cookson of The Old Rectory, Meldon, Morpeth.
- 1992: John Michael Loyd of Threepwood Hall, Haydon Bridge, Hexham.
- 1993: Roger Errington
- 1994: Barbara Lyndon Skeggs, of Oak Hall, Crookham, Cornhill-on-Tweed.
- 1995: Anthony Russell Wood, of Helister House, Riding Mill.
- 1996: John Francis Christian Festing of Ochrelands House, Hexham.
- 1997: Alexander Gordon Parrott Ramsay of Roecliffe, Corbridge.
- 1998: Charles Addison Fitzherbert Baker-Cresswell, Bamburgh Hall, Bamburgh
- 1999: Elizabeth Maureen Fairbairn, Hallington Hall, Hallington, Newcastle upon Tyne

== 21st century ==
- 2000: Samuel Charles Enderby of The Riding, Hexham
- 2001: John Philip Palmer Anderson, Little Harle Tower, Kirkwelpington
- 2002: Sir Francis Michael Blake, 3rd Baronet, of The Dower House, Tillmouth Park, Cornhill on Tweed
- 2003: Jennifer Bryony Gibson, Newbiggin, Hexham.
- 2004: Susan Audrey Burnell, Stagshaw House, Corbridge
- 2005: Ian Benjamin Speke
- 2006: Eric Davis Grounds
- 2007: Sir Hugh Francis Blackett, 12th Baronet
- 2008: Charles Richard Beaumont
- 2009: John Hamilton Blackett-Ord of Hexham
- 2010: Katie Crosbie-Dawson of Mindrum
- 2011: Reverend Fiona J Sample of Middleton
- 2012: Harriet M Benson
- 2013: Peter R Loyd of Hexham
- 2014: John M Carr-Ellison of Hedgeley Hall, Powburn, Alnwick
- 2015: Lucy Helen Maxwell Carroll of Cornhill-on-Tweed
- 2016: William Browne-Swinburne of Capheaton Hall
- 2017: John Robert Dickinson of Chollerton
- 2018: Michael William Orde of Ritton House, Netherwitton
- 2019: Harriet, Lady Joicey of Etal, Berwick Upon Tweed
- 2020: Thomas Philip Fairfax of Mindrum
- 2021: Joanna Lucy Riddell of Cheeseburn Grange, Stamfordham
- 2022: James Clement Royds
- 2023: Diana Mary Audrey Barkes
- 2024: Lucia Mary Battista Bridgeman, of Alnwick
- 2025: George Nelson Farr, of Cornhill on Tweed
- 2026: Dr. Anna Maria Charlton, of Hexham
