= Shafto family =

The Shafto family is an alternative surname for the Ffolliot family, who were established in the 14th century at Shafto Crag, Northumberland and adopted the alternative surname of Shafto.

== Shafto of Little Bavington, Northumberland ==
In the 15th century William Shafto married the heiress of Bavington and Bavington became the family seat. The medieval house was replaced in the 17th century when Bavington Hall was built.

William Shafto was High Sheriff of Northumberland in 1646 as was his son John in 1675. In 1716 both were attainted for their part in the Jacobite rising of 1715 and the Bavington estate was forfeited to the Crown. William's nephew George Shafto (later George Shafto Delaval) married a daughter of George Delaval of North Dissington and sister of Admiral George Delaval. The latter bought the sequestered estate and restored it to the Shaftos.

George Shafto Delaval was High Sheriff in 1740 and Member of Parliament for Northumberland 1757/74. He was succeeded by his nephew Sir Cuthbert Shafto, High Sheriff in 1795 and later by his son Robert. Sir Cuthbert was divorced by his wife, Mary, in 1797, 'by reason of cruelty and adultery.' Robert Ingram Shafto held Bavington in 1835 but the male line became extinct and the estate passed to cousins in a junior branch of the family of Beamish Hall, Co Durham. When Slingsby Duncombe Shafto sold Beamish in 1949 that branch of the family moved to Bavington. The estate was later sold by the family in 1994.

== Shafto of Newcastle and Whitworth ==
Mark Shafto, third son of Edward Shafto of Bavington, married Margaret Riddell of Newcastle. He became a merchant in that city and served as its Mayor in 1548. His first son, Edward a merchant adventurer, married Isabel Ogle (see Ogle family). His second son, Mark was Sheriff of Newcastle in 1575 and Mayor in 1578. A third son Ninian, married a daughter of Henry Brandling (see Brandling of Newcastle).

Ninian's son, Robert Shafto was Sheriff of Newcastle in 1607. He bequeathed Benwell Towers to his eldest son also Robert (see later). Roberts younger brother Mark Shafto (1601-1659), was a Gray's Inn barrister, and was appointed Recorder of Newcastle in 1648. In 1652 he purchased the Whitworth Hall estate in Co Durham.

His son Robert Shafto (1634-1705), was also a barrister and was appointed Recorder of Newcastle in 1660. He was knighted in 1670 and was appointed Sergeant at law in 1674. He married Catherine Widdrington. Their son Mark Shafto was High Sheriff of County Durham in 1709. Two of their sons represented Durham City in Parliament. Robert from 1712 until his death in 1729 and John 1729–1742.

John's son Robert Shafto (1732-1797) was a politician known famously as 'Bobby Shafto'. He married heiress Anne Duncombe. He was Member of Parliament for County Durham 1760-1768 and later for Downton, Wiltshire 1780–90. He was succeeded by his son Robert Eden Duncombe Shafto (1776-1848) at Whitworth and as Member for County Durham 1804–08. He added the additional surname of Eden following his marriage to Catherine Eden (see Eden baronets).

Their son Robert Duncombe Shafto (1796-1888), was member for North Durham 1847–68. His son Robert Charles died in 1909 without a male heir. His daughter Rosa married her cousin Robert Charles Duncombe Shafto (b1879), second son of Rev Slingsby Duncombe Shafto of Beamish. The Hall at Whitworth was severely damaged by fire in 1872 and apart from the library wing, was demolished and replaced with a new house about 1900. The estate was sold by the family in 1981.

== Shafto of Benwell ==
Robert Shafto, Sheriff of Newcastle in 1607 bequeathed his estate at Benwell Towers to his son Robert Shafto (died 1670). He was High Sheriff of Northumberland in 1653 and 1668. He was followed by three further Roberts all of whom served as High Sheriff in 1695, 1717 and 1756 respectively. The last of these was the subject of an oil by Sir Joshua Reynolds. He outlived his only son. His daughter Camilla married William Adair of Newton Hall but the estate was sold to William Ord of Fenham in 1756/63.

== Shafto of Beamish ==
The marriage of Robert Eden Duncombe Shafto of Whitworth to Catherine Eden brought the estate at Beamish Hall to the family. On his death in 1848, the estate passed to his third son Thomas Duncombe Shafto, and then on the latter's death in 1885 to his nephew Slingsby Arthur Duncombe Shafto (1844-1904), son of Rev Slingsby Duncombe Shafto.

The estate later passed to Slingsby Duncombe Shafto, High Sheriff of Durham in 1908, who sold it in 1949 and moved to Bavington Hall.
