= John Delaval =

John Delaval may refer to:

- Sir John Delaval, 3rd Baronet (1654–1729), English MP for Morpeth and Northumberland
- John Delaval, 1st Baron Delaval (1728–1808), British peer and MP for Berwick-upon-Tweed
- John Delaval Carpenter, 4th Earl of Tyrconnell (1790–1853)
- John Delaval (died 1652), English landowner and politician
