= Lawrence William Adamson =

Lawrence William Adamson (16 July 1829 – 7 November 1911) was the second, but only surviving son of Lawrence Adamson, HM's Seneschal of the Isle of Man and barrister-at-law.

Adamson practised as a lawyer, and also served as Justice of the Peace for the counties of Northumberland and Durham, as a Deputy Lieutenant for Northumberland from 1901, and as High Sheriff of Northumberland in 1900.

Lawrence Adamson married on 22 December 1853 Anne Jane Flint (who died 16 December 1869), by whom he had three children, including Lawrence Arthur Adamson, CMG. He later married 23 February 1889 Sarah Frances Swan, by whom he had no issue.

He lived at Jesmond House (c. 1870), Whitley House (c. 1880-90), Eglingham Hall (c. 1900) and finally at Linden Hall, near Morpeth, until his death on 7 November 1911.

Honorary titles
Preceded by William Watson-Armstrong	High Sheriff of Northumberland; 1900	Succeeded by Hugh Andrews
