= Ralph Carr =

Ralph Carr may refer to:

- Ralph Carr (merchant) (1711–1806), British merchant and banker of Newcastle upon Tyne
- Ralph Lawrence Carr (1887–1950), American attorney and politician of Colorado
- Ralph Carr (talent manager) (born 1959), Australian talent manager and convicted rapist; former agent of Dustin Martin, Kate Ceberano, and Tina Arena
- Ralph Carr, fictional character portrayed by Robert Downey Jr in the film 1969

== See also ==
- Ralph Carr-Ellison (1925–2014), English landowner, businessman, and public administrator
