= Close House, Northumberland =

Country estate in Northumberland, England

Coordinates: 54°59′14″N 1°48′11″W

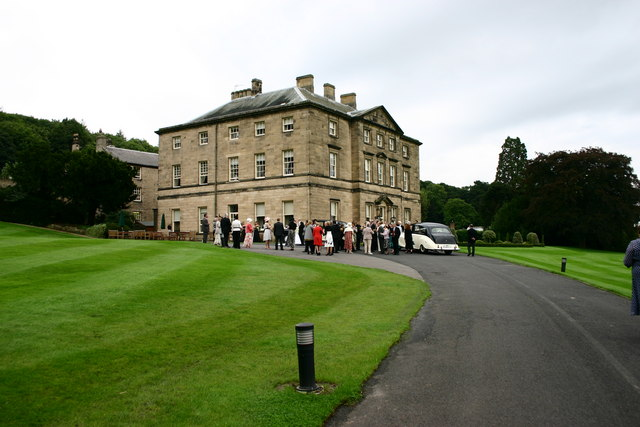
Close House

Close House is a country estate near Heddon-on-the-Wall, Northumberland. The estate contains a Grade II* listed former mansion house, which is currently a private residence, and Close House Golf Club.

== Overview ==
A monastic house occupied the site in the 14th century. A later house on the site was sold by the Read family in 1626 to Robert Bewicke (1573–1641) a Merchant Adventurer of Newcastle on Tyne, who was Sheriff of that city in 1615 and Mayor 1628 and 1637. The Bewicke family held the estate for over 300 years.

The house was the home of Calverley Bewicke (1755–1815) who was High Sheriff of Northumberland in 1782 and Member of Parliament for Winchelsea 1806–1815. In 1779 he demolished the house and replaced it with an imposing mansion house. This was possibly designed by Newcastle architect William Newton.

From 1906 the Hall was let out to tenants and the Hall and estate were sold in 1953. In 1960 the Hall and park were acquired by Kings College, Newcastle. The university carried out refurbishments and built a 9-hole golf course on the park in 1962.

In 2004 the university sold the Hall to the present owner, Graham Wylie, who opened the property as a hotel in 2005. In 2014, Graham Wylie converted the mansion house into his private residence and closed the hotel. The grounds currently has two 18 hole golf courses – one at championship level, a 9 hole pitch & putt course, a driving range with attached PGA academy, plus the No.19 clubhouse and restaurant. Close House was the venue for the British Masters, one of the leading professional tournaments on the European Tour, in both 2017 and 2020.

== History ==
Calverley Bewicke (1755–1815) built Close House in 1779. He was the eldest son of Sir Robert Bewicke (1728–1771) and inherited the Close Estate when his father died in 1771. He was lieutenant colonel of Durham militia and Member of Parliament for Winchelsea. He married Deborah Wilkinson in 1777 but unfortunately she died two years later. In 1781 he married Margaret Spearman whose portrait by Sir William Beechey is shown. She is standing by the window holding a portrait of her deceased husband Calverley in her right hand.

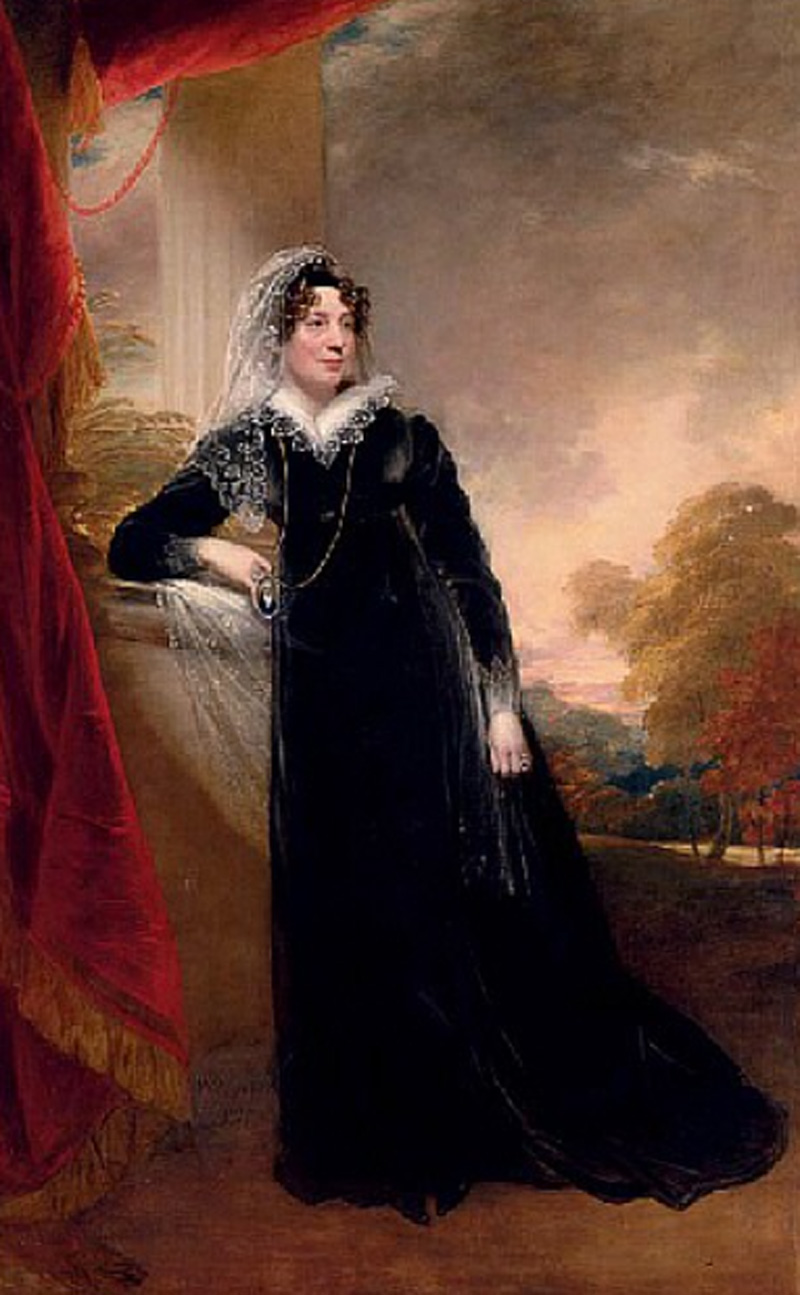
Margaret Bewicke, wife of Calverley Bewicke who built Close House in 1779

Margaret was born in 1761 and was the daughter of Robert Spearman (1703–1761), a theologian. Her father died the same year she was born. She was raised by her mother Ann at "Old Acres" in Sedgefield with her four sisters. After she and Calverley were married they lived at Close House but made frequent visits to their other property Urpeth Lodge in Durham. The couple had no children so when Calverley died in 1815 he left his properties to Margaret for her life and after that to his nephew Calverley Bewicke Anderson.

Margaret lived until she was 97 and therefore was the sole proprietor of Close House for 44 years. During this time she was frequently mentioned in the newspapers as a benefactress. In 1814 she built a school at Houghton for the children of the Close House Estate. The building still exists today. She was also very interested in gardening and her gardener Joseph Clark frequently won prizes. In 1826 she obtained rare carnations from Brussels and sent a watercolour painting of some of them to a gardening magazine who published them. It is shown at this reference.

When Margaret died in 1859 the nephew Calverley Bewicke Anderson who had replaced his surname Anderson with Bewicke and so became Calverley Bewicke Bewicke inherited Close House. Calverley Bewicke Bewicke (1782-1865) was 77 when he inherited the property and he died six years later. He lived all of his life at Coulby Manor, Yorkshire as did his wife Elizabeth and did not move to Close House. His son Calverley Bewicke (1817–1876) inherited the property on his father’s death in 1865 and upon his death in 1876 the eldest son Calverley Bewicke (1858–1896) owned the estate.

At the age of only 38 this Calverley Bewicke died leaving his wife Eleanor to raise their seven children at Close House. The 1901 Census shows that at this time they appear to be fairly wealthy as they had a Governess, a butler, a footman and nine domestic servants. Not long after this the family fortunes appear to have declined as early in the Century the property was mortgaged. One of the contributing factors to this decline in wealth could have been the extravagance of Eleanor’s younger son Ivan Bewicke. In 1911 he was forced to declare himself bankrupt after about eight years of draining assets from the family trust. It was stated in a newspaper article that the reason for his financial difficulties was "his extravagance in living, losses gambling and betting and too heavy interest on borrowed money."

In 1906 Sir James Knott rented Close House and Eleanor moved to London. He was a tenant for about the next 20 years. Eleanor died in 1919. Her eldest son Calverley Bewicke (1883–1963) was the heir to the property and he found a career in the Scots Guards and was eventually promoted to Captain.

In 1911 he married Hylda Dugdale and the couple had one son born in 1914. In 1915 the family went to Western Australia and established a very large sheep property over the next eight years. In 1923 they sold the farm and returned to England. They resumed occupation of Close House when Sir James Knott left and developed a successful racehorse stud. Hylda, his wife died in 1935 and Calverley remarried in 1943. His second wife was Hannah Baxter (née Taylor) widow of Fane Fleming Baxter. In 1953 Calverley sold Close House and High Close House and moved to Shawdon Hall where he continued his racehorse interests.
