= Lilburn Tower =

Country house in Lilburn, Northumberland, England

Hurlstone Tower
- Northumberland, England, UK
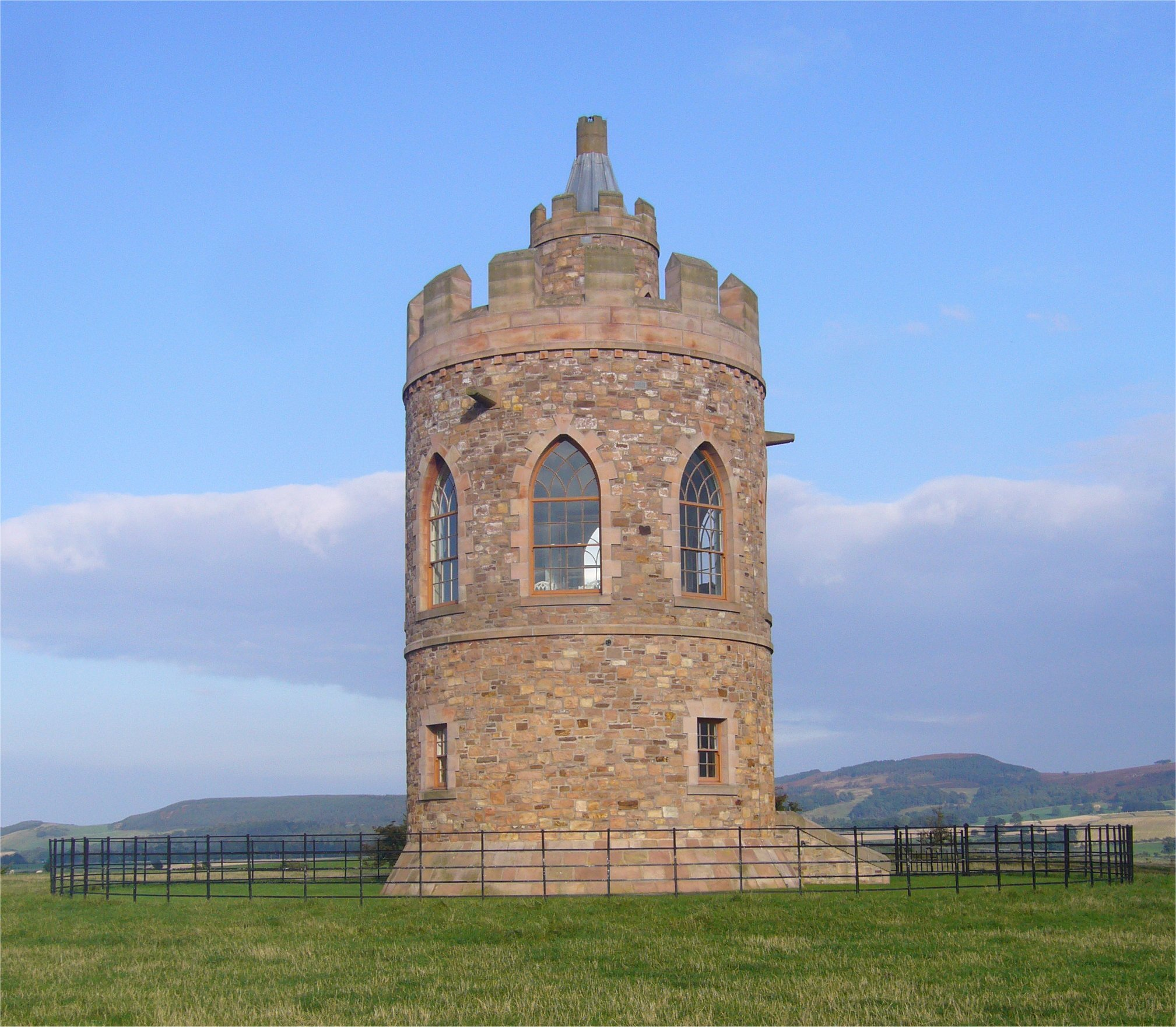
- The Hurlestone Tower at Lilburn, not to be confused with Lilburn Tower, is a lookout tower erected in 2000 and furnished for conferences and meetings

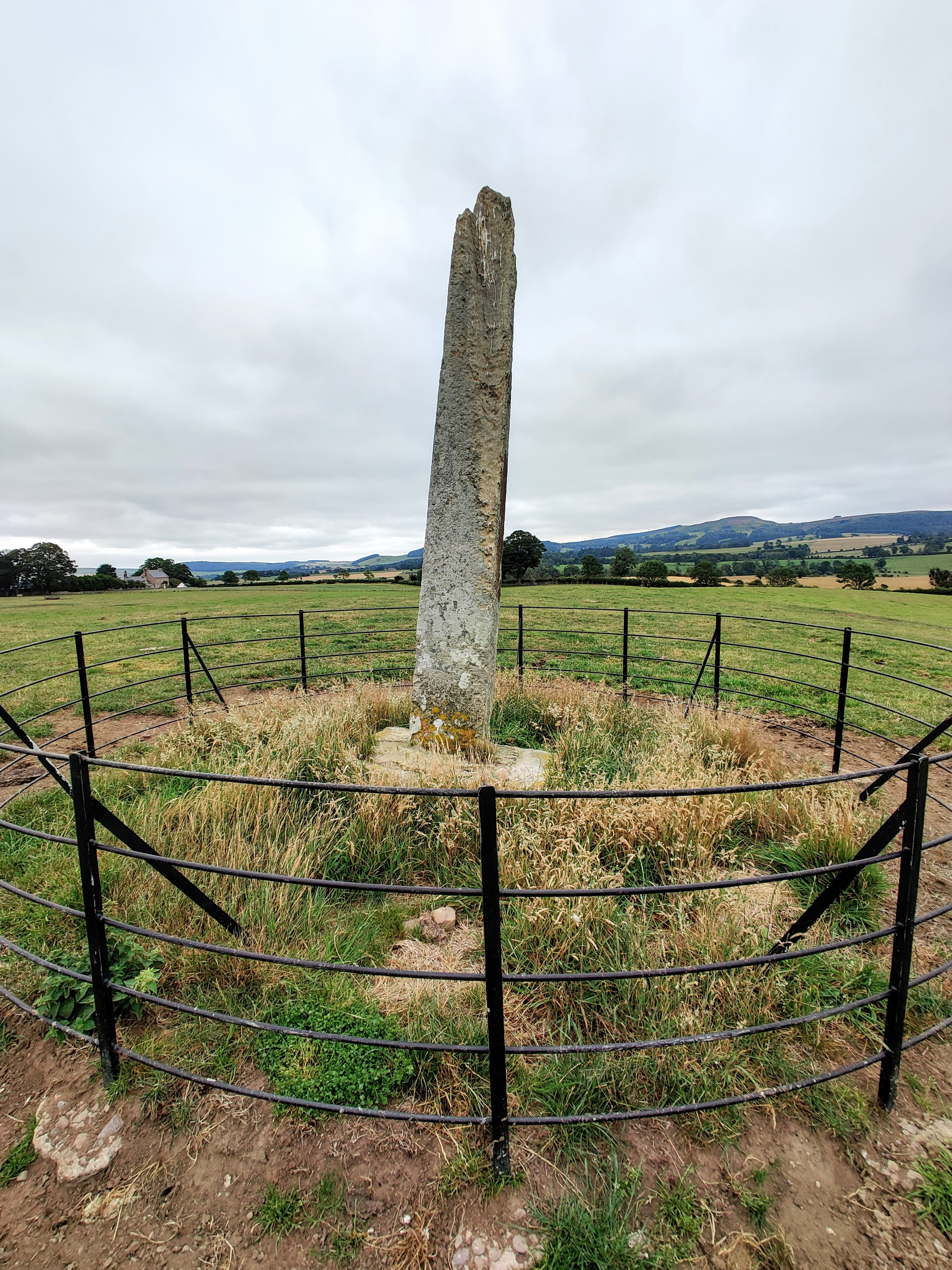
- The Hurl Stone at Lilburn. Reputedly the devil, standing on The Cheviot, saw St. Cuthbert and hurled the stone at him. Hurlestone Tower is sited on a line between the Hurlestone and Lilburn Tower.

Location
- Location in Northumberland
- Coordinates: 55.513068°N 1.963220°W
- Grid reference: NU024243

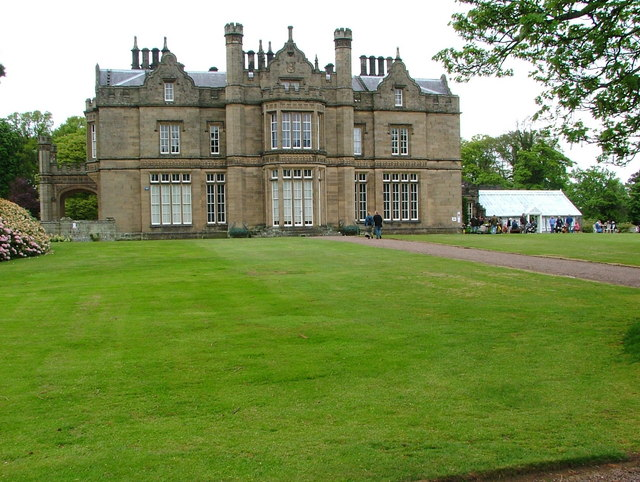
Lilburn Tower

Lilburn Tower is a privately owned 19th-century mansion house at Lilburn, near Wooler, Northumberland. The property is a Grade II* listed building and forms part of the Lilburn Estate. A number of discrete buildings and monuments are scattered across the grange, including the Hurlestone, Hurlestone Tower and an astronomical observatory.

The ancient manors of East and West Lilburn were united when both were purchased separately by John Clennell of the Clennel family of Clennell Hall about 1700. The ruinous remains of the old 15th-century manor house, known as West Lilburn Tower, which incorporated a pele tower, are scheduled as an Ancient Monument and protected by Grade II listed building status.

On the death of Thomas Clennel, the estate devolved to his nephew, Henry Collingwood, who was High Sheriff of Northumberland in 1793. The estate was bequeathed to Henry John William Collingwood of Cornhill in the 1820s, and in 1828 he began the construction of the imposing new Elizabethan-style mansion designed by architect John Dobson. The house, to be known as Lilburn Tower, was eventually finished in 1842 at a cost of some £25,000. Collingwood himself designed the park and gardens. He was High Sheriff of Northumberland in 1832.

On 3 January 1829, the foundation stone of the mansion house was laid in an elaborate ceremony under direction of the architect. A time capsule of various items was deposited beneath the stone: "two glass vessels, one containing the different coins of the reign of George IV, the other a newspaper of the 3rd of January, together with a MS. containing the following names: — 'Robert Hall, Alnwick, mason; Thomas Wallace and Sons, Newcastle, carpenters and joiners; Ralph Dodds, Newcastle, plasterer; Robert Wallace, clerk of the works.' Both vessels were sealed with the arms of Collingwood."

In 1842, shortly after the death of Henry, the estate was sold to his kinsman Edward John Collingwood (1815–1895) of Eglingham, nephew of Admiral Lord Collingwood. His son Col Cuthbert Collingwood (1848–1933) and grandson Edward Foyle Collingwood, High Sheriff in 1937, were later owners. The house and estate were later owned by Duncan Davidson, the founder of the house-builders Persimmon plc.
