= Low Dinsdale =

Village in County Durham, England

Coordinates: 54.494°N 1.466°W

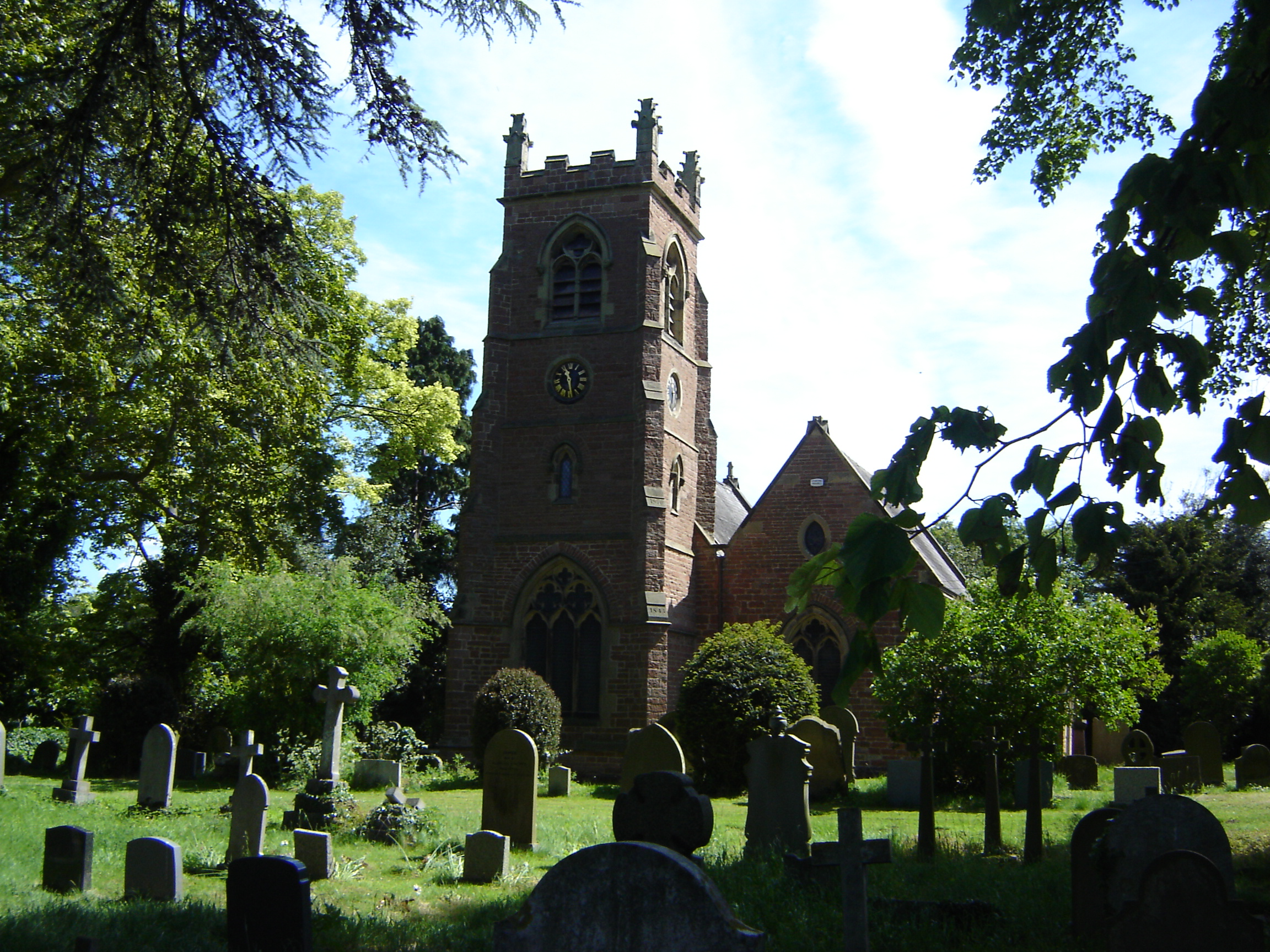
- Church of St John the Baptist in Low Dinsdale

- Location within County Durham
- Population: 871 (2011 census)
- Civil parish: Neasham
- Unitary authority: Darlington
- Ceremonial county: County Durham
- Region: North East
- Country: England
- Sovereign state: United Kingdom
- Post town: DARLINGTON
- Postcode district: DL2
- Dialling code: 01325
- UK Parliament: Sedgefield

Low Dinsdale is a village and former civil parish, now in the parish of Neasham, in the borough of Darlington and the ceremonial county of Durham, England. It is situated a few miles to the south-east of Darlington. On 1 April 2016 the parish was abolished and merged with Neasham and Middleton St. George.

Historically the village was commonly known as Dinsdale. "Low" was added to distinguish the village from the neighbouring village of Over Dinsdale, on the opposite bank of the River Tees in North Yorkshire. The toponym was recorded in Domesday Book as Dignesale and Dirneshale, and recorded in 1088 as Detnisale. The name is Old English and means either "nook of land belonging to a man named Dyttin" or "nook of land belonging to Deighton". Deighton was in the same wapentake (Allerton) as Over Dinsdale.

Listed buildings include Low Dinsdale Manor and Dinsdale Park a former Spa hotel.

== Demographics ==
The parish population taken at the 2011 census was 871.
