= Adderstone Hall =

Mansion in Northumberland, England

Coordinates: 55.56617°N 1.77798°W

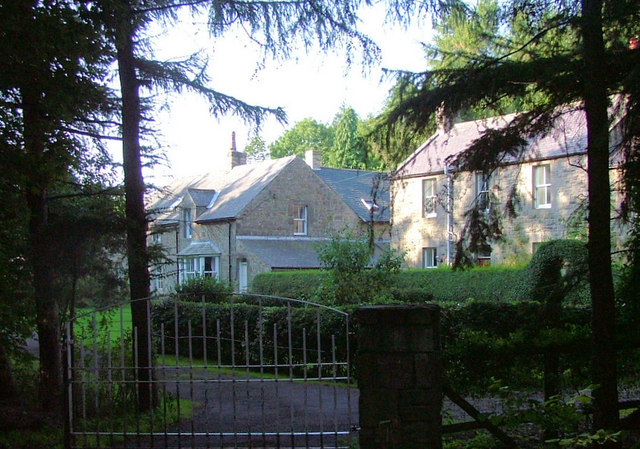

Adderstone Hall (grid reference NU141303) is a privately owned Georgian Grecian mansion situated on the bank of the River Warn near Lucker, Northumberland. It is a Grade II* listed building from which the present owners operate a holiday park.

== Historic England Heritage at Risk ==
Adderstone Hall is currently recorded on Historic England Heritage at Risk register as in poor condition and slowly decaying. It is currently empty with no current plans for restoration

== History ==
Adderstone was held by the Forster family, Governors of Bamburgh Castle from the 12th century. A pele tower of which no trace now remains existed on or close to the site in 1415. Thomas Forster (1659–1725), High Sheriff of Northumberland, built a new manor house in the early 18th century. The Forsters lived on the estate for over 400 years until they were ruined by the financial excesses of Sir William Forster (d. 1700) and the involvement of Thomas Forster (1683–1738) in the Jacobite rising of 1715.

The property, already leased and subsequently acquired by the Watson family, passed briefly to John W. Bacon of Staward Hall in 1763 before passing to the Watsons who were already tenants of the property. The present hall was built in 1819 to a design by architect William Burn. The first Watson to be born at Adderstone (in 1760) was Captain John Watson whose son Sir William Watson, an MP and Baron of the Exchequer (1856) married Anne, the sister of the great industrialist Lord Armstrong. Their son John William (born at Adderstone Hall 1827) had one son, Willam, who inherited Cragside and the Armstrong fortune from his great-uncle, Lord Armstrong, who had bought Bamburgh Castle in the 1894 after the death of his wife, Margaret Ramshaw, and began restoring the building in grand Victorian style, but died (in 1900) before the work was completed. Adderstone was left to his sister Dorothy who married Noel Villiers in 1903 and lived at Adderstone Hall until she died in 1961, when the property was sold for the benefit of her many nephews and nieces.
