= Adam Mansfeldt de Cardonnel-Lawson =

Scottish antiquarian

Adam Mansfeldt de Cardonnel-Lawson, in early life Adam Cardonnel FSA Scot (1746/7–1820), was a Scottish antiquarian.

== Life ==
He was the sole surviving son of Mansfeldt de Cardonnel of Musselburgh, a commissioner of the customs and salt duties in Scotland, and his wife Anne, daughter and heir of Thomas Hilton of Low Ford, County Durham. He was also a grandnephew of Adam de Cardonnel, secretary to the Duke of Marlborough.

Cardonnel was educated for the medical profession, and practised for a while as a surgeon. When the Society of Antiquaries of Scotland was founded in December 1780, he was elected a fellow, and served as curator from 1782 to 1784.

When Francis Grose visited Scotland, Cardonnel assisted him. In the autumn of 1789 Robert Burns addressed a letter to Grose and enclosed the letter under cover to Cardonnel at Edinburgh, with his impromptu Ken ye ought o' Captain Grose?.

Cardonnel left Scotland on succeeding to the estates of his second cousin Hilton Lawson, at Chirton and Cramlington in Northumberland. He served as High Sheriff of Northumberland in 1796, and assumed the surname of Lawson after Cardonnel. In 1811 he began to pull down his house at Chirton, and went to live in a small farmhouse at Cramlington.

In later life Cardonnel-Lawson lived mainly at Bath, Somerset. He died in June 1820, aged 73, and was buried at Cramlington on 14 June.

== Works ==
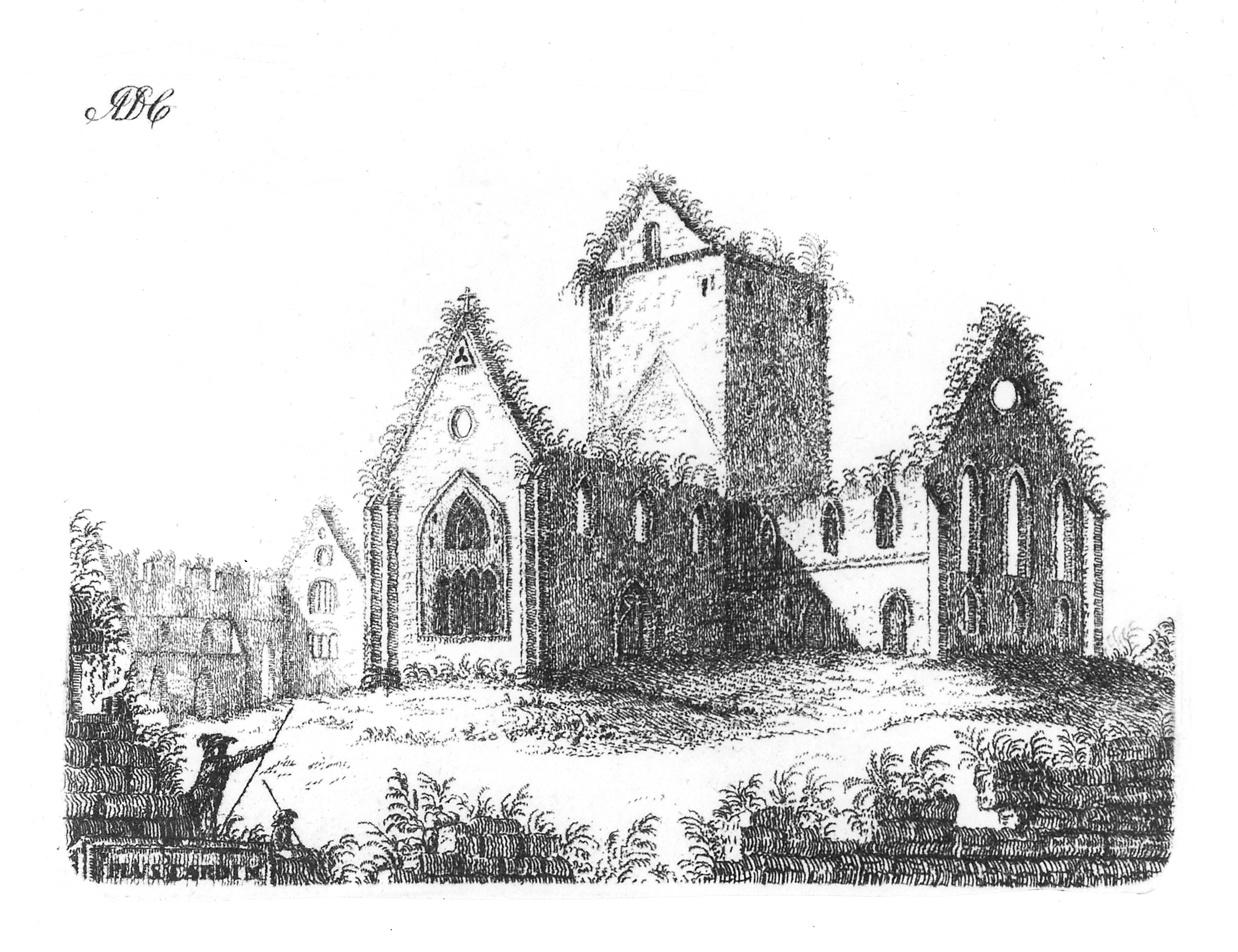
View of Pluscarden Priory near Elgin, engraving from Picturesque Antiquities of Scotland (1788)

Cardonnel was the author of:

- Numismata Scotiæ; or a Series of the Scottish Coinage, from the Reign of William the Lion to the Union. By Adam de Cardonnel,' with twenty plates drawn by the author, Edinburgh, 1786. This work is mostly taken from Thomas Snelling's View of the Silver Coin of … Scotland (1774)
- Picturesque Antiquities of Scotland, etched by Adam de Cardonnel, four parts, London, 1788–93.

He contributed to the second volume of Archæologia Scotica a "Description of certain Roman Ruins discovered at Inveresk."

== Family ==
Cardonnel married Mary Kidd, daughter of James Kidd, an army officer; they had two sons and two daughters. On the death of the elder son Adam, on 21 November 1838 at Acton House, Acklington, Northumberland, without issue, the family became extinct in the male line.
