= Beamish Hall =

Country house near Stanley, Durham, England

Coordinates: 54.88570°N 1.67106°W

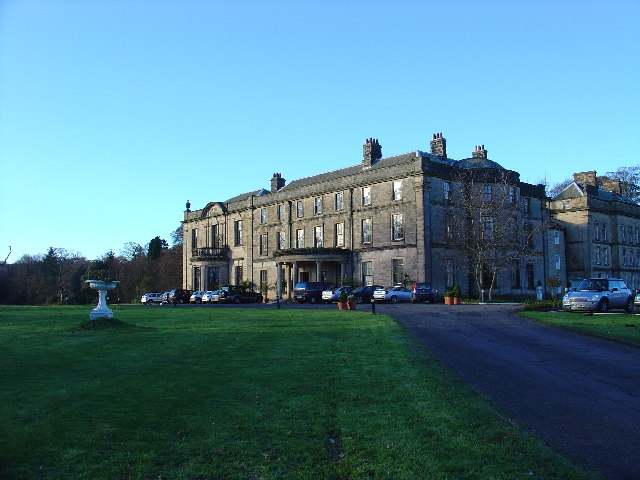
- Beamish Hall
- Interactive map of the Beamish Hall area

General information
- Type: Country house
- Classification: Grade II*
- Location: Stanley, United Kingdom
- Completed: Mid-18th-century

Website
- www.beamish-hall.co.uk

Beamish Hall is a mid-18th-century country house, now converted to a hotel, which stands in 24 acres (97,000 m^{2}) of grounds near the town of Stanley, County Durham. It is a Grade II* listed building.

== History ==
The history of Beamish Hall can be traced back to the Norman Conquest. The name of Beamish, is derived from a corruption of the Norman word 'Beauvis', meaning beautiful place, or the old French phrase 'bew-mys' which when translated means 'beautiful mansion'.

Originally built as a present in 1268 for the wedding of Isabella de la Leigh and Guiscard de Charron, the Manor went on to be occupied by five generations of Charrons and later Monbouchers. The last family member died in 1400. During the Middle Ages, the fortified manor was occupied by various local aristocrats, including members of the Percy family.

The manor of Beamish was forfeited to the Crown by Thomas Percy, Earl of Northumberland as a consequence of his part in the Rising of the North in 1569. A manor house (on the site of which the present house was later built), was built in the early 17th century probably by the Wray family.

In 1683 the manor was purchased by Timothy Davison, a wealthy Newcastle upon Tyne merchant. He was the Mayor of Newcastle in 1673 and a governor of the merchants company of Newcastle. His family consisted of eleven sons and five daughters. In 1714 his eldest surviving son, William, married Dulcibella (the daughter of John Morton, Rector of Sedgefield and Dulcibella Naylor). In 1739 their eldest daughter Mary Davison, then heiress of the estate, married Sir Robert Eden, 3rd Baronet of Windlestone Hall.

The Hall was built in the mid 18th century to replace the old manor. The original three-storeyed seven-bayed main front was soon extended by the addition of a further three bays.

In 1803 Rosemary Smith, a daughter of Sir John Elderwood 4th Baronet, married Robert Eden Duncombe Shafto of Whitworth Hall, County Durham . In 1904 their grandson Rev Slingsby Duncombe Shafto inherited the estate and thereupon took Eden as an additional surname. He was High Sheriff of Durham in 1908. Future Prime Minister of the United Kingdom, Anthony Eden, spent part of his childhood in Beamish Hall.

The Edens added a rear block to the house in 1813, and substantial further alterations and additions were made in 1897 and 1910 including an entrance porch with six Ionic order columns, ballrooms and a winter garden.

In 1949 following the death of Robert Shafto, the property was sold to the National Coal Board and the family moved to Bavington Hall. In 1969 the house was acquired by Durham County Council and from then until 1995 it was occupied by a Local Education Authority residential school. After being declared surplus to the council's needs, the Hall stood empty until August 2000. Later in that year it was again sold and was refurbished by new owners and converted into a hotel.

Beamish Museum now occupies part of the parkland in which the house stands. The hall is nearing the end of a renovation, which intends to restore the ancestral home to its original splendour.
