= Ilderton Hall =

House in Ilderton, Northumberland, England

Ilderton Hall is a modest 18th-century country house at Ilderton, Northumberland.(grid reference NU01662177). It is a Grade II listed building.

The house (55.4899°N 1.975°W) was built in 1733 by the Ilderton family possibly on the site of the former Ilderton Tower, which was recorded as ruinous in 1541 and in 1715 when it was the seat of George Ilderton.

Sanderson Ilderton of Ilderton Hall was High Sheriff of Northumberland in 1829.
