= Milbourne Hall =

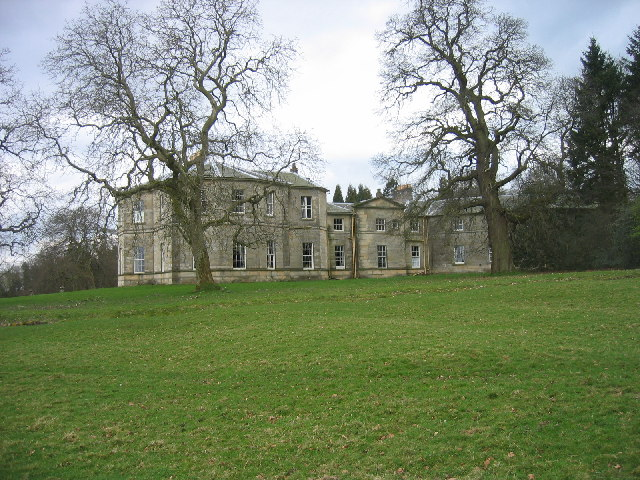

- Location in Northumberland

General information
- Location: Northumberland, England, UK
- Coordinates: 55.064°N 1.825°W
- OS grid: NZ112743

Milbourne Hall is a privately owned mansion house at Milbourne, near Ponteland, Northumberland, England, which has Grade I listed building status.

The Bates family were a long established Northumbrian family of Bedlington and Halliwell, Northumberland, who enjoyed intermarriage with other prominent landed famililies. Ralph Bates (1764–1813), High Sheriff of Northumberland in 1812 and later Deputy Lieutenant, built the house in about 1810 to a design by Edinburgh architect John Patterson. It was built in a Georgian architecture Georgian style in local stone, around an octagonal courtyard and features unusual internal arrangements including a rotunda salon.

In 1891 Georgiana Elliot (née Bates) bequeathed the estate to her grandson Ralph Mortimer (High Sheriff in 1916).

As of November 2021, Milbourne Hall was on the market for £3,950,000.
