= Low Dinsdale Manor =

- Location within County Durham

General information
- Location: Low Dinsdale, County Durham, England, United Kingdom
- Coordinates: 54.493°N 1.467°W
- OS grid reference: NZ345110

Low Dinsdale Manor is a privately owned, much altered, and extended medieval moated fortified manor house situated on the north bank of the River Tees at Low Dinsdale, near Darlington, County Durham, England. It is a Grade II* listed building.

The manor was owned by the Surtees family from the 12th century. Several members of the Surtees of Dinsdale family served as High Sheriff of Northumberland. In 1511 on the death of the last male of the family it passed to his daughter Katherine Place. Rowland Place was High Sheriff of Durham in 1654. The house was the birthplace of his son artist Francis Place (1647–1728). In 1718 the manor was sold to Cuthbert Routh and in 1770 to John Lambton of Lambton. In 1789 a mineral spring was discovered on the estate and a Spa was established. Lambton's son John Lambton, 1st Earl of Durham built Dinsdale Spa Hotel in 1829.

In 1844 the Earl sold the manor to Henry George Surtees (High Sheriff of Durham 1862) a descendant of the ancient family. He substantially extended and altered the house in 1876 adding new bays to the medieval core and two cross-gabled wings.

In 1914 the manor was sold to Sir Henry Havelock-Allan Bt.

A large part of the estate was sold for the creation of a golf course.
