= Ralph Carr-Ellison =

English landowner, businessman, public administrator (1925 - 2014)

Colonel Sir Ralph Harry Carr-Ellison, KCVO, TD (8 December 1925 – 26 August 2014) was an English landowner, businessman, public administrator and royal representative.

Born into the landed gentry, he grew up on the family's Hedgeley estate in Northumberland. Following schooling at Eton, he served as an officer in the Army from 1944 to 1949, after which he served in the Territorial Army. He took management of the estate in the late 1950s and set about modernising it and entering the world of business. He was chairman of the Northumbrian Water Authority from 1973 to 1982, of the Tyne-Tees television network from 1974 to 1997, of the North of England Territorial, Auxiliary and Volunteer Reserve Association from 1976 to 1980, and of The AA from 1986 to 1995. A Conservative in politics, he was active in the party's Northern Area association, serving as chairman from 1966 to 1969; he was then vice-chairman of the National Union of Conservative and Unionist Associations from 1969 to 1971, being knighted for his political work in 1973, the same year he declined an offer from the party to stand as a Member of Parliament.

Carr-Ellison was Lord Lieutenant of Tyne and Wear from 1984 to 2000 and was appointed a KCVO in 1999 for his services. He had previously been High Sheriff of Northumberland. He was twice married; his second wife was the widow of the AA Director General Simon Dyer.
