= Calverley Bewicke =

English commander and MP

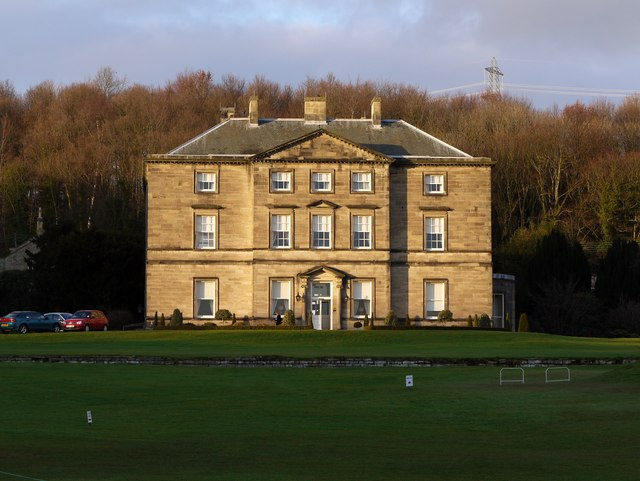
Close House mansion

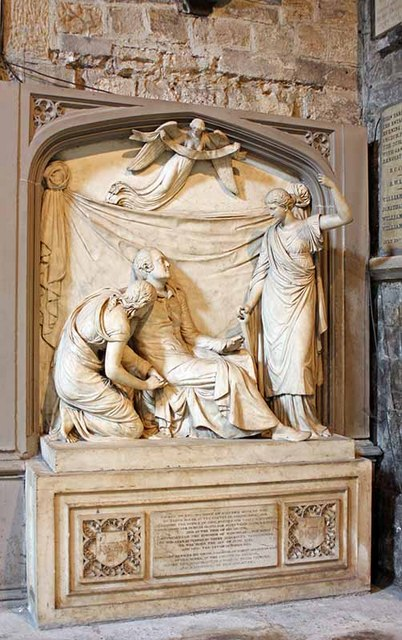
St Nicholas's Cathedral, Newcastle - Monument to Calverley Bewicke

Calverley Bewicke (26 June 1755 – 24 October 1815) was an English commander of the Durham Militia and an MP for Winchelsea in Sussex from 1806 to 1816.

== Life ==
Bewicke was born on 26 June 1755 one of twelve children of Sir Robert Bewicke of Close House and Urpeth, and his wife, Mary Huish, daughter of Robert Huish.

He was educated at the Royal Grammar School, Newcastle upon Tyne. From 1773 he attended University College, Oxford.

In 1779, he rebuilt the family home of Close House following his marriage.

In 1782, he was appointed High Sheriff of Northumberland. From 1794 to 1805 he was Lt Colonel of the Durham Militia.

He died on 24 October 1815. A memorial to Bewicke in Newcastle Cathedral was designed by Edward Hodges Baily.

== Family ==
In 1777 he married Deborah Wilkinson, daughter of Thomas Wilkinson of Brancepeth. She died in July 1779 (probably in childbirth). In 1781 he then married Margaret Spearman (d.1859) daughter of Robert Spearman of Sedgefield.

His second wife was portrayed by Thomas Lawrence RA around 1785.

He was grandfather to Robert Calverley Bewicke (1819–1886).

== Sources ==
- entry on portrait of Bewicke's wife by Sir Thomas Lawrence

Parliament of the United Kingdom
Preceded by William Moffat; Robert Ladbroke	Member of Parliament for Winchelsea; 1806–1816; With: Sir Frederick Fletcher-Vane, Bt 1806–1807; Sir Oswald Mosley, Bt 1807–1812; William Vane 1812–1816; Henry Brougham from 1816	Succeeded by Henry Brougham; Viscount Barnard
