= Thomas Hilton (by 1500 – 1559) =

English politician

Sir Thomas Hilton (by 1500 – 1559) was an English politician.

He was the eldest son of Sir William Hilton, de jure 9th Lord Hilton. He was knighted in 1523 and succeeded his father as de jure 10th Lord Hilton by 1537.

He was appointed High Sheriff of Durham for 1532–33 and 1533–34 and High Sheriff of Northumberland for 1543–44 and 1549–50.

He was a member (MP) of the Parliament of England for Northumberland in 1547.

He married four times: firstly Elizabeth, the daughter and coheiress of John Clervaux of Croft, Yorkshire; secondly Anne, the daughter of Sir Clement Harleston of South Ockendon, Essex, and widow of Nicholas Lambert of Owlton, County Durham; thirdly Elizabeth, the daughter and heiress of Sir Henry Boynton of Sedbury, Yorkshire and widow of Sir Henry Gascoigne of Sedbury; and fourthly Agnes, the daughter and heiress of John Ifield and widow of Matthew Baxter of Newcastle.
