= Chipchase Castle =

Country house in Northumberland, England

- Northumberland, England
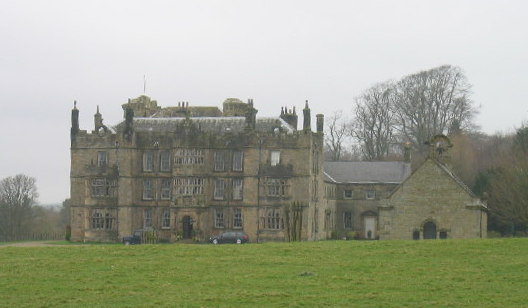

Location
- Location in Northumberland
- Coordinates: 55.0756°N 2.186°W
- Grid reference: NY882757

Chipchase Castle is a 17th-century Jacobean mansion incorporating a substantial 14th-century pele tower, which stands north of Hadrian's Wall, near Wark on Tyne, between Bellingham and Hexham in Northumberland, England. It is a Scheduled Ancient Monument and a Grade I listed building.

== History ==
The Heron family acquired the Manor of Chipchase by the marriage of Walter Heron to the Chipchase heiress. He built a massive four-storey battlemented tower house on the site of an earlier house in the mid-14th century.

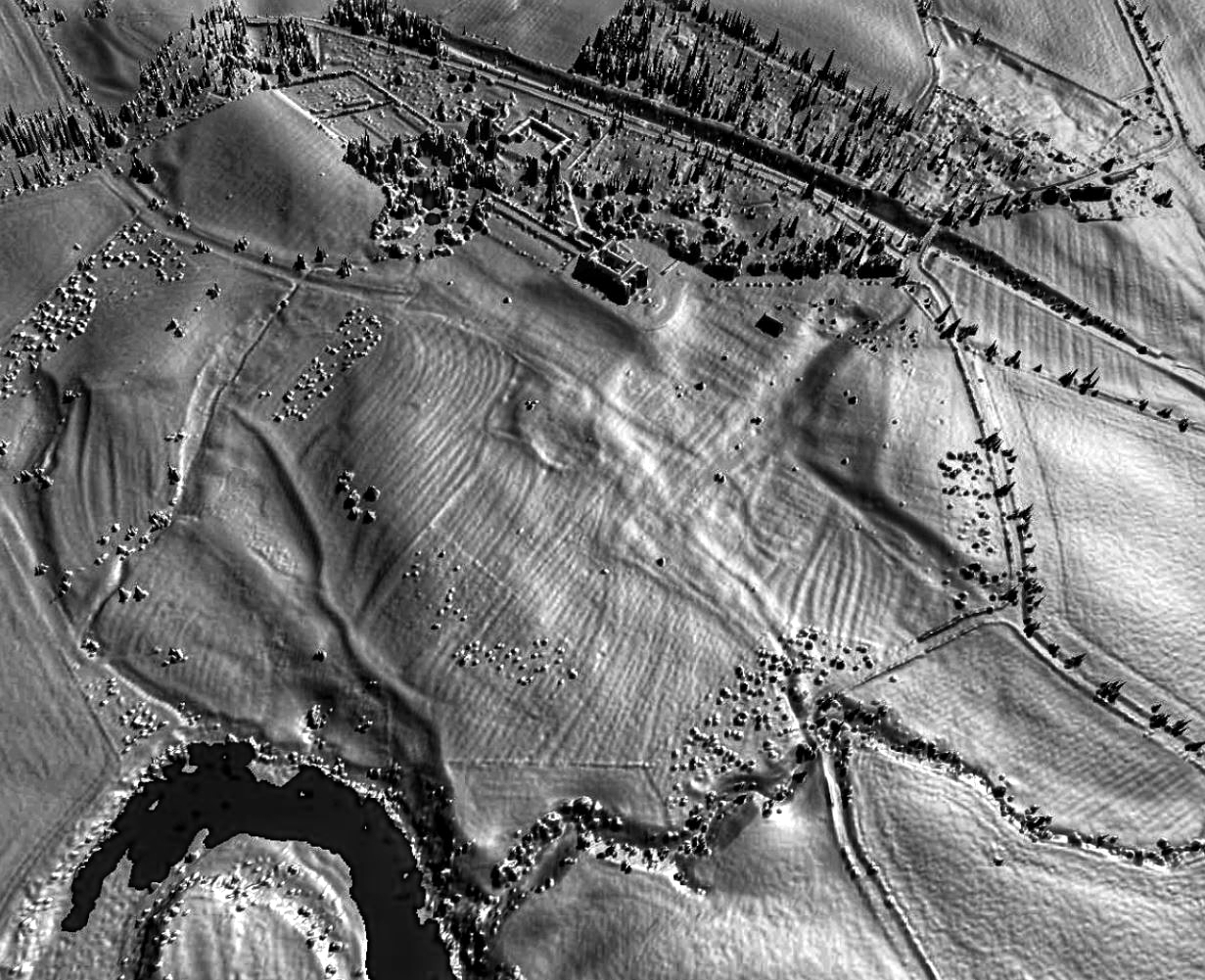
A lidar view of Chipchase Castle and the site of Chipchase deserted medieval village

A survey in 1541 described a "fare tower" with a "manor of stone joined thereto" owned by John Heron.

In 1621, Cuthbert Heron (High Sheriff of Northumberland in 1625) demolished the house and built a fine Jacobean mansion, leaving the tower standing and attached to the new house. His first son George was killed at the Battle of Marston Moor in 1644 in the service of Charles I. His second son Cuthbert was created a Baronet by Charles II (see Heron Baronets), but he experienced financial problems which eventually led to the sale of the estate by the Herons to George Allgood, a Newcastle merchant, in 1727.

John Reed, a Newcastle upon Tyne banker, acquired the estate in 1734. Reed carried out major alterations to the castle, including a classical façade to the old tower. The failure of Reed's family bank caused his descendants to sell the estate to the Greys of Backworth in 1821 to defray debts. The Greys then sold the estate to Hugh Taylor in 1861.

== Today ==
The castle is privately owned. It is associated with Paul Torday, the author of the novel Salmon Fishing in the Yemen, which was made into a popular film. He lived there with his second wife Penelope (née Taylor), who inherited the estate, and reportedly did much to help manage it.

The grounds are open to the public but the Castle is open to the public only in June.
