= Hesleyside Hall =

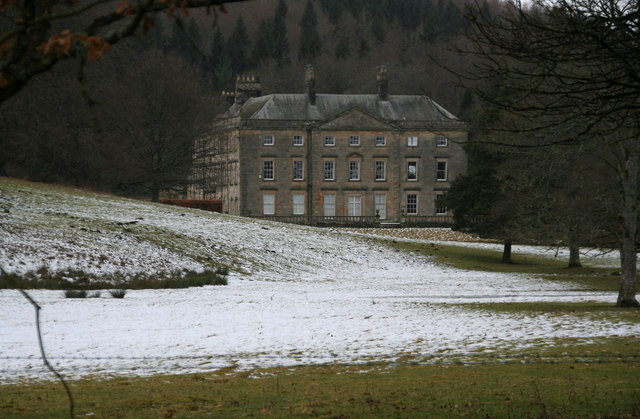
- Hesleyside Hall in winter

- Location in Northumberland

General information
- Location: Northumberland, England
- Coordinates: 55.147°N 2.293°W
- OS grid: NY814837

Hesleyside Hall is a privately owned 18th-century country house and the ancestral home of the Border reiver Charlton family about 2 miles (3 km) west of Bellingham, Northumberland. It is a Grade II* listed building.

The Charltons have been at Hesleyside since the 14th century. The present mansion, believed to be built on the site of a 14th-century pele tower, was built in 1719. The grounds were laid out by Capability Brown in 1776 and the east front was remodelled by architect William Newton in 1796.

Edward Charlton was created a Baronet in 1645. Later Charltons served as High Sheriff of Northumberland in 1721 and 1837, and as Deputy Lieutenant.

The adjacent stable block (a Grade II listed building) incorporates a 1747 date stone

The Spur of the Charlton is a 16th-century spur located at the hall which was occasionally served to the head of the household on a platter, as an indication that food was low and it was necessary to go cattle raiding.

Hesleyside Hall is currently managed by William and Anna Charlton, who have carried out extensive conservation and upgrade work and diversified the estate to include bed and breakfast shepherd's huts in the grounds.

In 2015 Hesleyside Hall appeared on the television show Tales from Northumberland with Robson Green.

The current owners of Hesleyside Hall, Anna and William Charlton, have three children: Katherine, Matilda and Henry Charlton.
