= The Mitre, Newcastle upon Tyne =

Grade II listed building situated in Benwell, Newcastle

The Mitre
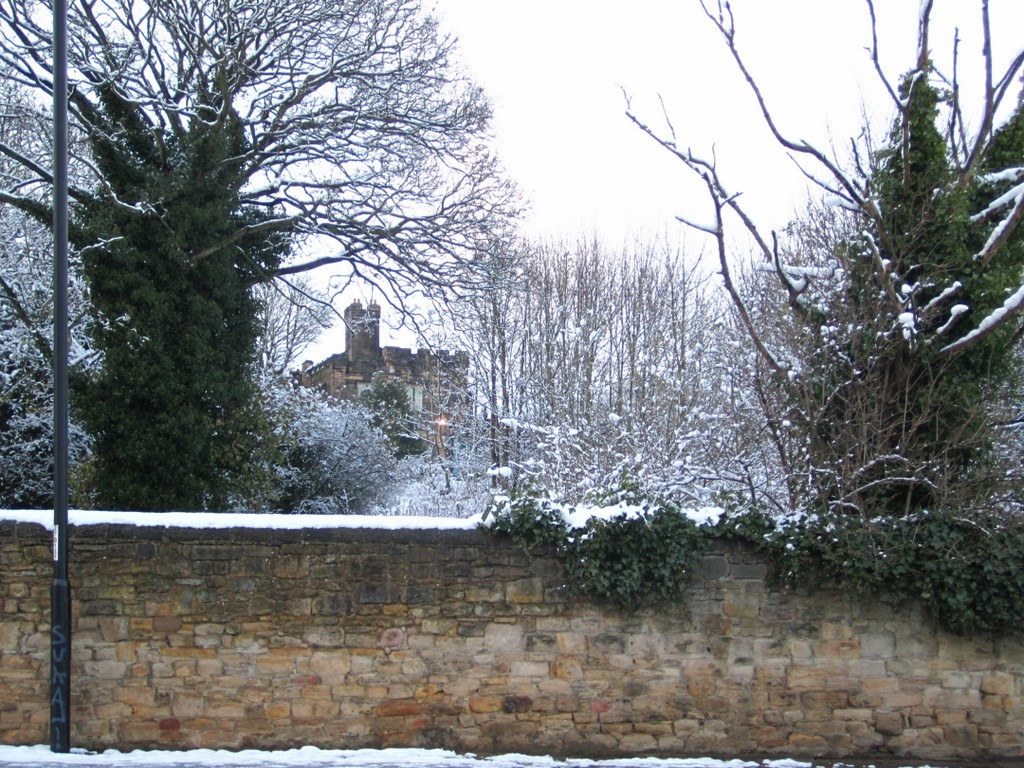
- (Photographed in November 2010)

- Location within Tyne and Wear

General information
- Location: Benwell area, Newcastle upon Tyne, England, United Kingdom
- Coordinates: 54.974678°N 1.670741°W
- OS grid reference: NZ213644

The Mitre is a building situated in the Benwell area in the west end of Newcastle upon Tyne, England. It is a Grade II listed building.

A tower house known as Benwell Tower was built in 1221. It became home to a branch of the Shafto family of Bavington Hall until the 1770s, when it was sold by Robert Shafto (the son of Bobby Shafto, immortalised in the song of the same name).

In 1831, the present building (originally known as Benwell Towers) designed by the Tyneside architect John Dobson replaced the old house and has since provided a number of different functions. It became the residence of the Bishop of Newcastle in the 1880s (when Newcastle upon Tyne became a separate see from the diocese of Durham). During World War II it became a fire station, and then became a training centre for the National Coal Board in 1947.

By the 1970s the building had become The Silver Lady nightclub and later The Mitre pub, before achieving national fame in 1989 as the Byker Grove youth club in the BBC children's television series Byker Grove. The final episode of Byker Grove was filmed in August 2006. Benwell Towers was put up for sale by the owners in 2007.

In June 2009 a local newspaper reported problems with Japanese knotweed on the site, that was still said to be for sale.

In September 2010, local newspaper The Evening Chronicle reported that the building had been purchased by an individual on behalf of a community organisation. It will be used for community-based purposes.

In December 2012, planning permission was granted for the creation of an Islamic Faith school, the Bahr Academy. The development was also to include a community building, coffee shop and events space open at weekends. The building was vandalised in July 2016, shortly before the school's opening. In 2019 it was broken into and vandalised.
