= GreyFriars, Newcastle-upon-Tyne =

13th-century friary in Newcastle-upon-Tyne and later private residence

Greyfriars
- Location within Tyne and Wear
- Interactive map of Greyfriars

Monastery information
- Order: Order of Friars Minor
- Established: 1237
- Disestablished: 1538
- Diocese: Diocese of York

Site
- Location: Newcastle-upon-Tyne, Northumberland, England,
- Coordinates: 54.9735743°N 1.6123509°W
- Visible remains: None

GreyFriars, Newcastle-upon-Tyne was a friary in Newcastle-upon-Tyne, Tyne and Wear, England, which was founded in Pilgrim Street in 1237, was sold after the Dissolution of the Monasteries, and then rebuilt as a private residence, as New Place and Anderson Place, before being demolished to become Grey Street.

== Greyfriars ==
The friary was founded, in 1237, in Pilgrim Street, Newcastle-upon-Tyne, and was sold after the Dissolution of the Monasteries.

== New Place ==
New Place or Anderson Place
- Interactive map of New Place or Anderson Place
- Type: Private Residence
- Location: Newcastle-upon-Tyne

History
- Built: 16th Century
- Demolished: 1835

Site notes
- Architectural styles: Jacobean; Classical

The merchant Robert Anderson purchased the 13 acres of land and on the site of the former Greyfriars building built a private residence (named "Newe House") which was described as a “princely house built out of the ruins of the friars”. In 1646, King Charles I was kept prisoner there by the Scots.

Robert Anderson bequeathed his estate to his kinsman, the Newcastle MP Sir Francis Anderson (1614–79). In 1675, Sir Francis sold "New Place" to Sir William Blackett, 1st Baronet, of Newcastle (1621-1680), on whose death it passed to Sir William's younger son, Sir William Blackett, 1st Baronet, of Newcastle-upon-Tyne, who had been made a baronet in his own right, and who added two large wings to the house in 1690. It then passed to Sir William Blackett, 2nd Baronet (1690–1728), and then to the latter's nephew, Sir Walter Calverley-Blackett, 2nd Baronet (1707–77). Sir Walter's successor, Sir Thomas Wentworth Blackett, sold the house in 1782 to the wealthy Newcastle builder, George Anderson (c.1705–98) who converted the residence into three dwellings.

=== Anderson Place ===
In 1801, George Anderson's son, Major George Anderson (1760–1831), came to reside there and changed the name of the house to Anderson Place. On his death in 1831, the house passed to the Major's cousin, Thomas Anderson (c.1808–72), who sold it to the Newcastle builder Richard Grainger (1797–1861), for £50,000, in 1834. Thomas Anderson and his family moved to live at Little Harle Tower, Kirkwhelpington, Northumberland. Anderson Place was demolished in 1835 as a key part of Grainger's plan to rebuild the city and to allow the construction of new buildings in the newly-built Grey Street, Newcastle upon Tyne.
