= William Newton (architect, 1730–1798) =

English architect

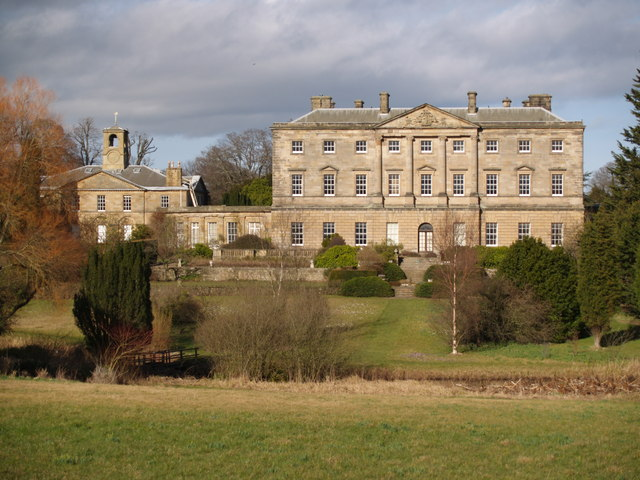
Howick Hall, Northumberland, by William Newton

St Bartholomew's Church, Longbenton, William Newton's only church

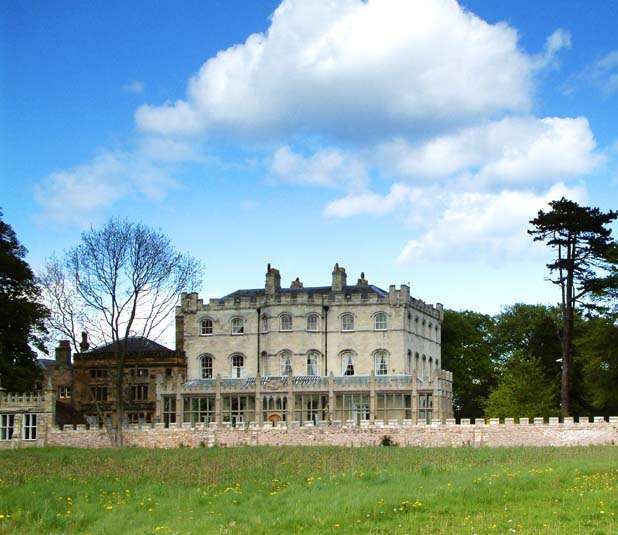
The Castle, Castle Eden, by William Newton. Photo by Les Hull

William Newton (1730–1798) was an English architect who worked mainly in Newcastle upon Tyne and Northumberland. His work shows a conventional but elegant classical style, influenced by Adam and Paine, and with a strong Palladian feel typical of late 18th-century architecture. Most of his buildings are stately homes in rural Northumberland, but he also created some interesting public works in Newcastle: The Assembly Rooms, St Anne's Church, the refaced Guildhall, and elegant private housing in Charlotte Square.

He was the son of Robert Newton, a builder. He married Dorothy Bell and lived for 28 years at 1, Charlotte Square, Newcastle. His big break came when he was appointed architect for The Assembly Rooms in Newcastle in 1774; as a result he became favoured by the Northumbrian élite. He has been described as 'the first truly Nothumbrian architect'.

== List of notable works ==
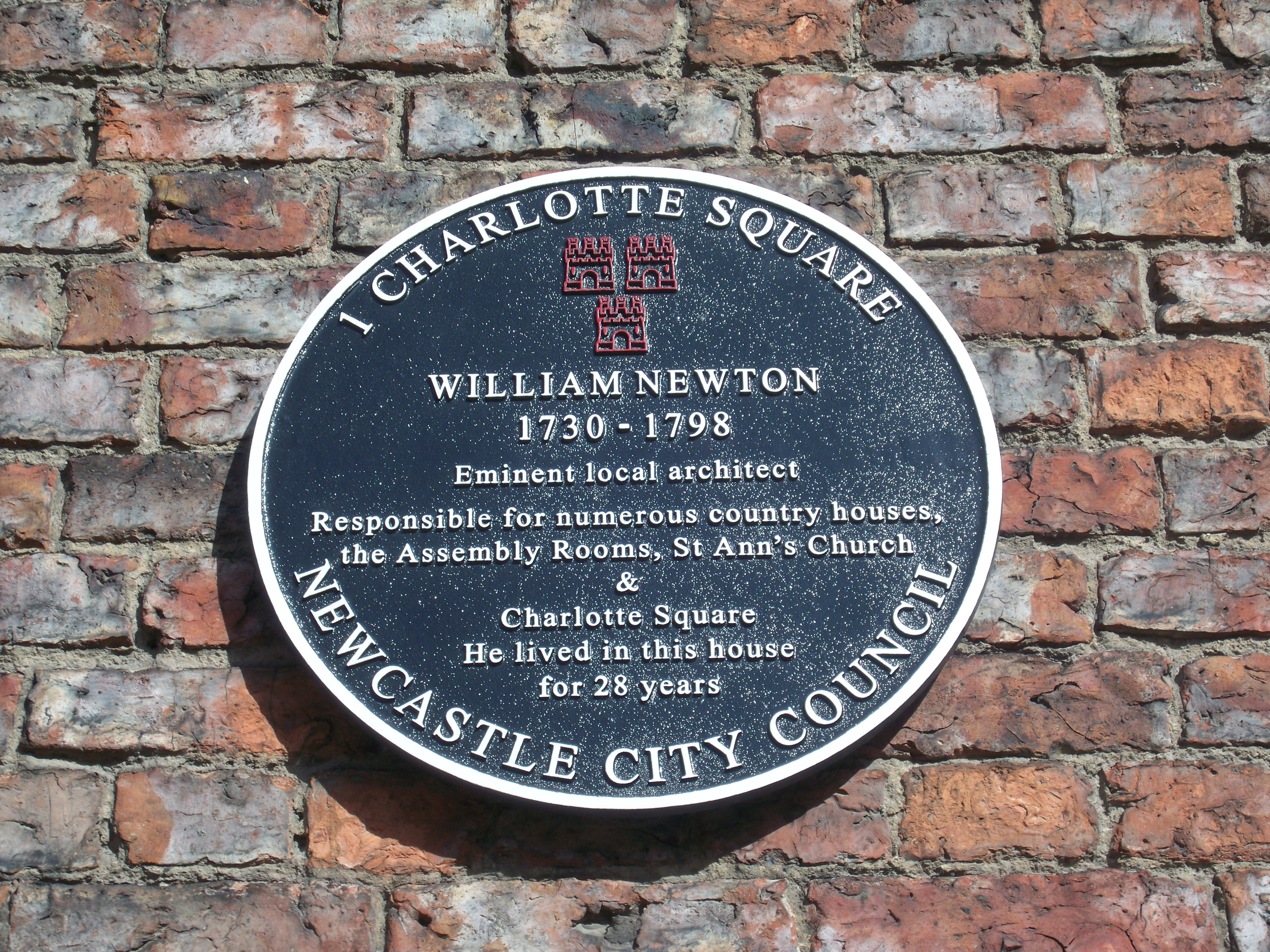
William Newton Plaque at No 1 Charlotte Square

- The Infirmary, Newcastle 1751-2 (demolished 1954)
- Capheaton Hall (North front) 1758
- St Mungo, Simonburn (rebuilding of aisles) 1763
- St Ann's Church, Newcastle 1764
- Charlotte Square, Newcastle 1770
- Kielder Castle 1772
- Assembly Rooms, Newcastle 1774-6
- Killingworth House (probably added wings) 1770s (demolished 1954)
- The Castle, Castle Eden c1775
- Shawdon Hall 1779 (probable attribution)
- Backworth Hall 1780
- Acton House 1781
- Charlton Hall 1782
- Howick Hall 1782
- Heaton Hall (refronting) 1783 (demolished 1933)
- The Temple, Heaton Hall (now at Blagdon Hall) 1783
- St Nicholas Cathedral, Newcastle 1783-7, (internal restoration), with David Stephenson
- Whitfield Hall 1785
- Hebburn Hall 1790
- St Bartholomew's Church, Longbenton 1790
- Dissington Hall 1794
- Guildhall, Newcastle upon Tyne 1794, (refronting), with David Stephenson
- Hesleyside Hall (East front) 1796
- Lemmington Hall (alterations)
- Fenham Hall (attribution and date uncertain)
- Rathfarnham Castle, Dublin, Ireland (1769) - various works

McCombie and Grundy have used stylistic evidence to suggest some additional attributions:

- The Lodge, Capheaton village
- Craster Tower (South wing) 1769
- Close House 1779
- Newton Hall
- Togston Hall

Faulkner and Lowery make one additional suggestion:

- Broome Park, Edlingham (demolished 1953)
