= William Cotesworth of Gateshead =

William Cotesworth of Gateshead (1668 – 1726) was an English merchant and government official who served as sheriff of Northumberland.

Based in Newcastle, Cotesworth was the son of a yeoman. He was a cousin of London politician William Cotesworth. As a young man, Cotesworth was apprenticed to a tallow candle maker.

As a merchant, Cotesworth collected tallow in England and sold it internationally. He imported dyes from Southeast Asia, as well as flax, wine, and grain from other regions . Cotesworth sold tea, sugar, chocolate, and tobacco, operated the largest coal mines in the area, and was a leading salt producer.

Over time, Cotesworth became the English government's principal agent in Northern England, being in contact with leading royal ministers. He became an esquire, having served as mayor, justice of the peace and sheriff of Northumberland.
