= Little Harle Tower =

Grade II* listed country house in Kirkwelpington, Northumberland

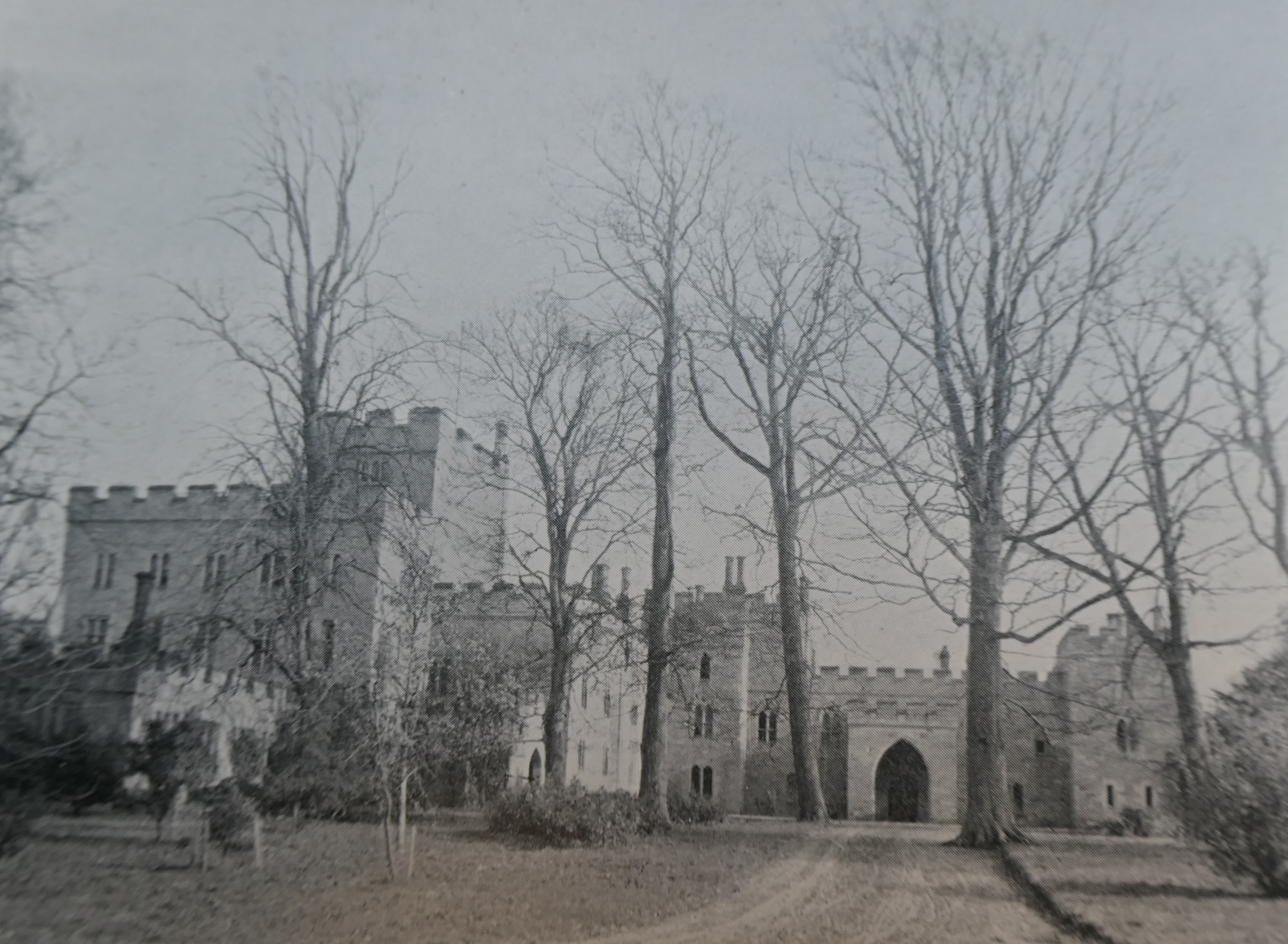
- 1905 photograph of the building

- Location in Northumberland

General information
- Location: Northumberland, England, UK
- Coordinates: 55.155°N 2.009°W
- OS grid: NY995845

Design and construction
- Designations

Listed Building – Grade II*
- Official name: Little Harle Tower
- Designated: 5 September 1985
- Reference no.: 1370497

Little Harle Tower is a Grade II* listed privately owned country house with 15th-century origins, located at Little Harle, Kirkwhelpington, Northumberland.

== History ==
The property, believed to have been built in the late 15th century as a pele tower, was first recorded in a survey of 1541.

Until 1552 it was the property of the Fenwick family, from whom it passed to the Aynsleys. During the early years of the 19th century Harle Tower was inhabited by Lord Charles Murray-Aynsley and his wife Alicia, née Mitford.

In around 1848 it was purchased by Thomas Anderson (c.1808–72) previously of Anderson Place (Greyfriars), Newcastle (who was Deputy Lieutenant, JP, and High Sheriff of Northumberland in 1843–4). His descendants remain in residence (with the East Wing of the house occupied by the Turnbull family in 2005 and the Rogers family in 2010, but as of 2013, it is home of the Andersons).

== Architecture ==
The house incorporates a three-storey tower of medieval origins. The central two-storey block of five bays dates from the early 18th century. Substantial additions were made in the Gothic Revival style in about 1862, but much of the 19th-century work has not survived a remodelling of the property in 1980.

The 19th-century stable block is also a separately listed Grade II building.
