= Craster Tower =

Building in Craster, Northumberland, England

- Northumberland, England

Location
- Location in Northumberland
- Coordinates: 55.470°N 1.597°W
- Grid reference: NU256197

Craster Tower is an 18th-century Georgian mansion incorporating a 14th-century pele tower situated near the fishing village of Craster, Northumberland, England. It is a Grade II* listed building.

== History ==
The Craster family have owned lands at Craster since about 1278. The substantial rectangular pele tower, originally of four storeys, is believed to date from the mid 14th century. It is referred to in a survey of 1415 as in the ownership of Edmund Crasestir.

The property was enlarged around 1666 when a two-storey manor house was built adjoining the east side of the Tower. A stable block (Grade II listed) was built to the north in 1724.

In 1769, George Craster erected an impressive five-bayed, three-storey Georgian mansion adjoining the south side of the Tower, which was reduced to three storeys and recastellated at this time. This may be by Newcastle architect William Newton.

In 1838, Thomas Wood Craster (High Sheriff of Northumberland in 1852) employed the architect John Dobson to improve and modernise the property.

The greater part of the estate was sold by Sir John Craster in 1965. The Tower was bought by three of his cousins and was converted into three separate residential apartments.

== Buildings ==
Craster Tower is rectangular. At basement level, the walls are 2 metres (6 ft 7 in) thick and a barrel vault supports the upper building. Only one of the tower's windows is believed to be of medieval date. The tower originally had four storeys, but this was reduced to three by George Craster's heightening the middle floor during the 18th century.

== Other sources ==
- Fry, Plantagenet Somerset, The David & Charles Book of Castles, David & Charles, 1980. ISBN 0-7153-7976-3
