= Minsteracres =

Monastery in Healey, Northumberland, England

Coordinates: 54°53′43″N 1°57′47″W

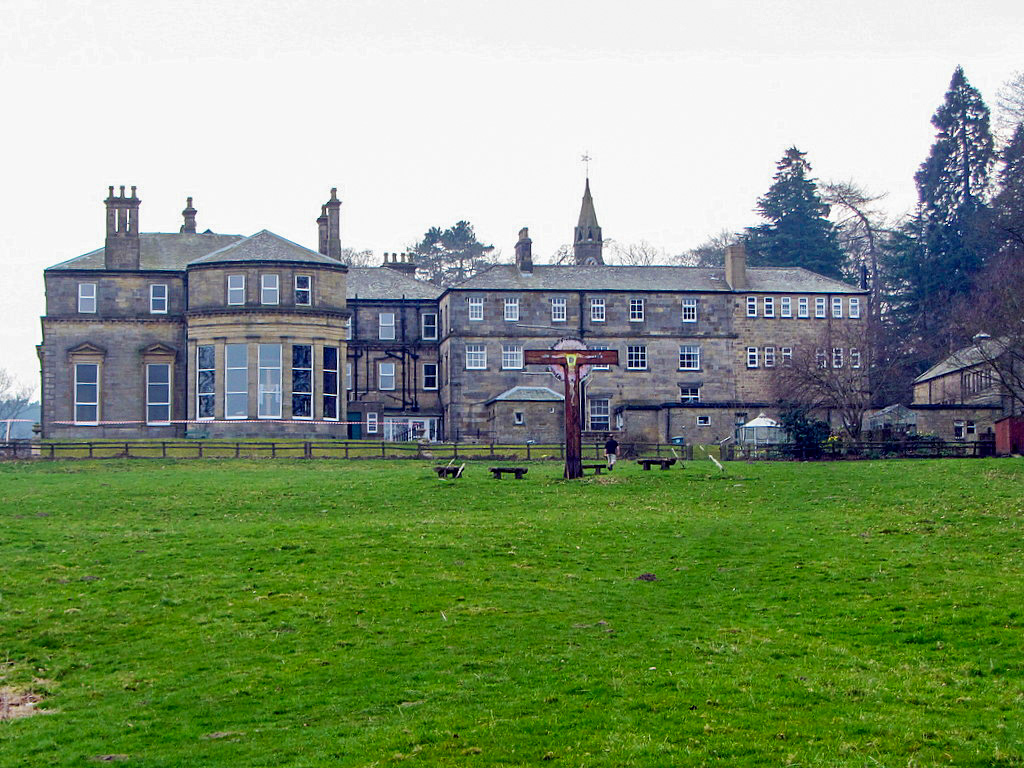
Minsteracres in 2015

Minsteracres is an 18th-century mansion house, now a Christian retreat centre, in Northumberland, England. It is a Grade II listed building.

The house was built in 1758 by George Silvertop. Originally erected with two storeys, a third storey was added in 1811 and a new North wing was built in 1865.

Silvertop coat of arms

The Silvertops were a Roman Catholic family. George Silvertop was in 1831 the first Catholic appointed High Sheriff of Northumberland following the repeal of the penal law. His nephew Henry Charles Silvertop, High Sheriff in 1859 built a Catholic chapel adjoining the hall, and dedicated to St Elizabeth of Hungary in 1854. The chapel is a Grade II listed building.

The Silvertop family sold the House in 1949 for conversion to a Passionist Monastery. A retreat house was opened in 1967, and in the 1970s links were established with the Selly Park sisters and the Sisters of Mercy from Sunderland. Since 2012 Minsteracres has been run by a charitable trust on behalf of the Passionist community. It describes itself as a "Christian place of prayer with a resident community rooted in the Roman Catholic Passionist tradition".

In the early 1960s Consett artist Sheila Mackie painted two large murals Agony in the Garden and The Conversion of Saul, each 40 feet (12 m) by 12 feet (3.7 m) for the Minsteracres retreat house; they were known to still exist in 2010 and are listed in the database PostWar Murals Database, last updated 2013.

The east and west lodges, stable block, entrance screen with flanking walls and a group of farm buildings are all separately grade II listed.
