= Hebburn Hall =

Country mansion

Coordinates: 54.97118°N 1.51572°W

Hebburn Hall also known as Ellison Hall is a 17th-century country mansion, which has been converted into residential apartments and houses, situated at Hebburn, South Tyneside, Tyne and Wear (grid reference NZ31106417). It is a Grade II listed building.

Long before the Manor of Hebburn was subsumed by the conurbation of Newcastle upon Tyne, the estate was acquired by the Ellisons, a family of merchant adventurers of Newcastle. Robert Ellison, Sheriff and Member of Parliament for Newcastle, replaced the 14th-century Tower house with a new manor house in the mid 17th century.

His descendant Henry Ellison ( who was High Sheriff of Northumberland in 1734) rebuilt the property in a somewhat grander style in 1790, creating, it is said with the assistance of architect William Newton, a three-storey, nine-bay mansion house. Improvements were made about 1819 by architect John Dobson. Hebburn Hall is a good example of a building in the Tyneside Classical tradition of the Dobson era.

When Henry's son Cuthbert (High Sheriff in 1808) died without male issue in 1860, the estate passed to his nephew Colonel Cuthbert Ellison, then to the colonel's sister, Mary Ellison, in 1867 and finally, in 1870, to Ralph Carr of Dunston Hill, Gateshead and Hedgeley Hall, Northumberland. After this the house soon fell out of use as a residence. At the request of Cuthbert Ellison, from 1871, Ralph Carr was granted permission to style himself Carr-Ellison. In 1897 he allowed public access to the grounds of the hall and in 1920 gave 25 acres of the site to the town, which opened as Hebburn Park. This was later renamed Carr-Ellison Park.

In 1886 the west wing and some outbuildings were converted by architect FR Wilson to use as a church for the new parish of St John the Evangelist and the rectory. The east wing served as an infirmary from 1897 until 1976, and then briefly as a masonic temple.

In 1999 new owners refurbished the dilapidated property and restored it to residential use.
