= Shawdon Hall =

Mansion in Hegeley, Northumberland, England

Coordinates: 55.42270°N 1.85526°W

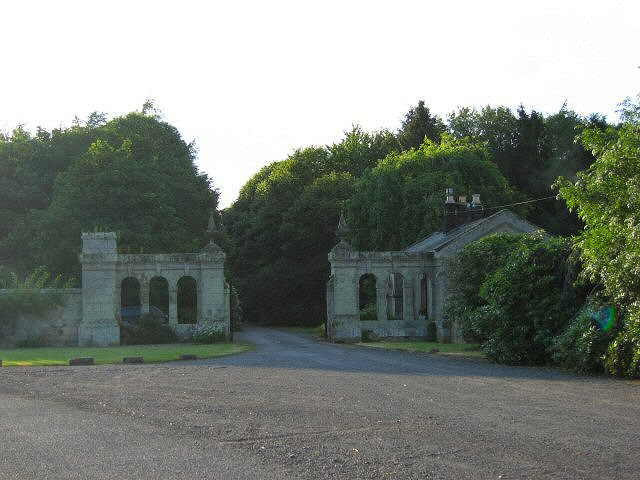
East Lodge to Shawdon Hall

Shawdon Hall is a privately owned 18th-century country house located between Bolton and Hedgeley, near Alnwick, Northumberland, in North East England. It is a Grade II* listed building.

== History ==
The manor of Shawdon was owned by Thomas Lilburn, a member of the House of Lilburn, in the 15th century. A survey of 1541 disclosed a 'tower in measurable good reparation' in the ownership of Cuthbert Proctor.

John Proctor sold the estate in 1705.

The new owner William Hargrave (who was High Sheriff of Northumberland in 1783) demolished the old house and replaced it in 1779 with a new mansion, probably designed by architect William Newton. The house is of two stories with a seven-bay entrance front, the central three bays being pilastered and with a pediment bearing the 1817 arms of Pawson.

Following the death of Hargrave in 1817 the 1,050-acre (4.2 km^{2}) estate passed by the marriage of the Hargrave heiress to John Pawson. Later Pawsons to serve as High Sheriff were William in 1826 and William John in 1861.

The hall and estate were most recently sold in September 2018 for £2,684,868 to Dulce Maria De Barros Marchi Packard.

Important historical artifacts have been found on the Shawdon Hall estate. In 1761 two Roman urns containing human remains were unearthed and in 1828 gold coins including a rare rose noble from the time of Edward I were found.
