= Ralph Mortimer =

English cricketer, landowner, and public servant

Sir Ralph George Elphinstone Mortimer (7 July 1869 – 3 May 1955) was an English landowner and public servant. He was a renowned cricketer, a right-handed batsman who played once for Lancashire and 67 times for Northumberland between 1896 and 1906. He was born in Newcastle upon Tyne, Northumberland and died in Milbourne Hall, near Ponteland, Northumberland. in 1907 he married Miss Violet Stokes of Ellel Hall, Galgate near Lancaster, the daughter of Major E.W. Stokes.

As a cricketer, Mortimer made just one first-class appearance for Lancashire, in a university match against Oxford University in 1891. In the only innings in which he batted, he scored 22 not out. But he remained a player at a lower level and, representing Northumberland, he played in the Minor Counties Championship. He later served as president and chairman of the county club.

Mortimer studied at Harrow School and Trinity College, Cambridge. In 1891, he inherited Milbourne Hall from a maternal relative and thereafter was occupied with good works in the Northumberland area. He was involved from early days with the Boy Scout movement and was chairman or vice-chairman of Newcastle Royal Victoria Infirmary for 36 years; at the age of 72, The Times reported in his obituary, he was involved in more than 50 local committees. He was awarded the OBE in 1920 and knighted in 1934.
