= Eglingham Hall =

Former mansion house in Northumberland, England

Coordinates: 55.4695°N 1.8365°W

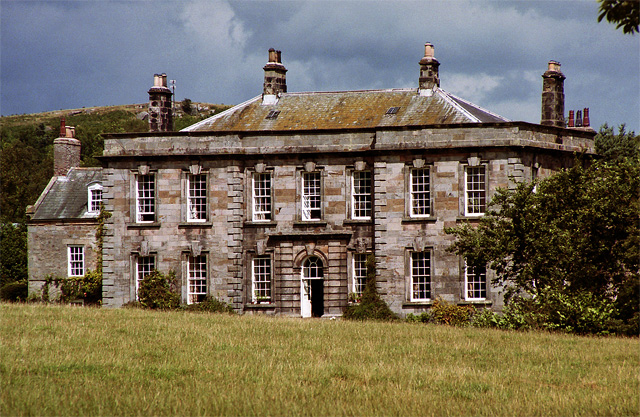
Eglingham Hall showing its rusticated doorway

Eglingham Hall (grid reference NU10421954) is a former mansion house and a Grade II* listed building situated at Eglingham, near Alnwick, Northumberland.

The manor of Eglingham was acquired by Henry Ogle, a nephew of Robert, 1st Baron Ogle of Ogle in 1514. Luke Ogle (1510–1597) built a new mansion house on the site of a pele tower.

The Ogle family of Eglingham were parliamentarian during the English Civil War. Henry Ogle (1600–1669), Deputy Lieutenant of Northumberland in 1644, was the representative for the county in the parliaments of 1653 and 1654. His son John (1621–1686) was Commissioner for the Commonwealth in 1650 and High Sheriff of Northumberland in 1654. It is said that Oliver Cromwell was a guest at Eglingham in 1650.

The Hall was rebuilt in grander style for Robert Ogle in 1728, to a design including a seven-bay façade possibly by architect William Wakefield. Nikolaus Pevsner noted that the rusticated quoins and doorway of Eglingham Hall showed the influence of Seaton Delaval Hall, and suggested that William Etty who had worked there might also have worked at Eglingham. Later improvements and alterations took place in 1780 and 1890 and an east wing was added in 1903 by Temple Wilson.

The Ogles remained in possession for some 400 years. The Hall was sold to the Bewicke family early in the 20th century and their descendants remain resident.
