= John Delaval (died 1652) =

Sir John Delaval (died 1652) was an English landowner and politician who sat in the House of Commons in 1626.

Delaval was the son of Sir Robert Delaval. He had a grant of North Dissington from his father and purchased South Dissington in 1610. In 1610 he was High Sheriff of Northumberland. He was knighted at Newcastle on 4 May 1617. He became town clerk of Newcastle in 1623 and was Sheriff of Northumberland again in 1624. In 1626, he was elected Member of Parliament for Northumberland. He served a third term as Sheriff of Northumberland in 1634.

Delaval died in 1652 and was buried in Newburn Church.

Parliament of England
Preceded by Sir John Fenwick; Sir Francis Brandling	Member of Parliament for Northumberland; 1626; With: Sir John Fenwick	Succeeded by Sir John Fenwick; Sir William Carnaby
