= Scurfield =

Scurfield is a surname. Notable people with the surname include:

- Elizabeth Clare Scurfield (b. 1950): English author of the Teach Yourself Chinese series
- George Bazeley Scurfield (1920–1991): English author, poet, and politician
- Gordon Scurfield (1924–1996): English biologist and author, with expertise in botany and ecology
- Hugh Hedley Scurfield (b. 1935): English actuary; president of Institute of Actuaries
- John Scurfield (1951–2009): Canadian judge
- Matt Scurfield (b. 1976): American rock drummer
- Matthew Scurfield (b. 1948): English film, television and theatre actor
- Ralph D. Scurfield (b. 1956): Canadian businessman
- Ralph M. Scurfield (b. 1928): American businessman and chairman of the California Horse Racing Board
- Ralph Thomas Scurfield (1928–1985): Canadian businessman, co-owner of the Calgary Flames from 1980 to 1985
- Raymond M. Scurfield (b. 1943): American author and expert in war-related trauma
- Sergei Scurfield (b. 1962): Canadian businessman and lawyer
- Sonia Scurfield (1928–2018): Canadian businesswoman, co-owner of the Calgary Flames from 1985 to 1994
