= Pallinsburn House =

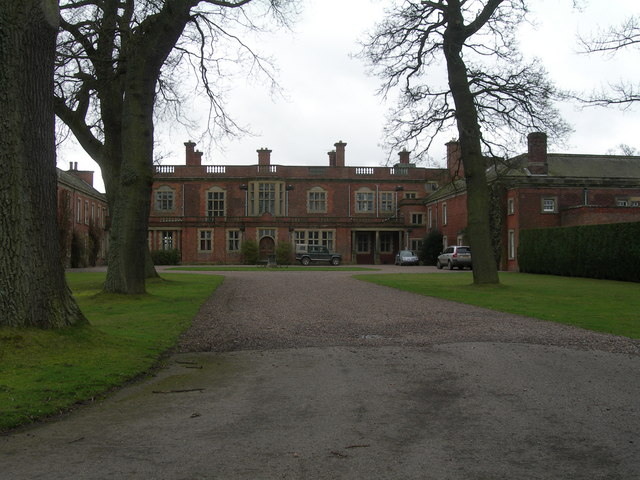

- Location in Northumberland

General information
- Location: Northumberland, England, UK
- Coordinates: 55.646°N 2.165°W
- OS grid: NT897391

Pallinsburn House is an 18th-century country house situated at Crookham, Northumberland. It is a Grade II* listed building.

The house was built about 1763, in a Jacobean style originally with a three-storey frontage, for John Askew, (High Sheriff of Northumberland in 1776), a younger son of Dr Adam Askew of Storrs Hall. The Askew family occupied the house until it was sold in 1911 to Major Charles Mitchell DSO, the grandson of the wealthy Tyneside shipbuilder, Charles Mitchell. Over the years, Major Mitchell carried out extensive improvements and alterations. In 1933 work was begun to remove the third storey of the central block. While this work was carried out, The Mitchells moved to Morris Hall, Norham. The house was sold in 2005 together with 1,500 acres (6.1 km^{2}) for £6.5 million. The contents were sold at auction the following year and realised £840,000.

The name of the small river, burn in Scots, is said to derive from Saint Paulinus baptising people of the region.
