= Clennell Hall =

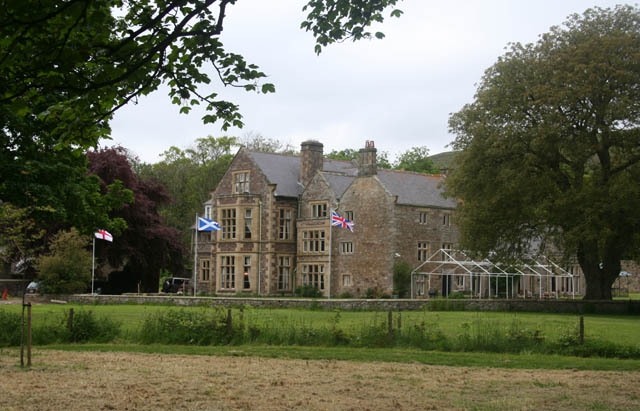
- Clennell Hall

- Location in Northumberland

General information
- Location: Northumberland, England, UK
- Coordinates: 55.35831°N 2.11354°W
- OS grid: NT92900715

Clennell Hall is an historic manor house, now operated as a country hotel, situated at Clennell, near Alwinton, Northumberland, England. It is a Grade II listed building.

The Clennell family held the manor of Clennell from the 13th century.

In a survey of 1541 the tower house at Clennell was described as 'a little tower of Percival Clennell' then newly repaired with a barmkin under construction. In 1715 it was the seat of Luke Clennell, (High Sheriff of Northumberland in 1727) and comprised an old tower on the east, a double wing at the west and a small court to the south with a 'handsome gateway'.

In 1749 Philadelphia Clennell, the heiress of the estate married William Wilkinson, (High Sheriff in 1758). In 1895 their great grandson Anthony Wilkinson greatly extended the property by the addition of a large Tudor style mansion. The present building incorporates a pele tower of 1589, much altered.
