= Hedgeley Hall =

Country house in Northumberland, England

Coordinates: 55°26′54″N 1°53′14″W

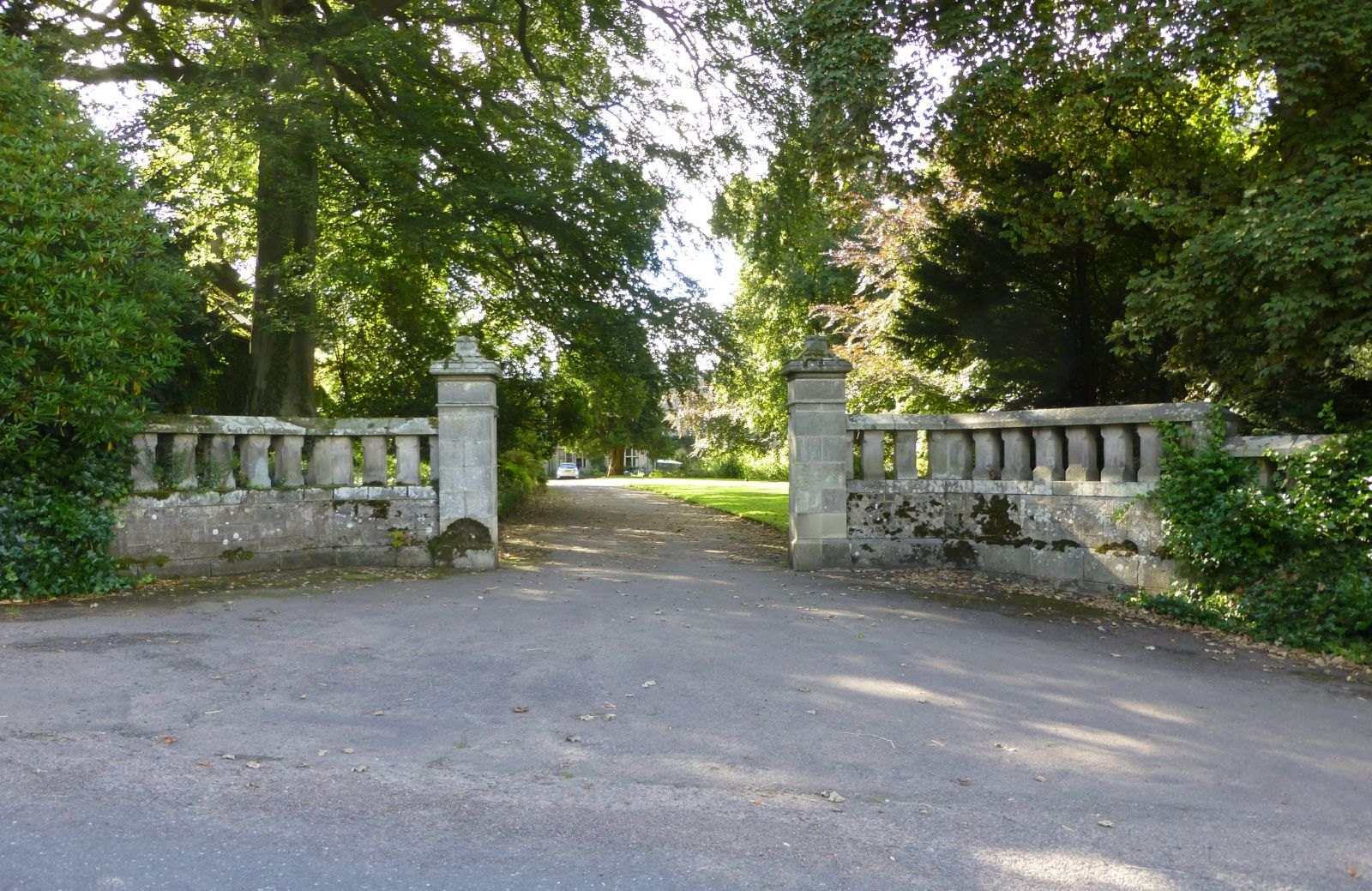
Gateway to Hedgeley Hall

Hedgeley Hall is a privately owned late 18th-century country house situated near Powburn, Northumberland, 8 miles (13 km) northwest of Alnwick. It is a Grade II listed building.

Hedgeley Hall lies in the former parish of Hedgeley. In January 1463/4, during the War of the Roses, Sir Ralph Percy was slain there in a skirmish between the Lancastrians and Yorkists on Hedgeley Moor.

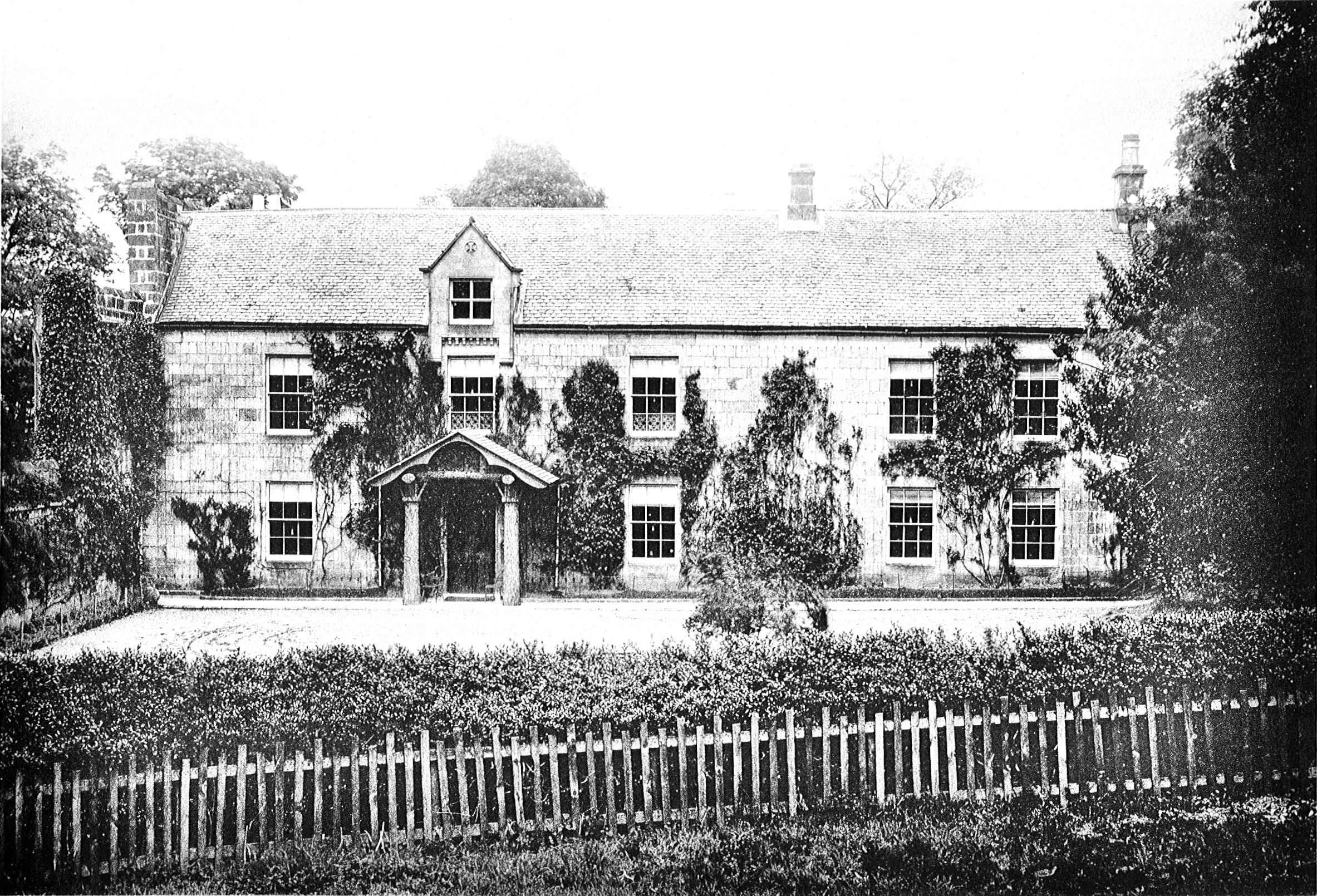
Photo of Hedgeley Hall in the 18th and 19th centuries, the garden side

The estate at Hedgeley was purchased by Ralph Carr in 1786 and he substantially rebuilt the earlier house which had stood on the site.

Ralph's son, John Carr of Hedgeley and Dunston Hill, Gateshead, who was High Sheriff of Northumberland in 1813, married Hannah Ellison, sister of Cuthbert Ellison of Hebburn Hall. Their son Ralph Carr (High Sheriff in 1845) inherited the Hebburn estates from his cousin, Colonel Cuthbert Ellison, in 1870. In 1871, complying with a request from the colonel, he was granted royal permission to add the name Ellison to his own surname.

Hedgeley Hall was remodelled in the 19th century when rear wings were added, and was significantly extended and improved by Colonel Ralph Henry Carr-Ellison with the assistance of architect George Reavell between 1910 and 1914. The interior was enhanced by the transfer of doors and fireplaces from Dunston Hill and Hebburn Hall.

The house and working estate remain in the ownership of the Carr-Ellison family.
