= Bavington Hall =

Seventeenth-century country house at Little Bavington in Northumberland

Coordinates: 55.104960°N 2.015330°W

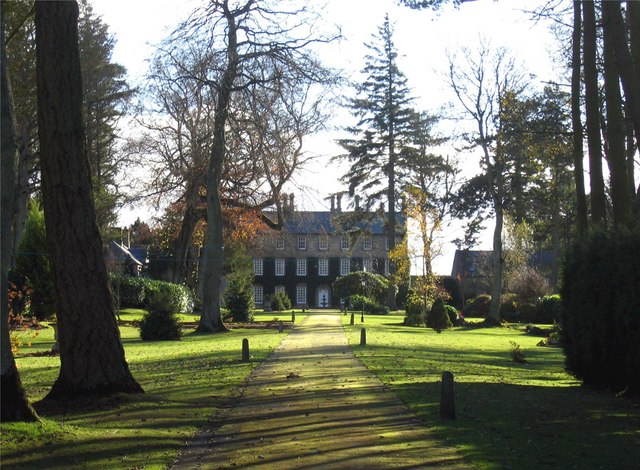
Bavington Hall

Bavington Hall is a 17th-century privately owned country house at Little Bavington in Northumberland. It is a Grade II* listed building.

A tower house (Little Bavington Tower) was recorded on the site in 1415, but this was replaced in the late 17th century by the Shafto family.

The Shaftos acquired the estate when William Shafto married the Bavington heiress in the 15th century. In 1716 William Shafto and his son John were attainted for their part in the Jacobite rising of 1715 and the estate was forfeited and sold by the Crown to Admiral George Delaval. On his death Delaval restored the property to the Shafto family by bequeathing the estate to his brother-in-law George Delaval Shafto (High Sheriff of Northumberland 1739 and Member of Parliament for Northumberland 1757–74).

Significant alterations and improvements to the three-storey, seven-bayed house were carried out in 1720, 1851 and 1930.

The Shafto family sold the property in 1994. The present owners offer holiday accommodation in cottages in the grounds. The grounds contain a grotto, statues and other features which are Grade II listed.
