= Dissington Hall =

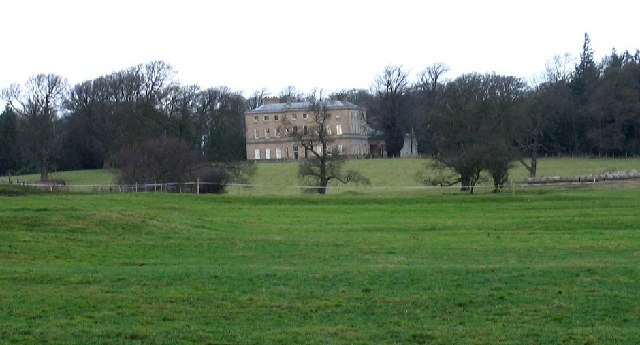

- Location in Northumberland

General information
- Location: Northumberland, England, UK
- Coordinates: 55.039°N 1.817°W
- OS grid: NZ117716

Dissington Hall is an English country house situated on the banks of the River Pont at North Dissington, Ponteland, Northumberland, England. It is a Grade II* listed building. The manor of North Dissington was for centuries the seat of the Delaval family. An earlier house on the site was the birthplace of Admiral Ralph Delaval (c.1641–c.1707) and of Admiral George Delaval (c. 1667–1723) who built Seaton Delaval Hall.

Admiral Ralph Delaval sold the property in 1673 to Edward Collingwood of Byker. In 1794 a later Edward Collingwood (1734–1806), a barrister and coal mine owner of Chirton, Northumberland commissioned architect William Newton to build a new mansion house on the site. Construction was completed by 1797. When he died without children he bequeathed the estate to a nephew, Edward Spencer-Stanhope, on condition that he change his name to Collingwood. The Collingwood family owned the property until 1955, although it was mainly let out to tenants after 1867. During the Second World War it was used as a dormitory, a hospital and a TNT storage depot. In 1940 it was struck by a bomb which caused damage to the east and south elevations.

The property was improved about 1820 when a Tuscan porch was added. The stable block is separately scheduled as a Grade II listed building The Hall was bought by its present owners as a restoration project in 1968. As from January 2016, business owners Michael and Gill Brown, who founded Dissington Hall conference and wedding business back in 1992, have decided to withdraw from the wedding market.
