= Grade II* listed buildings in Northumberland =

Northumberland shown within England

There are over 20,000 Grade II* listed buildings in England. This page is a list of these buildings in the county of Northumberland.

== List ==
Name	Location	Type	Completed (Note: The date given is the date used by Historic England as significant for the initial building or that of an important part in the structure's description.)	Date designated	Grid ref. (Note: The grid reference is based on the British national grid reference system, sometimes known as OSGB36, used by the Ordnance Survey.) Geo-coordinates	Entry number (Note: The "List Entry Number" is a unique number assigned to each listed building and scheduled monument by Historic England.)	Image
Brainshaugh	Brainshaugh, Acklington, Northumberland	House	Late 16th century or early 17th century	31 December 1969	NU2026203127; 55°19′18″N 1°40′56″W	1153504	Upload Photo
Ruins of Church or Chapel	Brainshaugh, Acklington, Northumberland	Wall	18th century	3 December 1969	NU2083703136; 55°19′19″N 1°40′23″W	1153531	Ruins of Church or Chapel More images
Church of St. John of Beverley	Acomb, Northumberland	Church	Roman	15 April 1969	NY9331165715; 54°59′10″N 2°06′22″W	1044822	Church of St. John of Beverley More images
Hexham Bridge	Acomb, Northumberland	Bridge	1793	2 October 1951	NY9406964679; 54°58′36″N 2°05′39″W	1042629	Hexham Bridge More images
Adderstone Hall	Adderstone, Adderstone with Lucker, Northumberland	House	1819	22 December 1969	NU1417530354; 55°34′00″N 1°46′36″W	1370965	Adderstone Hall More images
Akeld Bastle and attached Walling to South	Akeld, Northumberland	Bastle	Late Medieval	14 May 1986	NT9576729408; 55°33′30″N 2°04′07″W	1042370	Akeld Bastle and attached Walling to South More images
Tower House	Alnham, Northumberland	House	1986	21 October 1953	NT9902610984; 55°23′34″N 2°01′01″W	1232573	Tower House More images
Bondgate Hall	Alnwick, Northumberland	Villa	1810	25 August 1977	NU1894713058; 55°24′40″N 1°42′08″W	1302989	Bondgate Hall
Camphill Column	Alnwick, Northumberland	Column	1814	25 August 1977	NU1813812363; 55°24′18″N 1°42′54″W	1041409	Camphill Column More images
Church of St Paul	Alnwick, Northumberland	Church	1845-46	20 February 1952	NU1869013057; 55°24′40″N 1°42′23″W	1041438	Church of St Paul More images
Dorothy Foster's House	Alnwick, Northumberland	House	Early 18th century	20 February 1952	NU1852213511; 55°24′55″N 1°42′32″W	1371371	Dorothy Foster's House More images
General Lambert's House	Alnwick, Northumberland	House	Early 19th century	25 August 1977	NU1851813495; 55°24′54″N 1°42′33″W	1041425	General Lambert's House More images
Pottergate Tower	Alnwick, Northumberland	Tower	1768	20 February 1952	NU1840513485; 55°24′54″N 1°42′39″W	1041444	Pottergate Tower More images
St Marys Chantry (ruins)	Alnwick, Northumberland	Church	c. 1448	20 February 1952	NU1847613783; 55°25′03″N 1°42′35″W	1041415	St Marys Chantry (ruins)
St Michael's Pant	Alnwick, Northumberland	Drinking Fountain	1765	20 February 1952	NU1861813258; 55°24′46″N 1°42′27″W	1041464	St Michael's Pant More images
Territorial Drill Hall	Alnwick, Northumberland	Drill Hall	Early 19th century	25 August 1977	NU1857613361; 55°24′50″N 1°42′29″W	1156885	Territorial Drill Hall More images
The Old Post Office	Alnwick, Northumberland	House	Early 19th century	25 August 1977	NU1859013233; 55°24′46″N 1°42′29″W	1041494	The Old Post Office More images
4 and 5 Percy Street	Alnwick, Northumberland	Kitchen	1831	20 February 1952	NU1861713078; 55°24′41″N 1°42′27″W	1041437	4 and 5 Percy Street More images
2 Bailiffgate	Alnwick, Northumberland	School	1797	20 February 1952	NU1857813593; 55°24′57″N 1°42′29″W	1041547	2 Bailiffgate More images
1 Bailiffgate	Alnwick, Northumberland	House	Early 18th century	20 February 1952	NU1853013537; 55°24′55″N 1°42′32″W	1371332	1 Bailiffgate More images
Church of St Michael	Low Alwinton, Alwinton, Northumberland	Parish Church	12th century	21 October 1953	NT9240105777; 55°20′45″N 2°07′17″W	1041296	Church of St Michael More images
Church of St Anne	Ancroft, Northumberland	Church	18th century	22 December 1969	NU0022645177; 55°42′00″N 1°59′53″W	1042234	Church of St Anne More images
Eastern Winding House and Shaft Head Building (winder and Shaft No 1)	Woodhorn Colliery, Ashington, Northumberland	Mine Shaft	1894-1901	22 May 1986	NZ2893588429; 55°11′21″N 1°32′49″W	1153123	Eastern Winding House and Shaft Head Building (winder and Shaft No 1)
Engine House Between Shafts 1 and 2	Woodhorn Colliery, Ashington, Northumberland	Colliery	c. 1900	22 May 1986	NZ2891288399; 55°11′21″N 1°32′51″W	1304432	Engine House Between Shafts 1 and 2
Fan House to West of Shaft No 2	Woodhorn Colliery, Ashington, Northumberland	Machinery	1900	22 May 1986	NZ2892188411; 55°11′21″N 1°32′50″W	1041394	Fan House to West of Shaft No 2
Western Winding House and Shaft Head Gear (winder and Shaft No 1)	Woodhorn Colliery, Ashington, Northumberland	Mine Shaft	1894-1901	22 May 1986	NZ2888588426; 55°11′21″N 1°32′52″W	1371394	Western Winding House and Shaft Head Gear (winder and Shaft No 1)
Budle Hall	Budle, Bamburgh, Northumberland	House	c. 1810	22 December 1969	NU1575334995; 55°36′30″N 1°45′05″W	1280158	Budle Hall More images
Dovecote circa 50m south of Armstrong House	Bamburgh, Northumberland	Dovecote	Medieval	22 December 1969	NU1817434827; 55°36′24″N 1°42′47″W	1232923	Dovecote circa 50m south of Armstrong House
Monument to Grace Darling c.30m West of Church of St Aidan	Bamburgh, Northumberland	Churchyard	1842	22 December 1969	NU1778934961; 55°36′29″N 1°43′09″W	1206625	Monument to Grace Darling c.30m West of Church of St Aidan More images
Barn 20m North of High Meadow House	Bardon Mill, Northumberland	Barn	18th century	12 February 1985	NY8025365363; 54°58′57″N 2°18′36″W	1042526	Upload Photo
Ridley Bridge	Ridley, Bardon Mill, Northumberland	Wall	1788-1791	24 November 1967	NY7971064716; 54°58′36″N 2°19′07″W	1042496	Ridley Bridge More images
Willimontswick Farmhouse	Willimontswick, Bardon Mill, Northumberland	Hall House	16th century	24 November 1967	NY7706463582; 54°57′59″N 2°21′35″W	1042497	Willimontswick Farmhouse More images
Bavington Hall	Bavington, Northumberland	Country House	Late 17th century	5 September 1985	NY9918478743; 55°06′11″N 2°00′52″W	1044929	Bavington Hall More images
Church of St Aidan	Thockrington, Bavington, Northumberland	Bell Tower	17th century	5 September 1985	NY9572578946; 55°06′18″N 2°04′07″W	1370466	Church of St Aidan More images
Beadnell Hall	Beadnell, Northumberland	Apartment	1969	22 December 1969	NU2310129375; 55°33′27″N 1°38′07″W	1233051	Beadnell Hall More images
The Craster Arms	Beadnell, Northumberland	Tower House	Medieval	22 December 1969	NU2292429272; 55°33′24″N 1°38′17″W	1276787	The Craster Arms More images
Hesleyside Hall	Hesleyside, Bellingham, Northumberland	Country House	1719	10 November 1951	NY8162883738; 55°08′52″N 2°17′23″W	1044997	Hesleyside Hall More images
Hole Bastle, 20 Yards North of Hole Farmhouse	Hole, Bellingham, Northumberland	Bastle	16th century	7 March 1985	NY8670584664; 55°09′22″N 2°12′37″W	1044998	Hole Bastle, 20 Yards North of Hole Farmhouse More images
Lee Hall	Lee Hall, Bellingham, Northumberland	House	17th century	10 November 1951	NY8616279762; 55°06′43″N 2°13′06″W	1044999	Lee Hall More images
Harnham Hall	Harnham, Belsay, Northumberland	House	16th century or Early 17th century	27 August 1952	NZ0737880474; 55°07′07″N 1°53′09″W	1042818	Harnham Hall More images
Stable Block c.30m North-east of Belsay Hall	Belsay, Belsay, Northumberland	House	1810-1817	22 August 1986	NZ0888578434; 55°06′01″N 1°51′44″W	1153036	Stable Block c.30m North-east of Belsay Hall More images
Edina House	Berwick-upon-Tweed, Northumberland	House	18th century	1 August 1952	NT9987952582; 55°46′00″N 2°00′13″W	1042439	Edina House
Entrance Gateway to Military Hospital	Berwick-upon-Tweed, Northumberland	Gate		26 May 1971	NU0008753002; 55°46′13″N 2°00′01″W	1042402	Entrance Gateway to Military Hospital
Garfield Guest House	Berwick-upon-Tweed, Northumberland	House	1849	1 August 1952	NT9963753106; 55°46′17″N 2°00′26″W	1041675	Garfield Guest House
Grammar School	Berwick-upon-Tweed, Northumberland	Grammar School	1754	1 August 1952	NU0003452649; 55°46′02″N 2°00′04″W	1042428	Grammar School
Military Hospital	Berwick-upon-Tweed, Northumberland	Hospital	18th century	26 May 1971	NU0006952992; 55°46′13″N 2°00′02″W	1042446	Military Hospital
Red Lion Public House	Berwick-upon-Tweed, Northumberland	Public House		1 August 1952	NT9959753148; 55°46′18″N 2°00′29″W	1371254	Red Lion Public House More images
Royal Tweed Bridge	Berwick-upon-Tweed, Northumberland	Road Bridge	1925-1928	8 December 2009	NT9952552795; 55°46′07″N 2°00′33″W	1393563	Royal Tweed Bridge More images
The Governor's House	Berwick-upon-Tweed, Northumberland	House	c. 1719	1 August 1952	NT9998852566; 55°45′59″N 2°00′06″W	1370859	The Governor's House More images
The Lions House	Berwick-upon-Tweed, Northumberland	House	18th century	26 May 1971	NU0014452863; 55°46′09″N 1°59′57″W	1371224	The Lions House More images
The Magazine, Including Enclosing Wall and Entrance to the Magazine	Berwick-upon-Tweed, Northumberland	Wall	Early 18th century	26 May 1971	NU0017652879; 55°46′09″N 1°59′56″W	1041697	The Magazine, Including Enclosing Wall and Entrance to the Magazine More images
The Old Guardhouse	Berwick-upon-Tweed, Northumberland	Prison	18th century	26 May 1971	NT9988752544; 55°45′58″N 2°00′12″W	1042425	The Old Guardhouse More images
Wallace Green Manse	Berwick-upon-Tweed, Northumberland	House	Early 19th century	1 August 1952	NT9993152512; 55°45′57″N 2°00′10″W	1233679	Wallace Green Manse More images
4 Main Street	Tweedmouth, Berwick-upon-Tweed, Northumberland	House	18th century	1 August 1952	NT9940652649; 55°46′02″N 2°00′40″W	1042461	4 Main Street More images
4 Quay Walls	Berwick-upon-Tweed, Northumberland	House	Late 18th century	1 August 1952	NT9977152749; 55°46′05″N 2°00′19″W	1042433	4 Quay Walls
5 Quay Walls	Berwick-upon-Tweed, Northumberland	House	18th century	1 August 1952	NT9977552738; 55°46′05″N 2°00′19″W	1290009	5 Quay Walls
19 Quay Walls	Berwick-upon-Tweed, Northumberland	House	Late 18th century	1 August 1952	NT9988352612; 55°46′01″N 2°00′12″W	1290012	19 Quay Walls
20 Quay Walls	Berwick-upon-Tweed, Northumberland	House	Late 18th century	1 August 1952	NT9988452605; 55°46′00″N 2°00′12″W	1042438	20 Quay Walls
2 and 4 Ravensdowne	Berwick-upon-Tweed, Northumberland	House	Early 19th century	1 August 1952	NU0006552694; 55°46′03″N 2°00′02″W	1370875	2 and 4 Ravensdowne
33 and 37 Ravensdowne	Berwick-upon-Tweed, Northumberland	House	18th century	1 August 1952	NU0006552858; 55°46′09″N 2°00′02″W	1211503	Upload Photo
52 and 54 Ravensdowne	Berwick-upon-Tweed, Northumberland	House	Late 18th century	1 August 1952	NU0011552884; 55°46′09″N 1°59′59″W	1211541	Upload Photo
1 Wellington Terrace	Berwick-upon-Tweed, Northumberland	House	Early 19th century	1 August 1952	NT9989952521; 55°45′58″N 2°00′11″W	1276502	1 Wellington Terrace More images
2 Wellington Terrace	Berwick-upon-Tweed, Northumberland	House	Early 19th century	1 August 1952	NT9991252517; 55°45′58″N 2°00′11″W	1233749	2 Wellington Terrace
Biddlestone Roman Catholic Chapel	Biddlestone, Northumberland	Private Chapel	Early 19th century	31 July 1986	NT9553208312; 55°22′08″N 2°04′19″W	1041304	Biddlestone Roman Catholic Chapel More images
Church of St Giles	Birtley Village, Birtley, Northumberland	Parish Church	12th century	10 November 1951	NY8780277962; 55°05′45″N 2°11′34″W	1370467	Church of St Giles More images
Lord Crewe Arms (formerly Blanchland Abbey)	Blanchland, Northumberland	Abbey	13th century	18 June 1986	NY9659550365; 54°50′53″N 2°03′16″W	1154141	Lord Crewe Arms (formerly Blanchland Abbey) More images
Church of St Cuthbert	Blyth, Northumberland	Parish Church	1884-93	28 July 1950	NZ3178281469; 55°07′36″N 1°30′11″W	1041345	Church of St Cuthbert More images
Brinkheugh Farmhouse and Outbuilding to East	Brinkheugh, Brinkburn, Northumberland	House	16th century or early 17th century	21 October 1953	NZ1210498450; 55°16′48″N 1°48′40″W	1041906	Brinkheugh Farmhouse and Outbuilding to East More images
The Manor House	Brinkburn Priory, Brinkburn, Northumberland	House	1810	21 October 1953	NZ1157398302; 55°16′43″N 1°49′10″W	1303922	The Manor House More images
Bywell Hall	Bywell, Northumberland	Villa	1766	20 October 1952	NZ0469461470; 54°56′52″N 1°55′42″W	1370556	Bywell Hall More images
Gatepiers at West Lodge to Capheaton Hall	Capheaton, Northumberland	Gate Pier	1668	28 April 1969	NZ0360280382; 55°07′04″N 1°56′42″W	1370675	Gatepiers at West Lodge to Capheaton Hall More images
Kirkheaton Manor	Kirkheaton, Capheaton, Northumberland	Bastle	16th century	27 August 1952	NZ0183277370; 55°05′27″N 1°58′22″W	1154574	Kirkheaton Manor More images
The Castle of Wark on Tweed	Wark on Tweed, Carham, Northumberland	Motte and Bailey	Early 12th century	21 September 1951	NT8234138702; 55°38′30″N 2°16′56″W	1153601	The Castle of Wark on Tweed More images
Fowberry Tower	Fowberry, Chatton, Northumberland	Country House	1666	21 September 1951	NU0393929340; 55°33′28″N 1°56′21″W	1370883	Fowberry Tower More images
Hetton Hall	Chatton, Northumberland	House	18th century	25 January 1985	NU0405933420; 55°35′40″N 1°56′14″W	1277031	Upload Photo
Hetton House	Chatton, Northumberland	House	Mid 18th century	21 September 1951	NU0419329573; 55°33′35″N 1°56′06″W	1042415	Hetton House
Hepburn Bastle	Hepburn, Chillingham, Northumberland	Tower House	15th century	25 January 1985	NU0708124881; 55°31′03″N 1°53′22″W	1232898	Hepburn Bastle More images
Farmbuilding circa 50m East of Chollerton Farmhouse	Chollerton, Northumberland	Windmill	18th century	5 September 1985	NY9333072020; 55°02′34″N 2°06′21″W	1044901	Farmbuilding circa 50m East of Chollerton Farmhouse More images
Gateway, Lodges and Walls at Entrance to Swinburne Castle	Chollerton, Northumberland	Gate	Late 18th century	5 September 1985	NY9357073478; 55°03′21″N 2°06′08″W	1044936	Upload Photo
Stable Block to East of Swinburne Castle	Great Swinburne, Chollerton, Northumberland	Farm Building	Late 18th century	5 September 1985	NY9350675350; 55°04′21″N 2°06′12″W	1155340	Stable Block to East of Swinburne Castle
Swinburne Castle and Attached Stable	Great Swinburne, Chollerton, Northumberland	House	Early 17th century	20 October 1952	NY9344275354; 55°04′21″N 2°06′15″W	1044905	Swinburne Castle and Attached Stable More images
Coanwood Friends Meeting House at NY 710589	East Coanwood, Coanwood, Northumberland	Friends Meeting House	1760	24 November 1967	NY7099358940; 54°55′27″N 2°27′15″W	1042914	Coanwood Friends Meeting House at NY 710589 More images
Railway Viaduct across River South Tyne	Lambley, Coanwood, Northumberland	Railway Viaduct	1852	23 August 1985	NY6749258363; 54°55′08″N 2°30′31″W	1042918	Railway Viaduct across River South Tyne More images
Walkers Pottery West Bottle Kiln	Corbridge, Northumberland	Bottle Kiln	Early 19th century	15 April 1969	NY9922365218; 54°58′54″N 2°00′49″W	1370576	Walkers Pottery West Bottle Kiln More images
Walkers Pottery: East Bottle Kiln	Corbridge, Northumberland	Bottle Kiln	Early 19th century	15 April 1969	NY9925465223; 54°58′54″N 2°00′47″W	1155212	Walkers Pottery: East Bottle Kiln More images
Coldstream Bridge (that part in England)	Cornhill-on-Tweed, Northumberland	Road bridge	1763-66	6 May 1952	NT8488040122; 55°39′16″N 2°14′31″W	1153712	Coldstream Bridge (that part in England) More images
Cornhill House	Cornhill-on-Tweed, Northumberland	House	Late 16th century or Early 17th century	10 March 1988	NT8555739246; 55°38′48″N 2°13′52″W	1153748	Cornhill House
Remains of Heaton Castle Circa 30 Yards North West of Farmhouse	Castle Heaton, Cornhill-on-Tweed, Northumberland	Castle	Late Medieval	22 December 1969	NT9011341916; 55°40′14″N 2°09′32″W	1304159	Remains of Heaton Castle Circa 30 Yards North West of Farmhouse More images
Craster Tower	Craster Tower, Craster, Northumberland	Country House	1769	10 January 1953	NU2511719568; 55°28′09″N 1°36′15″W	1041813	Upload Photo
Dunstan Hall	Dunstan, Craster, Northumberland	House	Pre Early 14th century	1 September 1988	NU2482220114; 55°28′27″N 1°36′32″W	1041815	Dunstan Hall More images
Cresswell Tower	Cresswell, Cresswell, Northumberland	Tower House	Medieval	20 October 1969	NZ2936593356; 55°14′01″N 1°32′23″W	1042148	Cresswell Tower More images
Hulne Friary Infirmary	Hulne Park, Denwick, Northumberland	House	Late 18th century	31 December 1969	NU1636515677; 55°26′05″N 1°44′35″W	1042011	Hulne Friary Infirmary
Iron Bridge over River Aln	Hulne Park, Denwick, Northumberland	Bridge	1812	25 August 1987	NU1626915259; 55°25′51″N 1°44′40″W	1042013	Iron Bridge over River Aln More images
Doddington Bastle	Doddington, Northumberland	Bastle	1584	15 May 1986	NT9981232503; 55°35′10″N 2°00′16″W	1303459	Upload Photo
Twizell Castle	Duddo, Northumberland	House	c. 1770	22 December 1969	NT8829843407; 55°41′02″N 2°11′16″W	1042168	Twizell Castle More images
Column 410m South East of Lemmington Hall	Lemmington Hall, Edlingham, Northumberland	Column	1786	31 December 1969	NU1238810964; 55°23′33″N 1°48′22″W	1371077	Column 410m South East of Lemmington Hall More images
Lemmington Hall (Sacred Heart Convent)	Lemmington Hall, Edlingham, Northumberland	Country House	c. 1750	31 December 1969	NU1210311278; 55°23′43″N 1°48′38″W	1041996	Lemmington Hall (Sacred Heart Convent) More images
Charlton Hall	Eglingham, Northumberland	Country House	Late 18th century	25 August 1987	NU1789822373; 55°29′41″N 1°43′06″W	1042002	Charlton Hall More images
Church of St Maurice	Eglingham Village, Eglingham, Northumberland	Parish Church	Medieval	31 December 1969	NU1061619463; 55°28′08″N 1°50′01″W	1041975	Church of St Maurice More images
Eglingham Hall	Eglingham Hall, Eglingham, Northumberland	Country House	16th century or 17th century	10 January 1953	NU1042419540; 55°28′10″N 1°50′12″W	1041971	Eglingham Hall More images
Preston Tower (old)	Preston, Ellingham, Northumberland	Hall House	14th century	22 December 1969	NU1837125432; 55°31′20″N 1°42′38″W	1034424	Preston Tower (old) More images
Dovecote at Rear of Number 4	Embleton, Northumberland	Dovecote	Medieval	31 December 1969	NU2332722317; 55°29′39″N 1°37′56″W	1041790	Dovecote at Rear of Number 4 More images
Featherstone Bridge	Featherstone, Northumberland	Road Bridge	c. 1775	10 June 1952	NY6757161896; 54°57′02″N 2°30′28″W	1045293	Featherstone Bridge More images
Acton House and House at Rear	Acton, Felton, Northumberland	House	Early 18th century	31 December 1969	NU1906402760; 55°19′07″N 1°42′04″W	1041872	Acton House and House at Rear More images
Greenhouse 120m East of Felton Park with Potting Shed at Rear	Felton Park, Felton, Northumberland	Garden Wall	18th century	31 December 1969	NU1804800166; 55°17′43″N 1°43′02″W	1154561	Upload Photo
Old Felton Bridge over River Coquet	Felton, Northumberland	Bridge	15th century	31 December 1969	NU1851300296; 55°17′47″N 1°42′36″W	1041879	Old Felton Bridge over River Coquet More images
Church of St Michael and All Angels	Ford, Ford, Northumberland	Parish Church	13th century	21 September 1951	NT9446637402; 55°37′49″N 2°05′22″W	1371006	Church of St Michael and All Angels More images
Etal Manor	Etal, Ford, Northumberland	Country House	1748	21 September 1951	NT9297239452; 55°38′55″N 2°06′48″W	1153945	Etal Manor More images
Ford Castle East Gateway, East Forecourt Wall and Handyman's Cottage	Ford, Northumberland	Workers Cottage	c. 1862	10 March 1988	NT9448437536; 55°37′53″N 2°05′21″W	1154087	Upload Photo
Ford Castle North Forecourt Wall and Gateway with Laundry and Service Wing Attached to Rear	Ford Castle, Ford, Northumberland	Castle	1791	10 March 1988	NT9444837541; 55°37′53″N 2°05′23″W	1042186	Upload Photo
Lady Waterford Hall	Ford, Ford, Northumberland	School	1860	10 March 1988	NT9471337597; 55°37′55″N 2°05′08″W	1042153	Lady Waterford Hall More images
Pallinsburn House	Pallinsburn, Ford, Northumberland	Country House	Late 18th century or Early 19th century	21 September 1951	NT8978639024; 55°38′41″N 2°09′50″W	1042162	Pallinsburn House More images
Dovecote 40m South West of Glanton House	Glanton Village, Glanton, Northumberland	Dovecote	Late 17th century or Early 18th century	31 December 1969	NU0720314433; 55°25′26″N 1°53′16″W	1371069	Upload Photo
The World Bird Research Station	Glanton Village, Glanton, Northumberland	House	Early 18th century	31 December 1969	NU0706814510; 55°25′28″N 1°53′24″W	1041985	The World Bird Research Station
Red Lion Hotel	Haltwhistle, Northumberland	House	Early-Mid 18th century	10 June 1952	NY7077164109; 54°58′15″N 2°27′29″W	1303038	Red Lion Hotel More images
Woodhouses Bastlehouse	Holystone Grange, Harbottle, Northumberland	Bastle	16th century	21 October 1953	NT9658200288; 55°17′48″N 2°03′19″W	1155771	Woodhouses Bastlehouse More images
Old Schoolhouse	Hartburn, Hartburn, Northumberland	School House	1762	20 October 1969	NZ0887986197; 55°10′12″N 1°51′44″W	1042077	Old Schoolhouse More images
Stable Block at Meldon Park and Wall to South	Meldon Park, Hartburn, Northumberland	Stables	Early 19th century	20 October 1969	NZ1077885540; 55°09′51″N 1°49′57″W	1371038	Upload Photo
Hauxley Hall	High Hauxley, Hauxley, Northumberland	House	1724	10 January 1953	NU2787303106; 55°19′16″N 1°33′44″W	1303591	Hauxley Hall More images
Lighthouse and attached Buildings	Coquet Island, Hauxley, Northumberland	House	Medieval	31 December 1969	NU2930504532; 55°20′02″N 1°32′23″W	1371130	Lighthouse and attached Buildings More images
Church of St Cuthbert	Haydon Bridge, Haydon, Northumberland	Sculpture	17th century	15 April 1969	NY8428064427; 54°58′27″N 2°14′50″W	1154539	Church of St Cuthbert More images
High Staward Farmhouse with Back Yard Walls and Outbuildings Attached	High Staward, Haydon, Northumberland	House	Early 19th century	12 February 1985	NY8063659184; 54°55′37″N 2°18′13″W	1042507	Upload Photo
Main Group of Farm Buildings and Walls to North East of High Staward Farmhouse	High Staward, Haydon, Northumberland	Wall	Early 19th century	12 February 1985	NY8063659217; 54°55′38″N 2°18′13″W	1042508	Upload Photo
Old Coal Mine Buildings South-east of Stublick Farmhouse	Stublick, Haydon, Northumberland	Colliery	Early 19th century	12 February 1985	NY8329860411; 54°56′17″N 2°15′44″W	1370425	Old Coal Mine Buildings South-east of Stublick Farmhouse More images
Pigsties 30m North East of High Staward Farmhouse	High Starward, Haydon, Northumberland	Dovecote	Early 19th century	12 February 1985	NY8064359203; 54°55′38″N 2°18′13″W	1370846	Upload Photo
Smithy and Shelter Sheds 60m North East of High Staward Farmhouse	High Starward, Haydon, Northumberland	Shelter Shed	Early 19th century	12 February 1985	NY8067759229; 54°55′39″N 2°18′11″W	1303736	Upload Photo
Close House	Close House, Heddon-on-the-Wall, Northumberland	Country House	1779	27 August 1969	NZ1271365863; 54°59′14″N 1°48′10″W	1154745	Close House More images
Rudchester	Heddon-on-the-Wall, Northumberland	House	Late 13th century	27 August 1952	NZ1125767367; 55°00′03″N 1°49′32″W	1154705	Rudchester More images
Crawley Tower with Cottage inside	Crawley, Hedgeley, Northumberland	House	18th century	25 August 1987	NU0689116514; 55°26′33″N 1°53′33″W	1057698	Crawley Tower with Cottage inside More images
Percys Cross with enclosing Wall and Railings	Hedgeley, Northumberland	Wall	19th century	31 December 1969	NU0540619267; 55°28′02″N 1°54′58″W	1041952	Percys Cross with enclosing Wall and Railings More images
Shawdon Hall	Shawdon, Hedgeley, Northumberland	Country House	1779	25 August 1987	NU0926814319; 55°25′22″N 1°51′18″W	1038949	Shawdon Hall More images
Barn North-west of Burncliffe	Henshaw, Northumberland	Storehouse	Mid C20	27 July 1987	NY7670964326; 54°58′23″N 2°21′55″W	1045243	Upload Photo
Causeway House and Loose Box adjoining on East	Henshaw, Northumberland	Farmhouse	1770	17 June 1987	NY7628666337; 54°59′28″N 2°22′20″W	1045241	Causeway House and Loose Box adjoining on East More images
Tower House	Henshaw, Northumberland	Bastle	Late 16th century	27 July 1987	NY7674164332; 54°58′23″N 2°21′54″W	1156436	Upload Photo
Hepple Tower	Hepple, Northumberland	Tower	14th century	21 October 1953	NT9865800652; 55°18′00″N 2°01′22″W	1371440	Hepple Tower
Bridge over Halgut Burn in Grounds of Hexham House	Hexham, Northumberland	Bridge	13th century	2 October 1951	NY9341564145; 54°58′19″N 2°06′16″W	1042590	Upload Photo
Church of St Mary (Roman Catholic)	Hexham, Northumberland	Roman Catholic Church	1830	18 May 1976	NY9338663862; 54°58′10″N 2°06′17″W	1042558	Church of St Mary (Roman Catholic) More images
Entrance Gateway to the Henry King Memorial Almshouses	Hexham, Northumberland	Gate	Late 17th century or early 18th century	2 October 1951	NY9374764204; 54°58′21″N 2°05′57″W	1042557	Entrance Gateway to the Henry King Memorial Almshouses
Fandango's Club	Hexham, Northumberland	Club	17th century	18 May 1976	NY9359264007; 54°58′14″N 2°06′06″W	1042554	Fandango's Club
Hexham House	Hexham, Northumberland	House	1723	2 October 1951	NY9345764229; 54°58′21″N 2°06′13″W	1281531	Hexham House More images
High Shield House	Hexham, Northumberland	House	17th century	2 October 1951	NY9349362989; 54°57′41″N 2°06′11″W	1203721	Upload Photo
Holy Island House	Holy Island, Hexham, Northumberland	Cruck House	1657	2 October 1951	NY9334464351; 54°58′25″N 2°06′20″W	1042573	Holy Island House More images
Middle Shield House	Hexham, Northumberland	House	Early-mid 18th century	18 May 1976	NY9353663052; 54°57′43″N 2°06′09″W	1370780	Middle Shield House More images
Northumberland Fusiliers' War Memorial Gateway	Hexham, Northumberland	Gate	Late 17th century or early 18th century	2 October 1951	NY9350164013; 54°58′14″N 2°06′11″W	1281571	Northumberland Fusiliers' War Memorial Gateway More images
Orchard House	Hexham, Northumberland	House	c. 1825	2 October 1951	NY9386263986; 54°58′14″N 2°05′51″W	1370826	Orchard House
Shambles	Hexham, Northumberland	Market Hall	1766	2 October 1951	NY9361364094; 54°58′17″N 2°06′05″W	1370800	Shambles More images
Stable of the Spital	Hexham, Northumberland	Pavilion	c. 1802	18 May 1976	NY9267265074; 54°58′49″N 2°06′58″W	1042516	Stable of the Spital More images
The Old Queen Elizabeth Grammar School	Hexham, Northumberland	Grammar School	1684	2 October 1951	NY9374264053; 54°58′16″N 2°05′57″W	1281643	The Old Queen Elizabeth Grammar School More images
Holy Island Cottage (formerly Toad Hall)	Holy Island, Hexham, Northumberland	House	1737	2 October 1951	NY9334164363; 54°58′26″N 2°06′20″W	1203992	Holy Island Cottage (formerly Toad Hall) More images
19 and 21 Priestpopple	Hexham, Northumberland	House	Early 18th century	2 October 1951	NY9377763935; 54°58′12″N 2°05′55″W	1042547	19 and 21 Priestpopple
31 Market Place	Hexham, Northumberland	House	Late 18th century	2 October 1951	NY9361264134; 54°58′18″N 2°06′05″W	1042539	31 Market Place
24 Market Street	Hexham, Northumberland	House	Late C18/early 19th century	2 October 1951	NY9352764191; 54°58′20″N 2°06′10″W	1281390	24 Market Street
20 and 22 Market Street	Hexham, Northumberland	House	18th century	2 October 1951	NY9353664188; 54°58′20″N 2°06′09″W	1370824	20 and 22 Market Street
19 and 19a St Marys Chare	Hexham, Northumberland	House	Late C17/early 18th century	18 May 1976	NY9359663989; 54°58′14″N 2°06′06″W	1370828	19 and 19a St Marys Chare
22 Market Place	Hexham, Northumberland	House	Early-mid 18th century	18 May 1976	NY9357964139; 54°58′19″N 2°06′07″W	1042536	22 Market Place
27 and 28 Market Place	Hexham, Northumberland	House	1749	2 October 1951	NY9359664144; 54°58′19″N 2°06′06″W	1042538	27 and 28 Market Place
Dotland Park Farmhouse	Dotland Park, Hexhamshire Low Quarter, Northumberland	House	Late 19th century	20 October 1952	NY9313660213; 54°56′12″N 2°06′31″W	1155783	Dotland Park Farmhouse More images
Old Mill 30m South West of Linnels Bridge	Linnels, Hexhamshire Low Quarter, Northumberland	Kiln	c. 1700	20 October 1952	NY9547961626; 54°56′57″N 2°04′20″W	1045330	Old Mill 30m South West of Linnels Bridge More images
Horncliffe House	Horncliffe, Horncliffe, Northumberland	Country House	c. 1800	22 December 1969	NT9334350326; 55°44′47″N 2°06′27″W	1042252	Horncliffe House More images
Welton Hall	Welton, Horsley, Northumberland	Farmhouse	17th century	7 March 1985	NZ0653367598; 55°00′10″N 1°53′58″W	1154306	Welton Hall More images
Chesters	Chesters, Humshaugh, Northumberland	Country House	1771	24 May 1988	NY9092270251; 55°01′36″N 2°08′37″W	1155585	Chesters More images
Chesters Museum	Humshaugh, Northumberland	Museum		24 May 1988	NY9116270425; 55°01′42″N 2°08′23″W	1043022	Chesters Museum More images
Stable Block 200m North of Chesters	Chesters, Humshaugh, Northumberland	Wall	1891	15 April 1969	NY9086570484; 55°01′44″N 2°08′40″W	1370562	Stable Block 200m North of Chesters
Church of St Michael	Ilderton, Ilderton, Northumberland	Parish Church	13th century	21 September 1951	NU0173321851; 55°29′26″N 1°58′27″W	1370929	Church of St Michael More images
Church of St Michael	Ingram, Ingram, Northumberland	Parish Church	11th century	21 September 1951	NU0193616303; 55°26′26″N 1°58′15″W	1276811	Church of St Michael More images
Bloodybush Pillar	Bloodybush, Kielder, Northumberland	Toll Board	1828	7 January 1988	NY5713191026; 55°12′42″N 2°40′31″W	1044859	Bloodybush Pillar More images
Church of St Gregory the Great	Kirknewton, Kirknewton, Northumberland	Parish Church	13th century	21 September 1951	NT9134630251; 55°33′57″N 2°08′20″W	1153604	Church of St Gregory the Great More images
Church of St Bartholomew	Kirkwhelpington Village, Kirkwhelpington, Northumberland	Church	1764	10 November 1951	NY9965384420; 55°09′15″N 2°00′25″W	1044915	Church of St Bartholomew More images
Little Harle Tower	Harle, Kirkwhelpington, Northumberland	House	Medieval	5 September 1985	NZ0137583477; 55°08′44″N 1°58′48″W	1370497	Little Harle Tower
Cross 10m South of Parish Church Door	Kirkhaugh, Knaresdale with Kirkhaugh, Northumberland	Cross	Pre-Conquest	23 August 1985	NY6993449398; 54°50′19″N 2°28′11″W	1155479	Cross 10m South of Parish Church Door
Church of St Mary	Lesbury Village, Lesbury, Northumberland	Church	12th century	31 December 1969	NU2368211705; 55°23′55″N 1°37′39″W	1041795	Church of St Mary More images
Lilburn Tower	Lilburn Tower, Lilburn, Northumberland	Country House	1828-1843	21 September 1951	NU0252624342; 55°30′46″N 1°57′42″W	1233174	Lilburn Tower More images
Observatory c.100m South West of Lilburn Tower	Lilburn Tower, Lilburn, Northumberland	Observatory	c. 1840	25 January 1985	NU0246024251; 55°30′43″N 1°57′45″W	1370892	Upload Photo
Newmoor Hall	Newmoor, Longframlington, Northumberland	House	Medieval	21 October 1953	NU1433403434; 55°19′29″N 1°46′32″W	1041854	Newmoor Hall More images
The Hall	Longhirst, Northumberland	Country House	1824	20 October 1969	NZ2235388983; 55°11′41″N 1°39′01″W	1303132	The Hall More images
Horsley Tower and Adjacent Outbuilding	Longhorsley, Longhorsley, Northumberland	Tower House	Early 16th century	30 January 1986	NZ1462594646; 55°14′45″N 1°46′17″W	1042097	Horsley Tower and Adjacent Outbuilding More images
Group of 4 Medieval Grave Slabs 7m South of Vestry of Church of St Michael	Howick Hall, Longhoughton, Northumberland	Grave Slab	Medieval	1 September 1988	NU2486617384; 55°26′59″N 1°36′30″W	1041767	Upload Photo
Howick Hall Centre Block and Link Galleries	Howick Hall, Longhoughton, Northumberland	Kitchen	1782	1 September 1988	NU2480217499; 55°27′03″N 1°36′34″W	1153968	Howick Hall Centre Block and Link Galleries
Howick Hall West Wing	Howick Hall, Longhoughton, Northumberland	Kitchen	Late C20	1 September 1988	NU2474417527; 55°27′04″N 1°36′37″W	1041803	Howick Hall West Wing
Main Limekiln to East of the Limery	Little Mill, Longhoughton, Northumberland	Lime Kiln	Early 19th century	1 September 1988	NU2284417453; 55°27′01″N 1°38′25″W	1041773	Upload Photo
Stableyard Buildings at East End of Howick Hall	Howick Hall, Longhoughton, Northumberland	Yard	1782	1 September 1988	NU2483017553; 55°27′04″N 1°36′32″W	1153996	Stableyard Buildings at East End of Howick Hall
Barmoor Castle	Barmoor, Lowick, Northumberland	Country House	19th century	15 May 1986	NT9973639879; 55°39′09″N 2°00′21″W	1156023	Barmoor Castle More images
Pithead Baths at Lynemouth Colliery Including Offices and Canteen (now the Medical Wing)	Lynemouth, Northumberland	Pithead Baths	1938	18 December 1985	NZ2976190452; 55°12′27″N 1°32′02″W	1156081	Pithead Baths at Lynemouth Colliery Including Offices and Canteen (now the Medical Wing) More images
Gates, Gatepiers and Screen Walls to West of Matfen Hall	Matfen, Northumberland	Gates	Early 19th century	28 April 1969	NZ0291671520; 55°02′17″N 1°57′21″W	1042787	Gates, Gatepiers and Screen Walls to West of Matfen Hall More images
Matfen Hall	Matfen, Northumberland	Country House	1828-1830	27 August 1952	NZ0315871652; 55°02′22″N 1°57′08″W	1155328	Matfen Hall More images
South Hall	Ingoe, Matfen, Northumberland	House	Early 18th century	27 August 1952	NZ0401074726; 55°04′01″N 1°56′19″W	1042779	South Hall More images
Conservatory adjoining North-east Corner of Meldon Park	Meldon Park, Meldon, Northumberland	Conservatory	Early 19th century	30 January 1986	NZ1080785500; 55°09′49″N 1°49′55″W	1304157	Upload Photo
Meldon Park	Meldon Park, Meldon, Northumberland	Country House	1832	6 May 1952	NZ1077985459; 55°09′48″N 1°49′56″W	1042899	Upload Photo
Mitford Hall and attached Screen Wall	Mitford Hall, Mitford, Northumberland	Country House	c1800-23	6 May 1952	NZ1647685457; 55°09′47″N 1°44′35″W	1042650	Upload Photo
Mitford Hall East Wing and Conservatory	Mitford Hall, Mitford, Northumberland	Country House	c. 1820	29 April 1987	NZ1649885489; 55°09′48″N 1°44′33″W	1370759	Upload Photo
Old Manor House and adjacent Ruins	Mitford, Northumberland	Manor House	1961-2	20 October 1969	NZ1681685573; 55°09′51″N 1°44′15″W	1206539	Old Manor House and adjacent Ruins More images
St James the Great (or Church of St James)	Morpeth, Northumberland	Church	1842-1846	11 August 1950	NZ1980486238; 55°10′12″N 1°41′26″W	1042733	St James the Great (or Church of St James) More images
Collingwood House	Morpeth, Northumberland	House	Late C18-Early 19th century	11 August 1950	NZ1967085978; 55°10′04″N 1°41′34″W	1042740	Collingwood House More images
Entrance Screen to Churchyard of Church of St James	Morpeth, Northumberland	Gate	1842-1846	11 August 1950	NZ1972986199; 55°10′11″N 1°41′31″W	1156013	Entrance Screen to Churchyard of Church of St James
New Bridge (Telford Bridge)	Morpeth, Northumberland	Bridge	1829-1831	11 August 1950	NZ2007585855; 55°10′00″N 1°41′11″W	1303312	New Bridge (Telford Bridge) More images
The Clock Tower	Morpeth, Northumberland	Lock Up	Early 17th century	11 August 1950	NZ1976885952; 55°10′03″N 1°41′28″W	1156135	The Clock Tower More images
The Court House	Morpeth, Northumberland	Apartment	1822	11 August 1950	NZ2014085691; 55°09′54″N 1°41′07″W	1303244	The Court House More images
Church of St Giles	Netherwitton, Netherwitton, Northumberland	Parish Church	12th century	20 October 1969	NZ1016090410; 55°12′28″N 1°50′31″W	1042909	Church of St Giles More images
Newbrough Hall	Newbrough, Northumberland	Country House	1812	20 October 1952	NY8750768258; 55°00′31″N 2°11′49″W	1303465	Newbrough Hall More images
Newton Hall	High Newton by the Sea, Newton-by-the-Sea, Northumberland	Country House	Late 18th century	10 January 1953	NU2318924958; 55°31′04″N 1°38′04″W	1041747	Newton Hall More images
Swarland Old Hall	Swarland, Newton-on-the-Moor and Swarland, Northumberland	House	16th century	15 September 1988	NU1597701928; 55°18′40″N 1°44′59″W	1303268	Swarland Old Hall More images
Chapel of St Cuthbert	Farne Islands, North Sunderland, Northumberland	Chapel	12th century or 13th century	22 December 1969	NU2180835990; 55°37′01″N 1°39′19″W	1276105	Chapel of St Cuthbert More images
West Ord	West Ord, Ord, Northumberland	House	c1700-1710	22 December 1969	NT9544551748; 55°45′33″N 2°04′27″W	1155135	West Ord More images
Gatepiers, Garden Walls, Railings and Sundial, circa 30m South of Overacres	Overacres, Otterburn, Northumberland	Gate Pier	1720	10 November 1951	NY9084793058; 55°13′54″N 2°08′44″W	1156318	Gatepiers, Garden Walls, Railings and Sundial, circa 30m South of Overacres More images
The Old Vicarage	Ovingham, Northumberland	House	15th century	20 October 1952	NZ0850263635; 54°58′02″N 1°52′07″W	1370472	Upload Photo
Church of the Holy Trinity	Whitfield, Plenmeller with Whitfield, Northumberland	Parish Church	1859-60	24 November 1967	NY7792656863; 54°54′22″N 2°20′45″W	1156049	Church of the Holy Trinity More images
Dissington Hall	Dissington, Ponteland, Northumberland	Country House	1794	27 August 1952	NZ1178071742; 55°02′24″N 1°49′02″W	1042708	Dissington Hall More images
Prestwick Hall	Prestwick, Ponteland, Northumberland	House	1815	22 August 1986	NZ1804372424; 55°02′46″N 1°43′09″W	1370741	Upload Photo
The Blackbird Inn	Ponteland, Northumberland	Manor House	Mid 17th century	27 August 1952	NZ1653572993; 55°03′04″N 1°44′34″W	1042690	The Blackbird Inn More images
The Old Rectory	Ponteland, Northumberland	House	Early 18th century	27 August 1952	NZ1653972906; 55°03′01″N 1°44′34″W	1042720	Upload Photo
Church of Saints Philip and James	Rock, Rennington, Northumberland	Bust	Mid 12th century	31 December 1969	NU2021720231; 55°28′32″N 1°40′54″W	1041758	Church of Saints Philip and James More images
Rock Hall	Rock, Rennington, Northumberland	House	13th century	1 September 1988	NU2008220265; 55°28′33″N 1°41′02″W	1154734	Rock Hall More images
Addycombe Cottages with attached Walls and Outbuildings	Addycombe Gardens, Rothbury, Northumberland	Apartment	C20	26 March 1973	NU0594101935; 55°18′41″N 1°54′29″W	1041930	Upload Photo
Burnfoot Power House, 70m North of Burnfoot Lodge	Rothbury, Northumberland	Turbine House	1883-1887	25 August 1987	NU0705001744; 55°18′35″N 1°53′26″W	1042071	Burnfoot Power House, 70m North of Burnfoot Lodge More images
Church of All Saints	Rothbury, Northumberland	Cross	c800	21 October 1953	NU0577201657; 55°18′32″N 1°54′38″W	1371119	Church of All Saints More images
Clock Tower 110m North East of Cragside Park House	Cragside Lodge, Rothbury, Northumberland	Clock Tower	1864	22 December 1981	NU0699902152; 55°18′48″N 1°53′29″W	1354750	Clock Tower 110m North East of Cragside Park House More images
Cragend Farm Hydraulic Silo	Rothbury, Northumberland	Turbine	c. 1895	25 August 1987	NU0870600882; 55°18′07″N 1°51′52″W	1153196	Cragend Farm Hydraulic Silo More images
Debdon Sawmill and attached Wall to South West	Rothbury, Northumberland	Sawmill	Third Quarter of 19th century	25 August 1987	NU0649402812; 55°19′10″N 1°53′57″W	1371031	Upload Photo
The Iron Bridge across the Debdon Burn 80m North West of Cragside	Cragside, Rothbury, Northumberland	Gate	1870s	25 August 1987	NU0727002233; 55°18′51″N 1°53′13″W	1042033	The Iron Bridge across the Debdon Burn 80m North West of Cragside More images
Rothley Castle	Rothley, Northumberland	Wall	c. 1755	29 May 1987	NZ0437588743; 55°11′35″N 1°55′58″W	1371065	Rothley Castle More images
Boundary Wall around Fort House with attached Structures	Hartley, Seaton Valley, Northumberland	Gate	c. 1917	15 July 1987	NZ3417575928; 55°04′36″N 1°27′59″W	1041329	Boundary Wall around Fort House with attached Structures
Fort House	Hartley, Seaton Valley, Northumberland	House	1917	15 July 1987	NZ3422175906; 55°04′35″N 1°27′56″W	1154951	Upload Photo
Mausoleum 500m East of Seaton Delaval Hall	Seaton Delaval Hall, Seaton Valley, Northumberland	Mausoleum	1766	28 July 1950	NZ3282176490; 55°04′54″N 1°29′15″W	1154937	Mausoleum 500m East of Seaton Delaval Hall
Orangery in Walled Garden 300m North East of Seaton Delaval Hall	Seaton Delaval Hall, Seaton Valley, Northumberland	Orangery	Early 18th century	28 July 1950	NZ3242476738; 55°05′03″N 1°29′37″W	1154932	Orangery in Walled Garden 300m North East of Seaton Delaval Hall More images
Outbuilding 60m South West of Fort House	Hartley, Seaton Valley, Northumberland	Wash House	c. 1917	15 July 1987	NZ3415975866; 55°04′34″N 1°28′00″W	1303566	Outbuilding 60m South West of Fort House
Church of St James	Shilbottle, Northumberland	Parish Church	12th century	31 December 1969	NU1959208729; 55°22′20″N 1°41′33″W	1041723	Church of St James More images
Shotley Hall	Shotley Bridge, Shotley Low Quarter, Northumberland	House	1863	18 June 1986	NZ0881452684; 54°52′08″N 1°51′51″W	1156072	Shotley Hall More images
Church of St Mungo	Simonburn, Northumberland	Cross	Saxon	27 July 1987	NY8708773564; 55°03′23″N 2°12′13″W	1157154	Church of St Mungo More images
Nunwick Hall and Ranges around Service Court	Nunwick, Simonburn, Northumberland	Country House	c1745-52	20 October 1952	NY8795774134; 55°03′42″N 2°11′24″W	1302602	Upload Photo
Wing of Medieval House and adjacent later Outbuildings	Shield Hall, Slaley, Northumberland	Manor House	Late C13/early 14th century	15 April 1969	NY9534258701; 54°55′23″N 2°04′27″W	1302809	Upload Photo
Cheeseburn Grange	Cheeseburn Grange, Stamfordham, Northumberland	Country House	1813	27 August 1952	NZ0938571230; 55°02′08″N 1°51′17″W	1370742	Cheeseburn Grange More images
Eachwick Hall	Eachwick, Stamfordham, Northumberland	House	Early 18th century	27 August 1952	NZ1151571153; 55°02′05″N 1°49′17″W	1302251	Eachwick Hall More images
Hawkwell House	Hawkwell, Stamfordham, Northumberland	House	Earlier Core	27 August 1952	NZ0771071770; 55°02′25″N 1°52′51″W	1370732	Hawkwell House More images
Canal with Basin Urns and Statue, to south of Blagdon Hall	Blagdon, Stannington, Northumberland	Statue	1863	19 October 1987	NZ2153876921; 55°05′11″N 1°39′51″W	1247870	Canal with Basin Urns and Statue, to south of Blagdon Hall More images
South Lodges, Gate Screen and Gates to Blagdon Hall	Blagdon, Stannington, Northumberland	House	C20	27 August 1952	NZ2253676290; 55°04′50″N 1°38′55″W	1298582	South Lodges, Gate Screen and Gates to Blagdon Hall More images
Stable Block to north of Blagdon Hall including Archway, Courtyard and Drummonds' Flats	Blagdon, Stannington, Northumberland	Apartment	1791	28 April 1969	NZ2154477086; 55°05′16″N 1°39′50″W	1370782	Upload Photo
Bastle on North Side of Road	Gatehouse, Tarset, Northumberland	Bastle	16th century or early 17th century	7 January 1988	NY7878688982; 55°11′41″N 2°20′05″W	1044839	Upload Photo
Black Middens Bastlehouse circa 800m South-east of Comb	Comb, Tarset, Northumberland	Bastle	Late 16th century or early 17th century	7 January 1988	NY7731289992; 55°12′13″N 2°21′29″W	1156429	Black Middens Bastlehouse circa 800m South-east of Comb More images
Tarset Castle	Lanehead, Tarset, Northumberland	Castle	1267	10 November 1951	NY7879785482; 55°09′48″N 2°20′04″W	1156449	Tarset Castle More images
Bockenfield Farmhouse	Bockenfield, Thirston, Northumberland	House	c. 1660	18 December 1985	NZ1791597828; 55°16′27″N 1°43′10″W	1371020	Upload Photo
Old Felton Bridge over River Coquet	West Thirston, Thirston, Northumberland	Bridge	15th century	20 October 1969	NU1851400294; 55°17′47″N 1°42′36″W	1302949	Old Felton Bridge over River Coquet More images
Roman Catholic Church of All Saints	Thropton Village, Thropton, Northumberland	Roman Catholic Church	1842	21 October 1953	NU0294202203; 55°18′50″N 1°57′19″W	1041910	Roman Catholic Church of All Saints
Togston Hall (formerly northern Area Office of British Coal Opencast Executive)	North Togston, Togston, Northumberland	Castle	16th century	31 December 1969	NU2517102635; 55°19′02″N 1°36′18″W	1041833	Upload Photo
4 Stone Dragons Heads on Lawn East of Hall	Wallington Hall, Wallington Demesne, Northumberland	Sculpture	16th century	20 January 1986	NZ0301984246; 55°09′09″N 1°57′15″W	1154450	4 Stone Dragons Heads on Lawn East of Hall More images
North-east Courtyard Range and Courtyard Wall	Wallington Hall, Wallington Demesne, Northumberland	House	Mid 18th century	30 January 1986	NZ0289884312; 55°09′11″N 1°57′22″W	1154428	North-east Courtyard Range and Courtyard Wall
North-west Courtyard Range and Courtyard Wall	Wallington Hall, Wallington Demesne, Northumberland	House	1766	30 January 1986	NZ0279184277; 55°09′10″N 1°57′28″W	1154425	North-west Courtyard Range and Courtyard Wall
The Arches	Wallington, Wallington Demesne, Northumberland	Courtyard	1735	30 January 1986	NZ0322684922; 55°09′31″N 1°57′03″W	1370638	The Arches
The Garden House	Wallington, Wallington Demesne, Northumberland	House	1766	20 October 1969	NZ0365884262; 55°09′10″N 1°56′39″W	1042862	The Garden House More images
Walled Garden with Gateways	Wallington, Wallington Demesne, Northumberland	Gate	c. 1766	30 January 1986	NZ0360684281; 55°09′10″N 1°56′42″W	1154358	Walled Garden with Gateways More images
Walwick Grange	Warden, Northumberland	House	Early 18th century	12 February 1985	NY9072969304; 55°01′05″N 2°08′47″W	1155301	Walwick Grange More images
Forecourt Wall, Railings and Gates to Bridge End House	Warkworth, Northumberland	Gate	Early 18th century	31 December 1969	NU2480206188; 55°20′57″N 1°36′38″W	1303592	Forecourt Wall, Railings and Gates to Bridge End House More images
Warkworth House Hotel	Warkworth, Northumberland	House	18th century	10 January 1953	NU2475906143; 55°20′55″N 1°36′40″W	1154938	Warkworth House Hotel More images
Ninebanks Tower, adjacent to the South End of Ninebanks Post Office	Ninebanks, West Allen, Northumberland	Manor House	Early 16th century	23 August 1985	NY7820453201; 54°52′23″N 2°20′28″W	1156514	Ninebanks Tower, adjacent to the South End of Ninebanks Post Office More images
Church of St Cuthbert	Bedlington, West Bedlington, Northumberland	Church	Romanesque	18 October 1959	NZ2605081813; 55°07′48″N 1°35′35″W	1153497	Church of St Cuthbert More images
Entrance Screen and Gates to Hartford Hall	Hartford, West Bedlington, Northumberland	Gate	1873	18 December 1986	NZ2432480237; 55°06′57″N 1°37′13″W	1041381	Upload Photo
Hartford Hall	Hartford, West Bedlington, Northumberland	Country House	c. 1807	18 October 1949	NZ2448580126; 55°06′54″N 1°37′04″W	1041423	Hartford Hall More images
The Old Rectory	Whalton Village, Whalton, Northumberland	Tower House	late 14th century or 15th century	29 April 1987	NZ1311781365; 55°07′35″N 1°47′45″W	1247809	The Old Rectory More images
West Manor House	Whalton Village, Whalton, Northumberland	House	1729	29 April 1987	NZ1320081447; 55°07′38″N 1°47′40″W	1264043	Upload Photo
Eslington Park	Eslington Park, Whittingham, Northumberland	Country House	1715-20	21 October 1953	NU0425912093; 55°24′10″N 1°56′03″W	1371446	Eslington Park More images
Whittingham Tower and attached Cottage	Whittingham Village, Whittingham, Northumberland	House	18th century or early 19th century	21 October 1953	NU0692411884; 55°24′03″N 1°53′32″W	1371450	Whittingham Tower and attached Cottage More images
Sharpe's Folly	Whitton, Whitton and Tosson, Northumberland	Folly	1720s	21 October 1953	NU0582300939; 55°18′09″N 1°54′35″W	1155472	Sharpe's Folly More images
Tosson Tower	Great Tosson, Whitton and Tosson, Northumberland	Tower House	14th century	21 October 1953	NU0293100517; 55°17′56″N 1°57′19″W	1371067	Tosson Tower More images
Whitton Tower	Whitton, Whitton and Tosson, Northumberland	House	Mid 19th century	21 October 1953	NU0565701052; 55°18′13″N 1°54′45″W	1371030	Upload Photo
George Stephenson's Cottage	Wylam, Northumberland	House	18th century	15 April 1969	NZ1259664982; 54°58′45″N 1°48′17″W	1044925	George Stephenson's Cottage More images
West Wylam Bridge	Hagg Bank, Wylam, Northumberland	Railway Bridge	1876	7 March 1985	NZ1113764285; 54°58′23″N 1°49′39″W	1044919	West Wylam Bridge More images
Wylam Hall	Wylam, Northumberland	Apartments	15th century	7 March 1985	NZ1112964622; 54°58′34″N 1°49′40″W	1044924	Wylam Hall
Wylam Station and Stationmaster's House	Wylam, Northumberland	Station Master's House	1835	17 February 1972	NZ1200964490; 54°58′30″N 1°48′50″W	1370462	Wylam Station and Stationmaster's House More images
Holy Island War Memorial	Holy Island (Lindisfarne), Northumberland	War memorial	1922	15 May 1986	NU1263741658; 55°40′06″N 1°48′00″W	1042308	Holy Island War Memorial More images
Beadnell Towers Hotel	Beadnell Beadnell, Northumberland	Hotel	18th century	22 December 1969	NU2296429229; 55°33′22″N 1°38′16″W	1233312	Beadnell Towers Hotel More images

== See also ==
- Category:Grade II* listed buildings in Northumberland
- Grade I listed buildings in Northumberland
