= Preston Tower =

Preston Tower may refer to the following buildings in the United Kingdom:

- Preston Tower, East Lothian, a ruined keep in the Scottish town of Prestonpans
- Preston Tower, Northumberland, a pele tower near the English village of Ellingham
