= Holy Island War Memorial =

War memorial in Northumberland, England

- United Kingdom
- For men from Lindisfarne killed in the First World War
- Unveiled: 1922
- Location: 55.66827°N 1.80065°W; The Heugh, Lindisfarne, Northumberland
- Designed by: Sir Edwin Lutyens

Listed Building – Grade II*
- Official name: Lindisfarne War Memorial
- Designated: 15 May 1986
- Reference no.: 1042308

Holy Island War Memorial, or Lindisfarne War Memorial, is a First World War memorial on the tidal island of Lindisfarne (or Holy Island) off the coast of Northumberland in the far north east of England. Designed by Sir Edwin Lutyens, the memorial is a grade II* listed building.

== Background ==
In the aftermath of the First World War, thousands of war memorials were built across Britain. Amongst the most prominent designers of memorials was the architect Sir Edwin Lutyens, described by Historic England as "the leading English architect of his generation". Lutyens designed the Cenotaph on Whitehall in London, which became the focus for the national Remembrance Sunday commemorations, as well as the Thiepval Memorial to the Missing—the largest British war memorial anywhere in the world—and the Stone of Remembrance which appears in all large Commonwealth War Graves Commission cemeteries and in several of Lutyens's civic war memorials. Lindisfarne's memorial is one of fifteen War Crosses by Lutyens, all sharing a broadly similar design.

Lutyens established his reputation as an architect designing country houses for wealthy clients; his connection with Lindisfarne originated in 1902 with a commission to redevelop the 16th-century Lindisfarne Castle into a country residence for Edward Hudson, the owner of Country Life magazine and of several properties for which he engaged Lutyens's services. This connection is believed to have led to his commission for Holy Island War Memorial. Lutyens gave his services pro bono to the island's war memorial committee.

== History and design ==
Holy Island War Memorial is a Lutyens War Cross design, constructed of pink ashlar from nearby Doddington, the same material used for Lindisfarne Priory. The construction work was undertaken by a Mr Tolly of Belford, Northumberland. The cross is formed of a tapered, lozenge-shaped shaft approximately 5 metres (16 feet) tall with short arms near the top linked to it with cyma moulding. The shaft rises from a base of three square stones, which stand on a single circular step. The central stone bears the inscription: "TO THE GLORY OF GOD / AND IN GRATEFUL MEMORY OF / OUR GLORIOUS DEAD / 1914 – 1918" on the east face; the inscription "TO THE GLORY OF GOD / AND IN GRATEFUL MEMORY OF / OUR GLORIOUS DEAD / 1939 – 1945" was added later in memory of the dead from the Second World War. Beneath the inscriptions, on the lower stones of the base, are the names of Lindisfarne's war dead.

The memorial was unveiled on 4 June 1922 at a well-attended ecumenical ceremony. The unveiling was performed by Major Morley Crossman DSO while the Reverend WB Hall performed the dedication.

The memorial is sited on the Heugh, within view of Lutyens's Lindisfarne Castle and its gardens (by Lutyens and Gertrude Jekyll) and adjacent to the ruins of Lindisfarne Priory. It was severely damaged during winter storms in 1983–4; the shaft snapped in two as a result of exceptional winds and the top part was later replaced.

Holy Island War Memorial was designated a grade II listed building on 15 May 1986. In November 2015, as part of the commemorations of the centenary of the First World War, Lutyens's war memorials were recognised as a "national collection" and all of his free-standing memorials in England were listed or had their listing status reviewed, and their National Heritage List for England list entries were updated and expanded. As part of this process, the Lindisfarne memorial was upgraded from grade II to grade II*.

== See also ==
- Hartburn War Memorial, another Lutyens War Cross in Northumberland
- Grade II* listed buildings in Northumberland
- Grade II* listed war memorials in England
