= Aitchison baronets =

Baronetcy in the Baronetage of the United Kingdom

The Aitchison Baronetcy, of Lemmington in the county of Northumberland, is a title in the Baronetage of the United Kingdom. It was created on 31 January 1938 for Sir Stephen Aitchison, of Lemmington Hall, Northumberland, a Justice of the Peace for the city and county of Newcastle upon Tyne and for Northumberland.

== Aitchison baronets, of Lemmington (1938) ==
- Sir Stephen Aitchison, 1st Baronet (1863–1942)
- Sir Walter de Lancy Aitchison, 2nd Baronet (1892–1953)
- Sir Stephen Charles de Lancy Aitchison, 3rd Baronet (1923–1958)
- Sir Charles Walter de Lancy Aitchison, 4th Baronet (born 1951)

The heir apparent is Rory Edward de Lancey Aitchison (born 1986)
