= Morpeth Court =

Municipal building in Morpeth, England

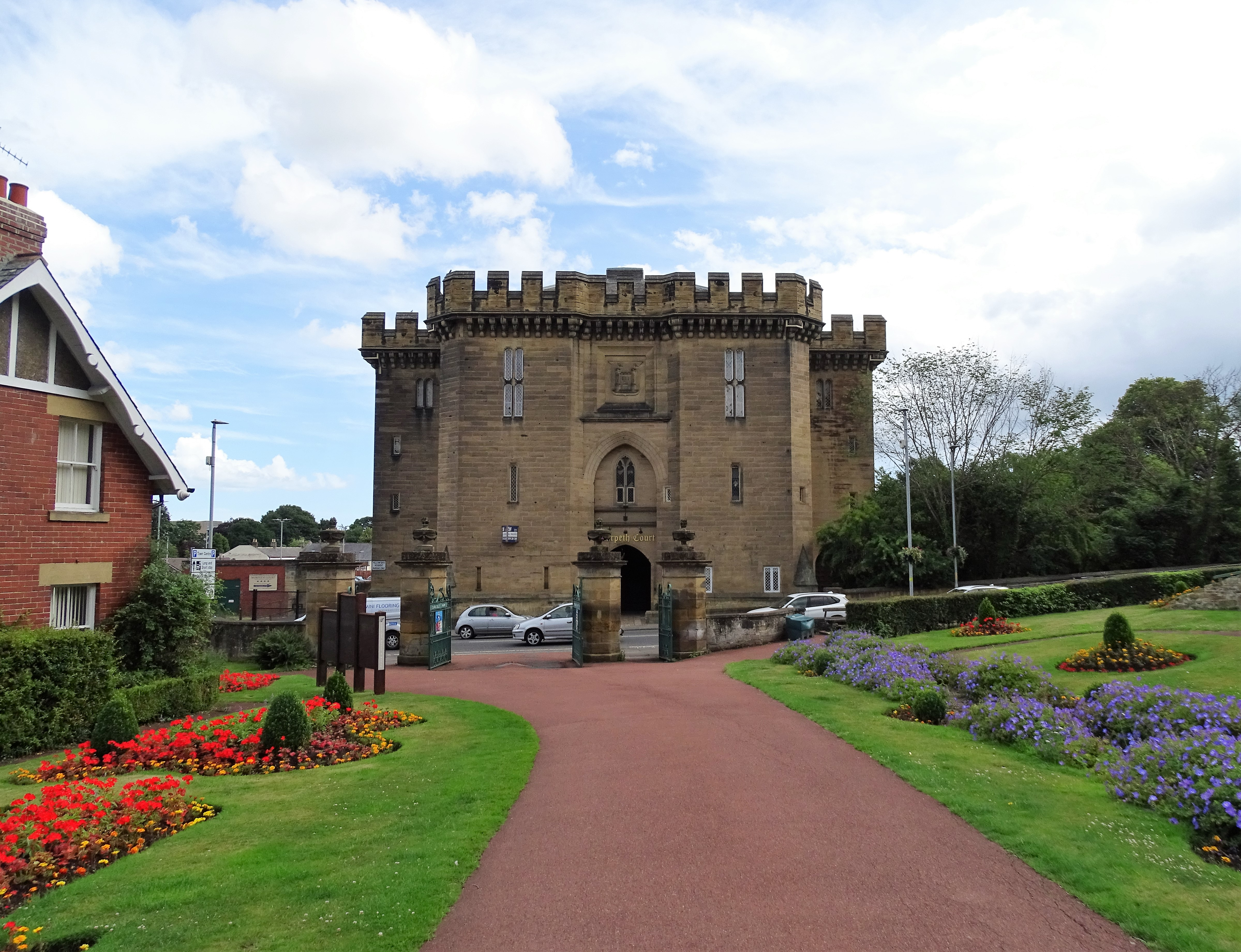
- Morpeth Court

- Shown in Northumberland
- 55.1651°N 1.6854°W
- Location: Castle Bank, Morpeth

History
- Built: 1828

Site notes
- Architect: John Dobson
- Architectural style: Gothic Revival style

Listed Building – Grade II*
- Official name: The Court House
- Designated: 11 August 1950
- Reference no.: 1303244

Morpeth Court is a former judicial structure on Castle Bank, Morpeth, Northumberland, England. The structure, which used to be the entrance block for a prison as well as the main courthouse for the area, is a Grade II* listed building.

== History ==
The original custodial facility for the area was Morpeth Castle which was used for incarcerating criminals from at least the early 16th century. When this arrangement became inadequate, the local lord of the manor, Charles Howard, 3rd Earl of Carlisle, made a site on Bridge Street available and a new prison opened there on 30 November 1704. The Bridge Street Prison was refurbished in 1774 but, by the early 19th century, it was also inadequate and it was converted into a private house.

The proposed layout for the site on Castle Bank involved an octagonal outer wall, a rectangular prison building at the centre of the site and an entrance block at the front breaking the outer wall at that point. The complex was designed by John Dobson in the Gothic Revival style, built in ashlar stone at a cost of £71,000 and was completed in November 1828. The design of the entrance block involved a symmetrical main frontage of three bays facing onto Castle Bank. The central bay, which was recessed, featured an arched opening on the ground floor, a bi-partite mullioned and transomed window on the first floor and a panel bearing a carving of the borough coat of arms on the second floor. The outer bays, which featured canted corners, were fenestrated with small diamond-paned windows on the ground floor, lancet windows on the first floor and pairs of closely-set lancet windows on the second floor. There were towers projecting from the side elevations and the roof was heavily castellated.

The entrance block contained an imperial staircase leading up to a semi-circular courtroom above. The courtroom was first used for a county meeting to discuss the Reform Bill in February 1831 and was first used for the quarter sessions in April 1832. Following the implementation of the Capital Punishment Amendment Act 1868, which abolished the practice of public executions, Richard Charlton, who had been convicted of murdering his wife, became the first person to be executed inside the prison in December 1875. After prisoners were transferred to Newcastle Gaol, which had also been designed by Dobson, the prison closed in 1881. The prison block was demolished in the late 19th century and a police station was built on that part of the site.

The entrance block, which became known as The Courthouse, continued to be used as a magistrates' court until hearings moved to Bedlington in 1980. It was then sold, for a nominal sum, to a developer who converted it into a nightclub. After the night-club became a magnet for young late-night trouble-makers, it closed in 1990. The courtroom was then used as a ladies-only health club from in 1998 until 2006. The building was marketed for sale in 2007 and subsequently converted into apartments.

== See also ==
- Grade II* listed buildings in Northumberland
