= Northumberland Fusiliers' War Memorial Gateway =

Gate in Hexham, Northumberland, England, UK

Coordinates: 54°58′14″N 2°06′11″W

Northumberland Fusiliers' War Memorial Gateway

The Northumberland Fusiliers' War Memorial Gateway is a First World War memorial in Hexham, Northumberland, England. It commemorates the service of the 1/4th battalion of the Northumberland Fusiliers in the First World War. It was designated a Grade II* listed building in 1951.

== Description ==
The war memorial is a rusticated stone arch which dates to the 17th century or early 18th century, about 6 m (19 ft 8 in) high and 3.5 m (11 ft 6 in) wide. It was constructed as part of the White Hart Inn in Fore Street, Hexham, but was removed in 1919 and re-erected beside Beaumont Street, on the east side of The Sele public park, to serve as a war memorial. The building that housed the White Hart Inn was demolished in 1927. The site became part of Robbs and later Beales department store, and more recently the Yorkshire Trading Company, with its former location now marked by a plaque.

The arch has rusticated piers supporting a rounded archway, quoined spandrels, and entablature topped by a segmental pediment. It has metal railings to either side, and supports a pair of metal gates which form one of the entrances to The Sele.

Metal plaques are mounted on each pier, which record that "THIS ARCH WAS PRESENTED TO THE / TOWN TO COMMEMORATE THE SERVICES / OF THE 4TH NORTHUMBERLAND FUSIL/IERS (T.F.) IN FRANCE AND BELGIUM/ DURING THE WAR 1915-1918/ THE COMPANIES WERE FROM / THE FOLLOWING PLACES / A HEXHAM / B BELLINGHAM / C HAYDON BRIDGE / D PRUDHOE / E CORBRIDGE / F HALTWHISTLE / G NEWBURN / H PRUDHOE / HEADQUARTERS HEXHAM / THE GIFT OF J.T.R 1919", and that "THE BATTALION MOBILISED AT HEXHAM / ON AUGUST 4TH 1914 & PROCEEDED TO / FRANCE ON APRIL 20TH 1915 / IT TOOK PART IN THE FIGHTING / AT THE FOLLOWING PLACES ... / THE GIFT OF J.T.R 1919" The battles listed include Ypres, Armentières and Hill 60 in 1915, The Somme in 1916 and 1917, Arras and Passchendaele in 1917, and St Quentin, The Lys and The Aisne in 1918. No individuals are named.

The memorial unveiled on 25 October 1919 by Major General Sir Percival Spearman Wilkinson, colonel of the Northumberland Fusiliers, who commanded 50th (Northumbrian) Division. It was restored in 1998 for the 80th anniversary of the Armistice of 11 November 1918, but by 2014 is was in fair to poor condition.

== Robb family ==
The donor "JTR" was James Thomas Robb, a local businessman who owned Robbs department store, who funded the memorial in thanks for the return of his three sons, William, Ridley and Milne, who all served as captains in the 4th battalion of the Northumberland Fusiliers. The regiment expanded to 52 battalions in the war, becoming the second largest infantry regiment of the British Army after the 88 battalions of the London Regiment.

The oldest son William was wounded at the Second Battle of the Somme, but remained in the army, and was later Major General William Robb, commanding the army garrison on Malta towards the end of the Second World War. Ridley served for four years and was promoted to lieutenant colonel and commander of the 4th battalion, but returned to civilian life after the war. The third son Milne transferred to the Royal Flying Corp, and was later Air Chief Marshal James Milne Robb, serving as commander-in-chief of Fighter Command, Vice-Chief of the Air Staff, and ending his career as Inspector-General of the RAF.

White Hart plaque on the former Robbs and Beales building (left)

Left plaque

Right plaque

== See also ==
- Grade II* listed buildings in Northumberland
- Grade II* listed war memorials in England
