= Rothley, Northumberland =

Village in Northumberland, England

Rothley
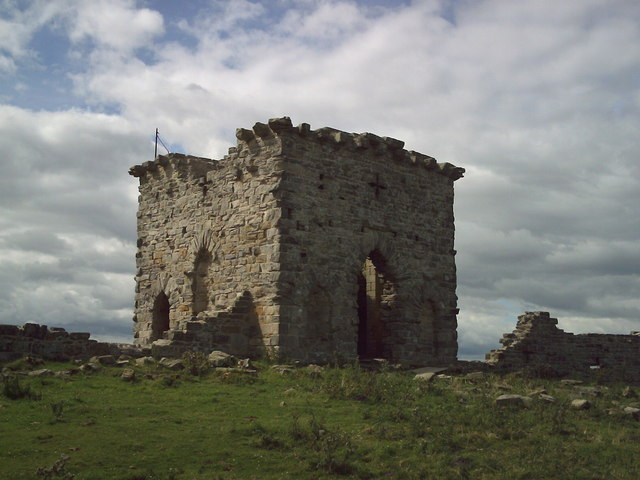
- Rothley Castle

- Location within Northumberland
- Population: 160 (2011 census)
- OS grid reference: NZ044880
- Civil parish: Rothley
- Shire county: Northumberland
- Region: North East
- Country: England
- Sovereign state: United Kingdom
- Post town: MORPETH
- Postcode district: NE61
- Police: Northumbria
- Fire: Northumberland
- Ambulance: North East
- UK Parliament: Berwick-upon-Tweed

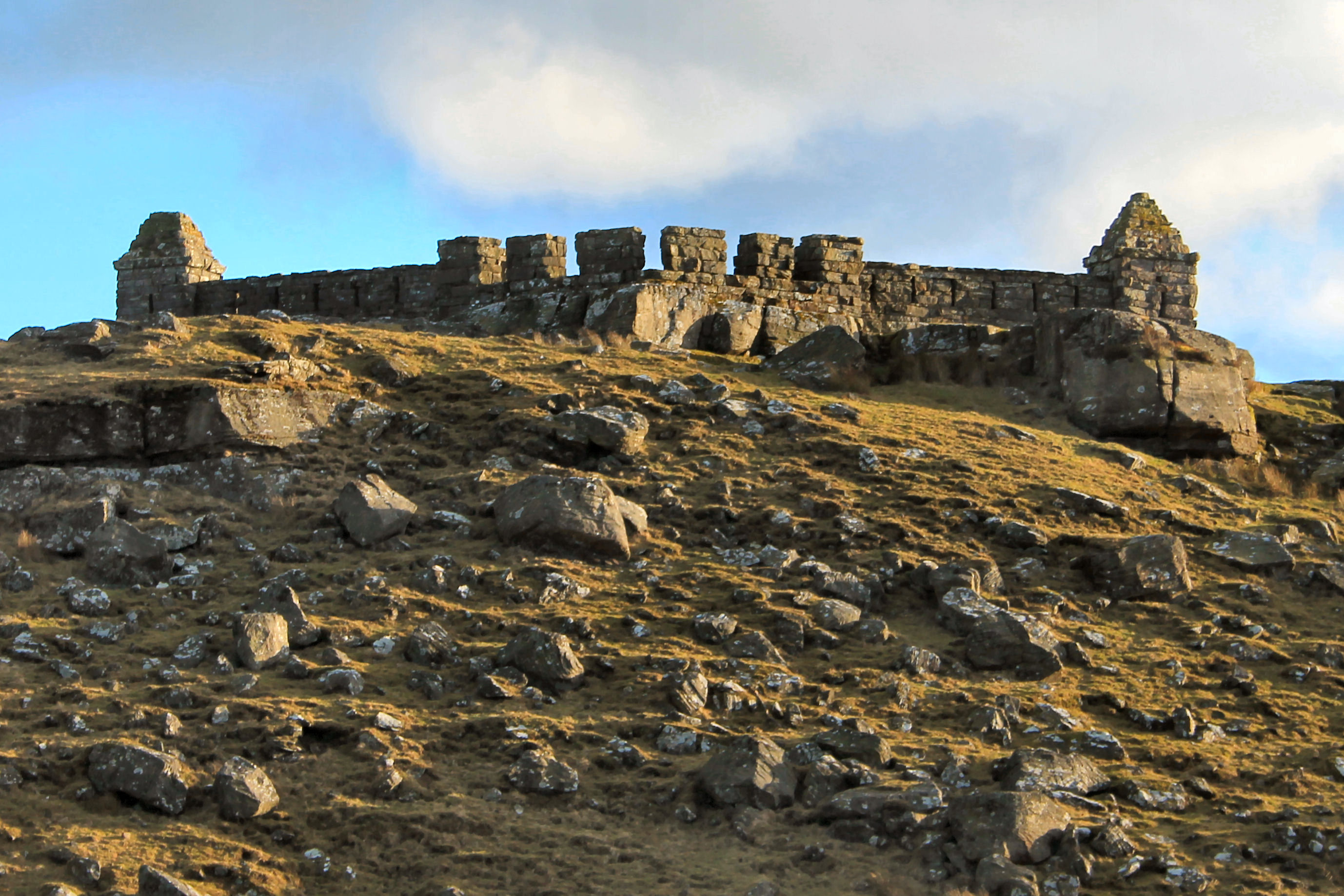
Codger Fort

Rothley is a small settlement and civil parish in Northumberland, England about 2 miles (3 km) north east of Cambo and about 6 miles (10 km) west of Morpeth.

== Governance ==
Rothley was formerly a township in Hartburn parish, in 1866 Rothley became a civil parish in its own right. It is now within the unitary authority of Northumberland. Both parish and unitary authority have responsibility for different aspects of local government. It is in the parliamentary constituency of Berwick-upon-Tweed. On 1 April 1955 The parish absorbed Fairnley, Hartington and Hartington Hall.

== Landmarks ==
Rothley Castle (55.1929°N 1.9328°W) is an 18th-century gothic folly built to resemble a medieval castle, situated at Rothley. It was designed in 1755 by architect Daniel Garrett for Sir Walter Blackett, owner of Wallington Hall, from where it is visible on the hillside.

Rothley Crags (55.1926°N 1.9349°W), a wild tract of country which was once Sir William Blackett's deer-park. With the mania our ancestors had for ruins, and surely there were enough in Northumberland already without building them, Sir William had some most realistic castellated ruins built on the top of the crags!

Rothley Lake (55.2067°N 1.9356°W) breaks the bareness of the scenery, prettily bordered with trees and overlooked by a wall of rugged crags topped by Codger Fort. Rothley Lakes (divided by a road) were created for the Wallington estate by Capability Brown. Codger Fort (55.2053°N 1.9316°W) was erected by Sir Walter Blackett after the Jacobite rising of 1745, probably to demonstrate his loyalty. The fort contained six cannon and hence would have proved a serious obstacle to any invading forces. The fort was designed by Thomas Wright of Durham, and has also been interpreted as a folly like Rothley Castle to the south. Huge beeches and pines line the ascending road from the lake.

On the banks of a burn near the village are several rocks perforated by small holes. According to local legend, these holes were used by fairies for cooling porridge.
