= Newton-by-the-Sea =

Civil parish in Northumberland, England

Coordinates: 55.519°N 1.628°W

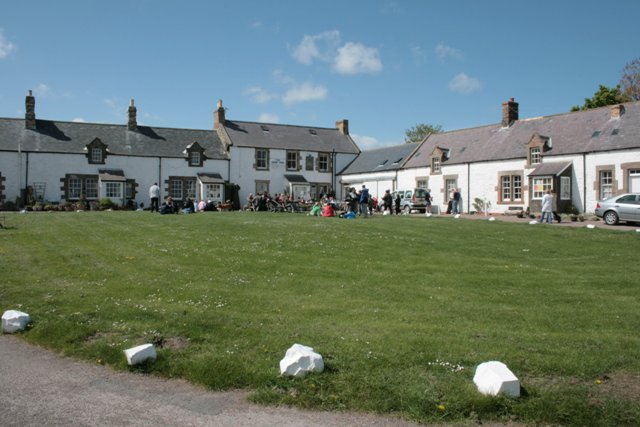
- Low Newton-by-the-Sea in May 2007

- Location within Northumberland
- Population: 212 (2011 census)
- OS grid reference: NU236251
- Unitary authority: Northumberland
- Ceremonial county: Northumberland
- Region: North East
- Country: England
- Sovereign state: United Kingdom
- Post town: ALNWICK
- Postcode district: NE66
- Police: Northumbria
- Fire: Northumberland
- Ambulance: North East
- UK Parliament: North Northumberland

Newton-by-the-Sea is a civil parish in the county of Northumberland, England. The parish is about 8 miles northwest of Alnwick, and lies on the coast between the larger settlements of Embleton and Seahouses. Newton-by-the-Sea is in the parliamentary constituency of Berwick-upon-Tweed. The population of the parish in the 2011 United Kingdom census was 212. The area of the parish is 15.82 square kilometres (6.11 sq mi)

There are two distinct settlements in the parish: High Newton-by-the-Sea (which, despite its name, is about half a mile inland) and the coastal Low Newton-by-the-Sea, owned by the National Trust. The area is notable for the diversity of birds to be observed. Just to the south is Embleton Bay.

Newton Hall is an 18th-century country house in High Newton-by-the-Sea. It is a grade II listed building and is today used as a hotel and wedding venue. The Ship Inn at Low Newton-by-the-Sea is an 18th-century pub with its own microbrewery. Brewing started in 2008, and over 20 different cask ales are produced.

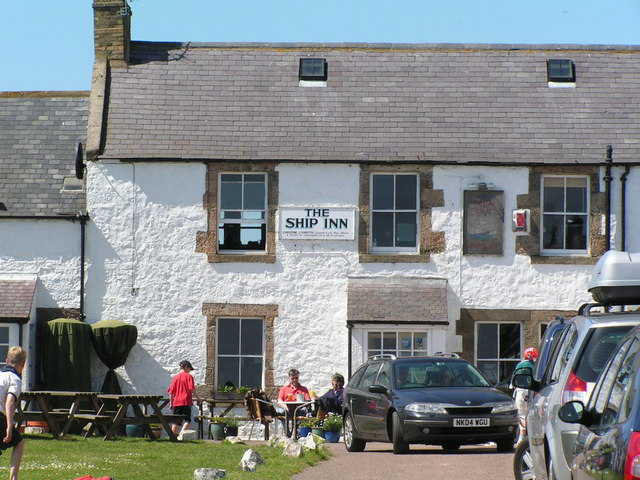
Ship Inn, Low Newton

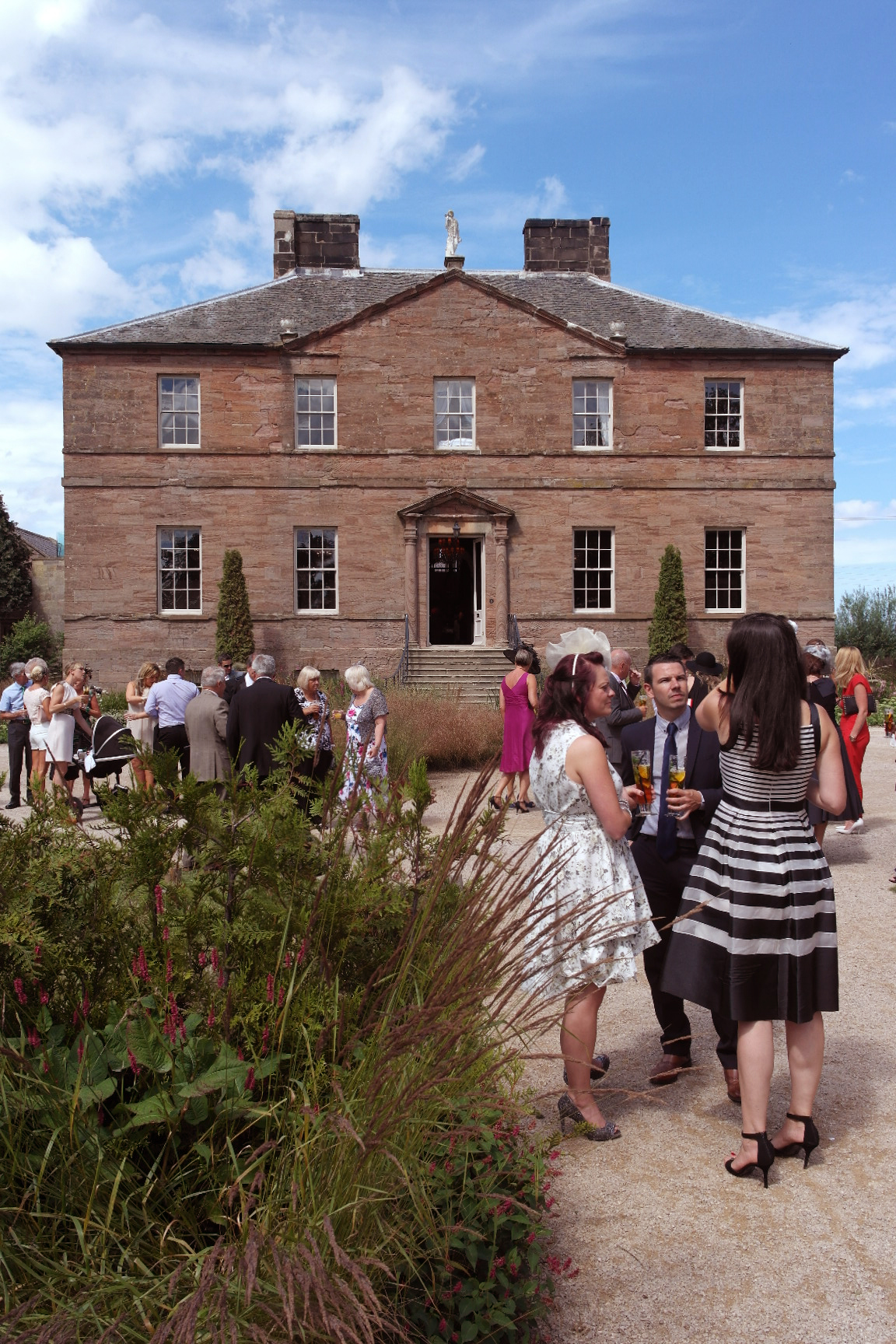
Newton Hall

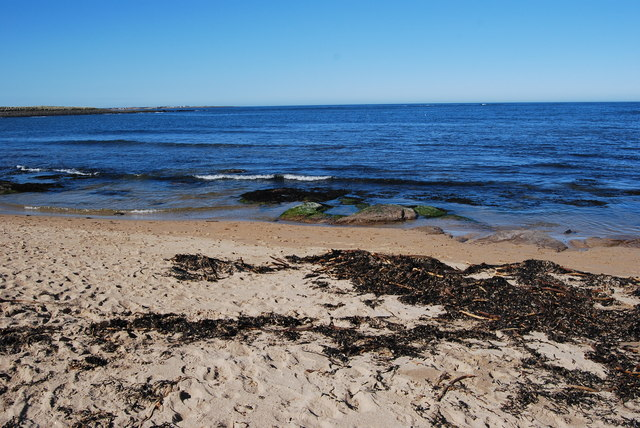
Football Hole Bay

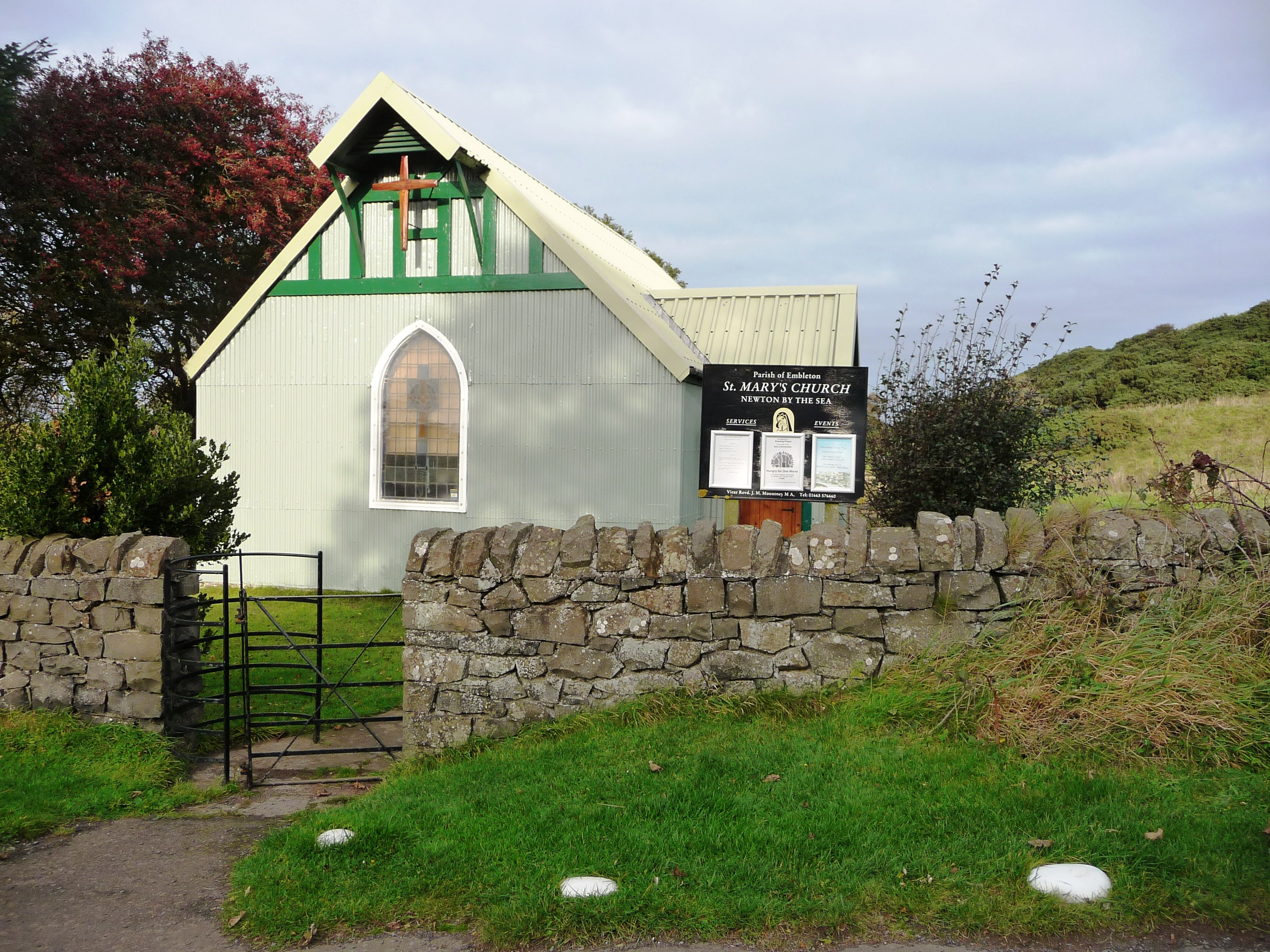
St Mary's Church
