= Collingwood House, Morpeth =

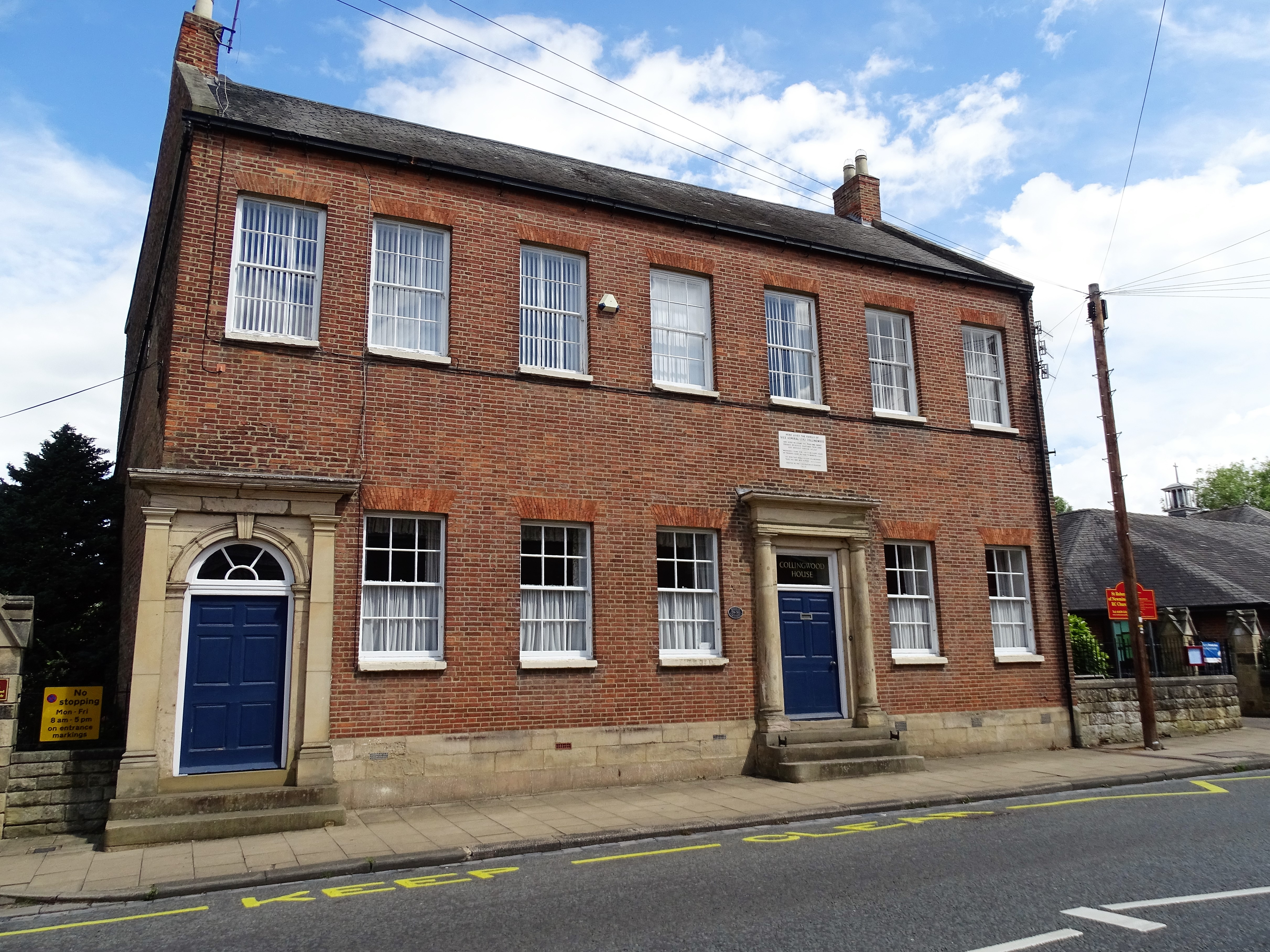

- Location in Northumberland

General information
- Location: Northumberland, England, UK
- Coordinates: 55.167706°N 1.692792°W
- OS grid: NZ200858

Collingwood House is a late 18th-century Georgian house, having Grade II* listed building status, at Oldgate, Morpeth, Northumberland. It was the home of Admiral Lord Collingwood from 1791 to his death at sea in 1810.

The house is now used as the presbytery for the priest at the nearby Roman Catholic Church dedicated to St Robert of Newminster. The house hosts an annual celebration to commemorate Trafalgar Day on 21 October, particularly the role played by Admiral Lord Collingwood, whose ship helped break the Spanish line at the Battle of Trafalgar.

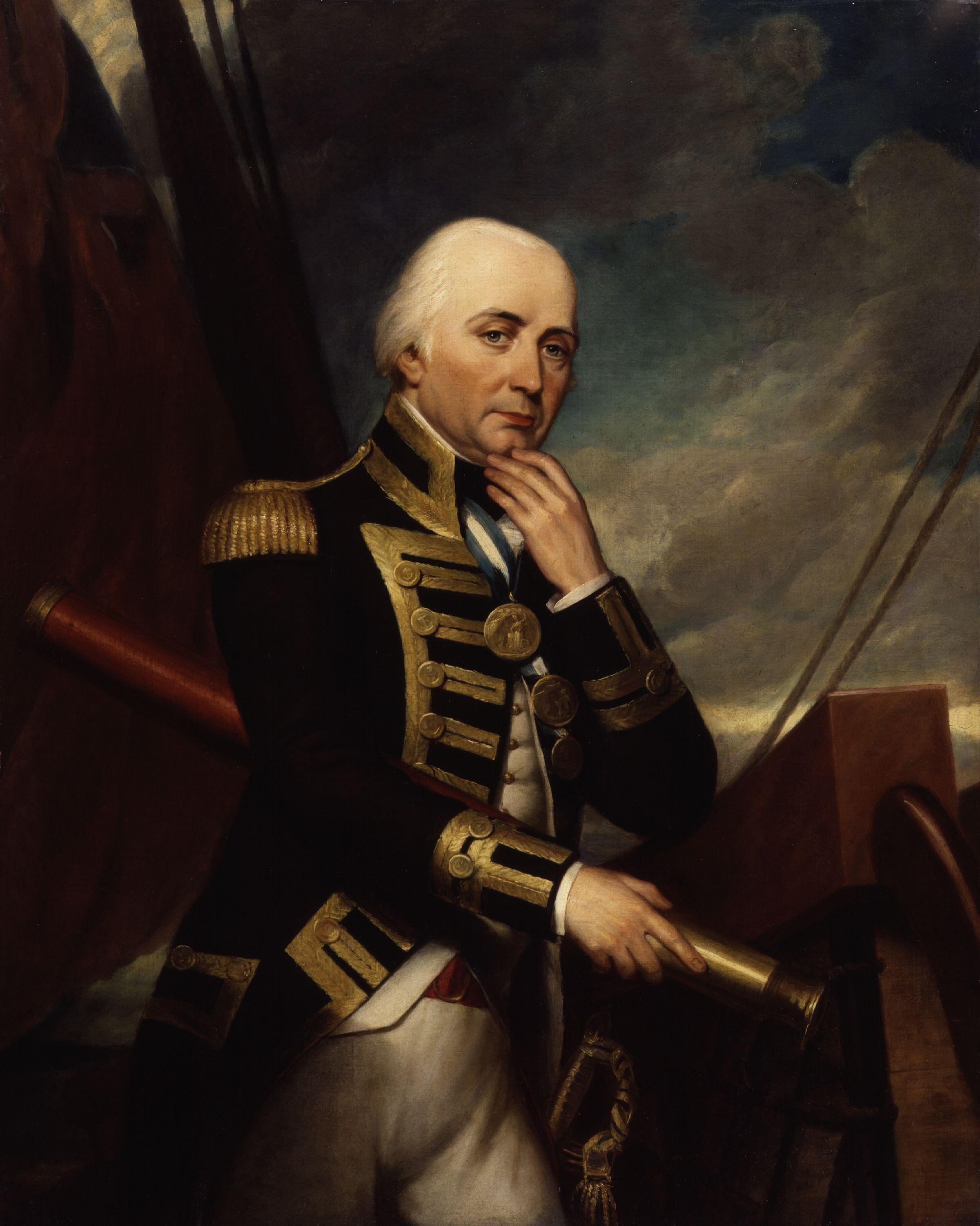
Admiral Lord Collingwood
