= Newton Hall (Newton-by-the-Sea) =

Grade II listed Building Newton By The Sea

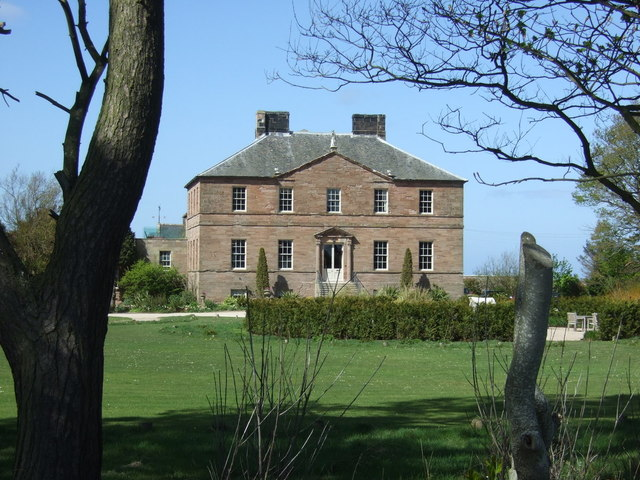
- Newton Hall from the south
- Interactive map of the Newton Hall (Newton-by-the-Sea) area

General information
- Type: Country house
- Architectural style: Georgian
- Location: High Newton-by-the-Sea, Northumberland, England
- Coordinates: 55°31′04″N 1°38′04″W
- Construction started: late 18th century
- Completed: late 18th century

Design and construction
- Architect: William Newton (attributed)

Listed Building – Grade II*
- Official name: Newton Hall
- Designated: 10 January 1953
- Reference no.: 1041747

Newton Hall (Newton-by-the-Sea) is an 18th-century country house at High Newton-by-the-Sea in Northumberland, England. It is listed at Grade II* on the National Heritage List for England. The house now operates as a hotel and wedding venue.

== Location ==
Newton Hall stands on rising ground south of High Newton-by-the-Sea, overlooking the North Sea coastline.

== History ==
Newton Hall was built in the late 18th century as a country house for physician Joseph Forster. The house is attributed to Newcastle architect William Newton (1730–1798).

The house remained a private country residence into the 20th century before conversion to commercial hospitality use.

=== Current use ===
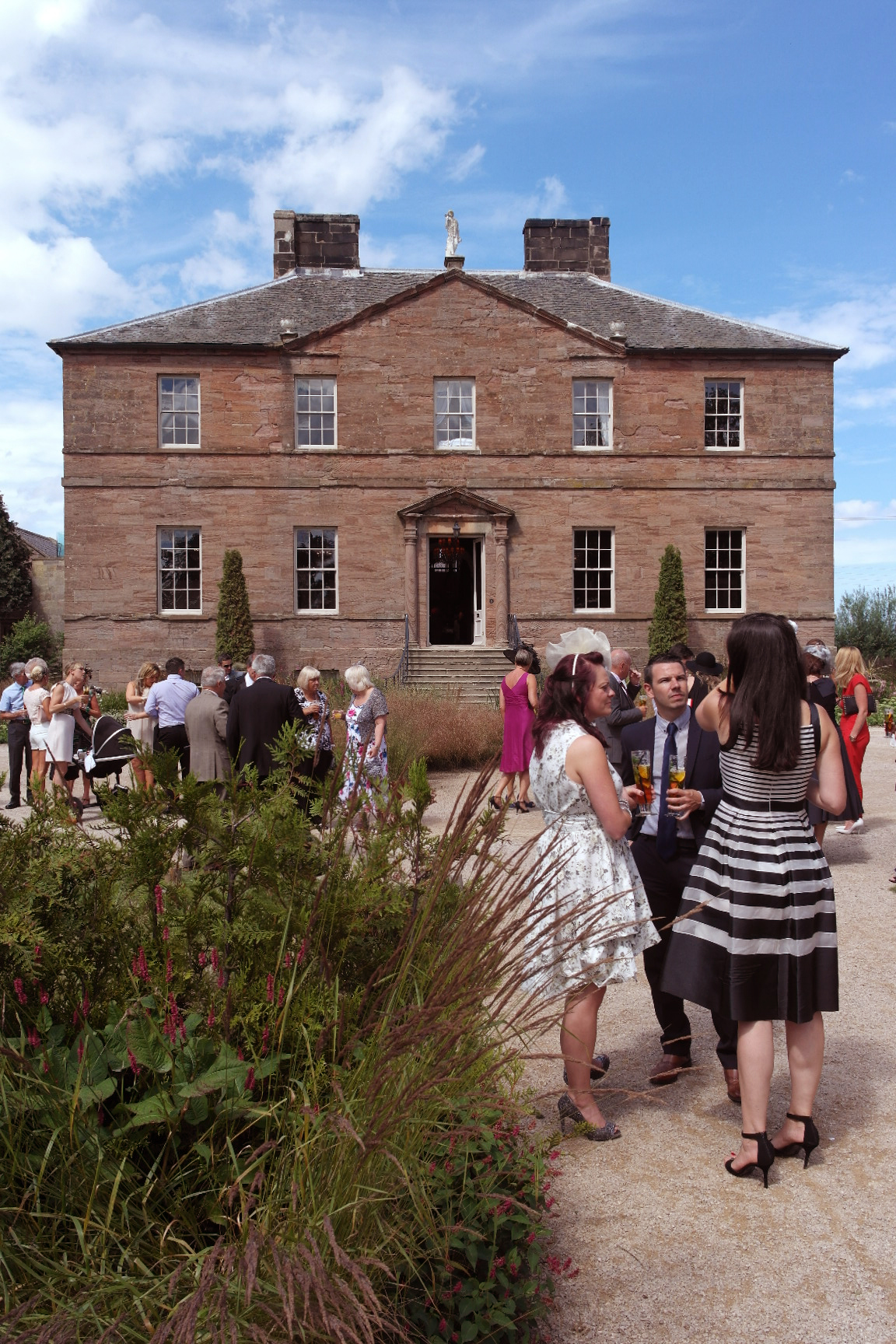
Newton Hall as wedding venue

Newton Hall operates as a boutique hotel and wedding venue, hosting civil ceremonies and receptions on the estate. The property provides sole use celebrations with on-site accommodation.

== Architecture ==
Historic England describes Newton Hall as a late-18th-century country house of pink sandstone ashlar with Scottish slate roof. The principal south front has two storeys above a basement and is five bays wide, with a central doorway approached by stone steps.

The house is described as a Georgian villa with compact, symmetrical plan, with principal rooms arranged to take advantage of coastal views.

== Heritage designation ==
Newton Hall is recorded as a Grade II* listed building (list entry 1041747) as maintained by Historic England, one of the statutory lists for protected buildings in the United Kingdom. The hall was added to the list in January 1953. The 'star' category places it in the upper section of Grade II listings, reserved for particularly important buildings of more than special interest.
