= Meldon Park =

Mansion in Meldon, Northumberland, England

Coordinates: 55°09′48″N 1°49′56″W

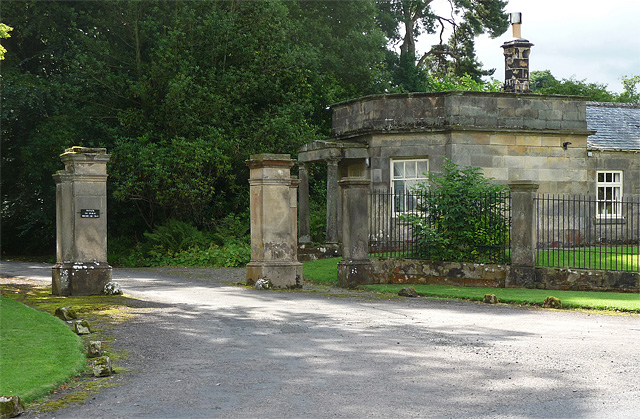
Lodge and gateway to Meldon Park, 2010

Meldon Park is a privately owned country mansion situated at Meldon, Northumberland. It is a Grade II* listed building.

== Present building ==
In 1832, Isaac Cookson commissioned architect John Dobson to replace the old manor, which stood on the banks of the River Wansbeck, with a new mansion, which was completed in 1835. During the 20th century, extensive internal improvements and embellishments were carried out by Edwin Lutyens.

== Historical ownership ==
The Manor of Meldon was anciently held by the Fenwick family from whom it passed by marriage to the Radclyffes. James Radclyffe, 3rd Earl of Derwentwater lost the estate to the Crown following his attainder for treason in the 1715 Jacobite rising. The house was put on the market for sale in 2022.

=== Cookson family ===
The Crown granted the estate to the Greenwich Hospital, by whom it was sold in 1832 for £55,000 to Isaac Cookson, a wealthy Newcastle upon Tyne merchant. Cookson was Mayor of Newcastle in 1809 and High Sheriff of Northumberland in 1838. In 1881, the Cookson family lived in some style with eighteen servants. The house and grounds were sold in December 2022. Meldon Park offers holiday accommodation (known as Meldon Cottage) which is available to book.

== Resources ==
The Cookson Family Papers are archived at Durham University Library Archives.
