= Holy Island Cottage =

Georgian house in England

Coordinates: 54°58′26″N 2°06′20″W

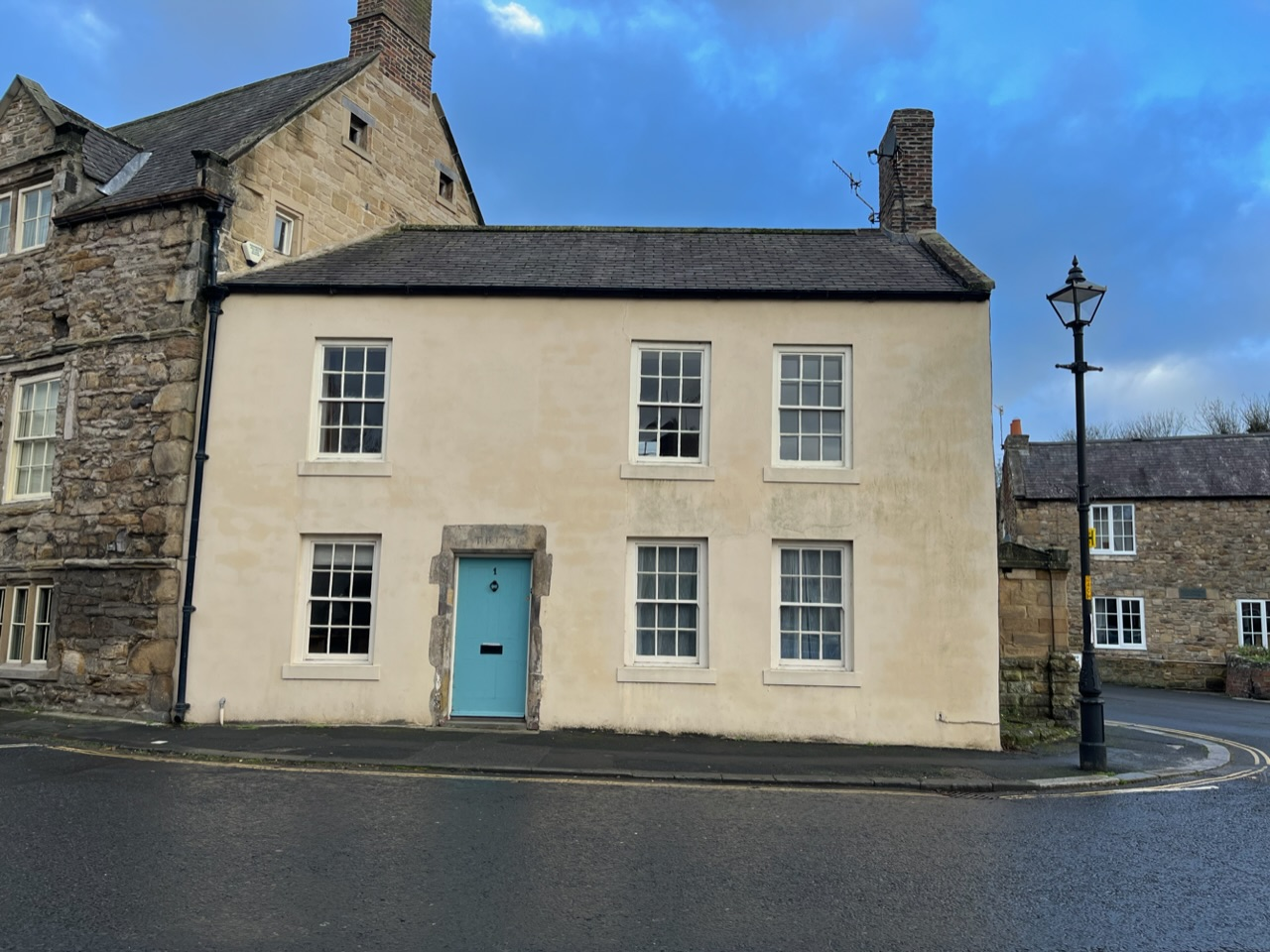
Holy Island Cottage, Hexham, England

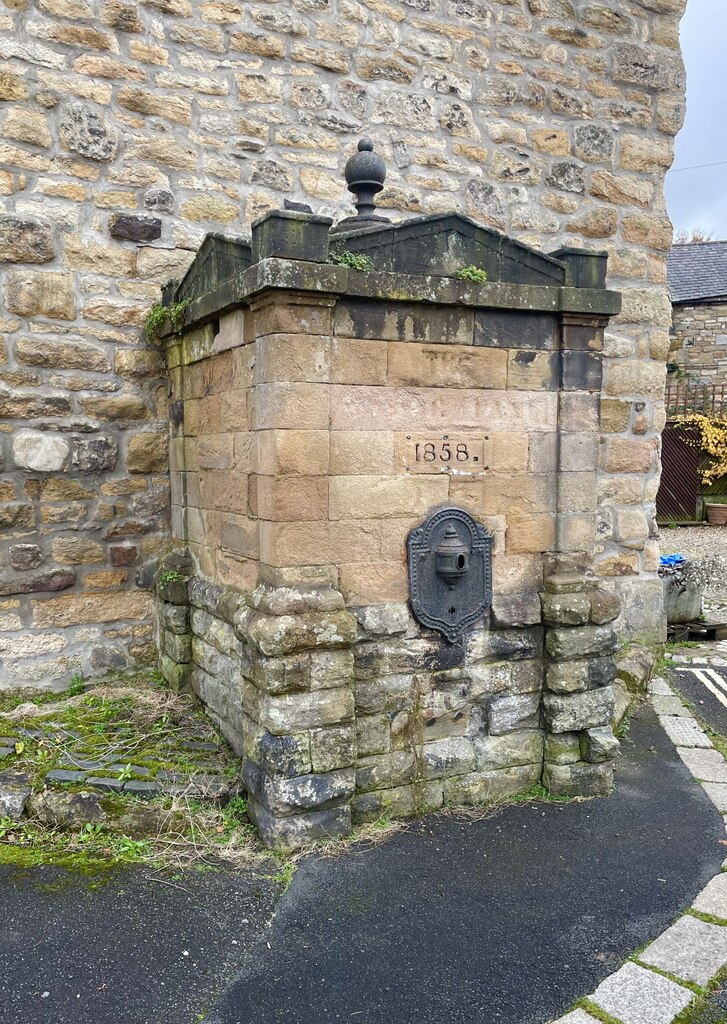
Glover's Pant

Holy Island Cottage, formerly listed as no. 1 (Toad Hall), is a Grade II* listed, early Georgian house located in Hexham, in Northumberland, England. Built in 1737, the house is constructed of stone and has a render front. It adjoins Glover's Pant, a Grade II listed aedicular drinking fountain constructed in 1858. The fountain served the Gilesgate neighbourhood at a time when there were numerous tanneries in the area.
