= St Mary's Church, Hexham =

St Mary's Church
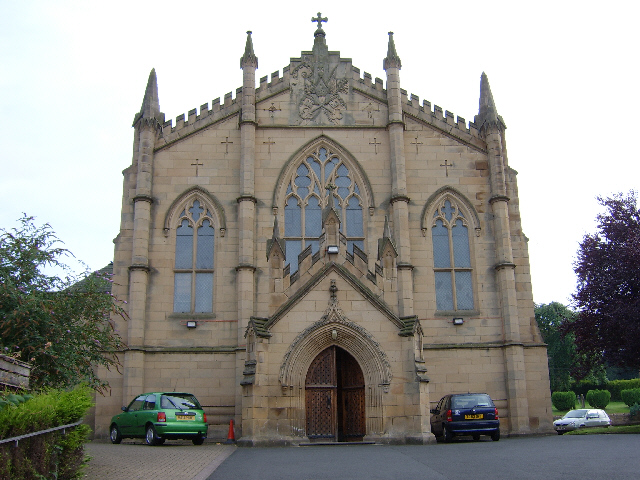
- St Mary's Church
- 54.9693°N 2.1048°W
- OS grid reference: NY 93386 63862
- Location: Hexham
- Country: England
- Denomination: Roman Catholic
- Website: StMaryHexham.org.uk

History
- Status: Parish church
- Founded: 1827
- Dedication: Saint Mary

Architecture
- Functional status: Active
- Heritage designation: Grade II* listed
- Designated: 18 May 1976
- Architect: Fr Michael Singleton
- Style: Gothic Revival
- Groundbreaking: 22 April 1828
- Completed: 22 September 1830

Administration
- Province: Liverpool
- Diocese: Hexham and Newcastle
- Deanery: Heavenfield
- Parish: Hexham

St Mary's Church is a Roman Catholic Parish church in Hexham, Northumberland. It was built from 1828 to 1830 in the Gothic Revival style. It is located on Battle Hill, opposite Hexham Park, close to the town centre. It is a Grade II* listed building.

== History ==
=== Foundation ===
From the 1600s, local Catholics worshipped at Dilston Castle or in Stonecroft House in Newbrough. The mission at Dilston Castle was originally served by secular clergy. The mission at Stonecroft House was served by Dominicans. By 1722, the two missions had moved into Hexham itself. The secular priest at Dilston moved to Cockshaw in Hexham and the Dominican mission moved to Battle Hill before moving to the current Burn Brae House site in 1797. The mission at Dilston Castle continued and was served by Benedictines from Swinburne, Northumberland. On 5 September 1827, the two missions agreed to merge. The chapel in Cockshaw was sold for £600 and plans were made to build the church on the Burn Brae House site.

=== Construction ===
Two architectural plans were made for the new church, one by Ignatius Bonomi and the other by the priest Fr Michael Singleton. The parish went with the plan by Fr Singleton. On 22 April 1828 the foundation stone was laid and the church was built in the Gothic Revival style. During construction the east gable bellcote collapsed causing a delay. On 22 September 1830, the church was opened by Bishop Thomas Penswick, the Vicar Apostolic of the Northern District.

=== Developments ===
In 1832, a school was built across from the church, on the site of the current school. In 1930, it was rebuilt. In 1858, a Sisters of Mercy convent was built behind the church. In 1874, Dilston Castle was sold and five bodies were moved from the chapel there to the church and interred in the church vault. In 1957, the convent was converted into another school and the sisters moved to a house on Hencotes. In 1975, the school was converted into a parish centre before becoming the current presbytery in 2000.

In 1914, the roof fell in and in 1979 the church was refurbished and the sanctuary was reordered. The architect was Jack Lynn. After the renovation the church was re-opened by Hugh Lindsay, the Bishop of Hexham and Newcastle on 21 December 1979.

== Parish ==
St Mary's Church is in the Hexham parish and along with St Oswald's Church in Bellingham, St Mary's Church in Swinburne, St Peter's Church in Otterburn, St John of Beverley Church in Haydon Bridge and St Wilfrid Church in Haltwhistle, is in the partnership of Heavenfield. St Mary's Church has three Sunday Masses at 6:00pm on Saturday, and 10:00am and 6:00pm on Sunday. St John of Beverley Church in Haydon Bridge has its Sunday Mass at 9:00am and St Oswald's Church in Bellingham has its Sunday Mass at 11:00am.

== See also ==
- Media related to St Mary's Catholic Church, Hexham at Wikimedia Commons
- Diocese of Hexham and Newcastle
