= George Stephenson's Birthplace =

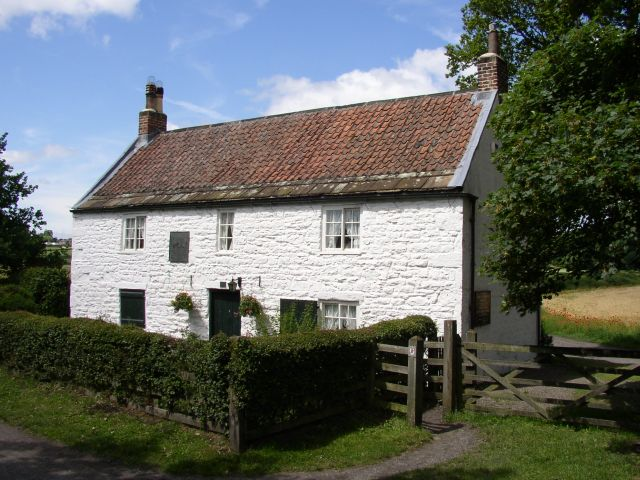
- George Stephenson's Birthplace

- Location within Northumberland
- Location: Riverside Walk, Wylam, Northumberland
- Coordinates: 54.9793°N 1.8047°W
- Type: Historic House Museum
- Owner: National Trust
- Public transit access: Bus and Train to Wylam
- Parking: 0.4 mi (0.64 km) in Wylam village (Pay and Display)
- Website: www.nationaltrust.org.uk/george-stephensons-birthplace

Listed Building – Grade II*
- Official name: George Stephenson's Cottage
- Designated: 15 April 1959
- Reference no.: 1044925

George Stephenson's Birthplace is the 18th-century stone cottage home of rail pioneer George Stephenson. Located along the north bank of the River Tyne in the village of Wylam, Northumberland, the cottage is owned by the National Trust and until recently it was open to the public as a historic house museum. The house also featured exhibits about Stephenson's Rocket, an early steam locomotive. The Museum is no longer open to the public.

The House was built circa 1750 and is a Grade II* listed building. When George Stephenson was born, in 1781, there would have been four families living in this humble two storey cottage.

The house is accessible by bike and is a 0.4 mi (0.64 km) walk from the nearest car park.
