= Cresswell Pele Tower =

Remains of an English castle

- Creswell, Northumberland, England
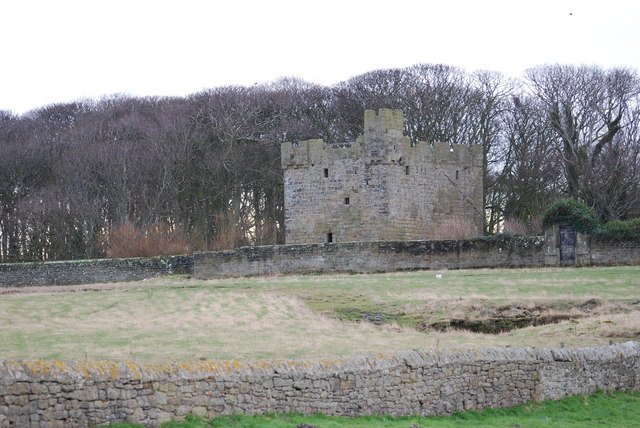
- Cresswell Pele Tower

Site information
- Type: Tower house

Location
- Shown within Northumberland
- Coordinates: 55.2330°N 1.5408°W
- Grid reference: grid reference NZ293933

Site history
- Materials: Stone

Cresswell Pele Tower is in the village of Cresswell, situated overlooking the coast approximately 4 miles (6 km) to the north of Ashington, Northumberland, England.

The tower is a Grade II* listed building and a Scheduled Ancient Monument. It was removed from Historic England's Heritage at Risk register after an extensive renovation completed in 2021, which included the addition of a brand-new wooden-framed roof.

== History ==
Cresswell Pele Tower was constructed in the 14th century as a defence against the Border Reivers. Unlike many of the 80 Pele towers in Northumberland, the Cresswell Tower is in a relatively good state of preservation.

Since its construction the three-storey Pele Tower has had an interesting journey through time.

The engraving shown on the Pele Tower Project websites, for example, is dated 1829 and shows the Pele Tower connected to Cresswell Hall, since demolished. The only remaining evidence of this union surviving above ground today is the front entrance of Cresswell Hall, now bricked up.

Cresswell Pele Tower was probably built in the 14th century. The doorway on the ground floor is not the original entrance; the ground floor was used for storage, and was only accessible from above. The outline of the original entrance on the first floor can still be seen, but has been blocked up. The only way to get to the living quarters above is by a very narrow, twisty stone staircase which was designed to be easily defended.

On the first floor, there was a kitchen, living area, and garderobe (toilet). The top floor was probably used for sleeping and would have been particularly cold and damp as there are no fireplaces at this level. There are stairs from here to the parapet that runs around the top of the tower. Next to the stairs is a faint inscription which is reputed to read “William Cresswell brave hero”.

In about 1750 a grand Mansion House was built onto the side of the tower. This house was demolished in about 1845. For some unknown reason the entrance doorway to the Mansion House was saved, and it can still be seen built into the field wall on the east side of the tower. It is visible on the right in the photo above.

== The White Lady ==
A sad local legend associated with the tower tells how a beautiful daughter of the Cresswell's had fallen in love with a young Danish prince. The couple made plans for the prince to cross the sea from Denmark and carry off the young girl to his home country where they were to be married.

One day he landed on the shore and with great excitement she prepared to meet him. Then, to her horror, she watched her brothers ambush the prince and kill him. The girl, stricken with grief, could not be comforted. She lost all will to live and soon afterwards died of a broken heart.

It is said that her ghost – in the form of a white lady - can still occasionally be seen gazing out to sea from the tower roof.
