= Lemmington Hall =

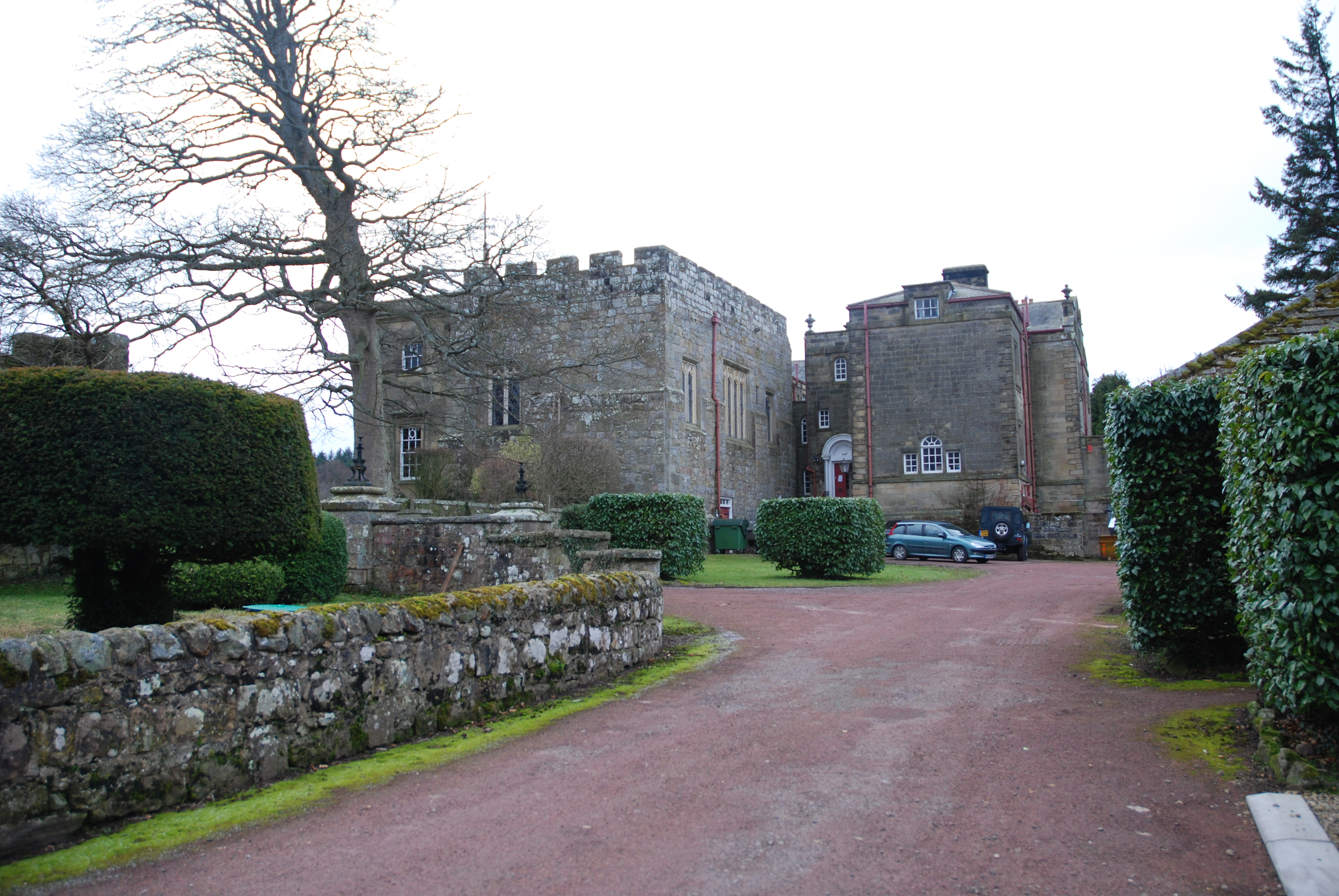
- Rear of hall, showing restored 15th-century tower

- Location in Northumberland

General information
- Location: Northumberland, England
- Coordinates: 55.395460°N 1.810281°W
- OS grid: NU12111129

Lemmington Hall is an 18th-century country mansion incorporating a 15th-century tower house, situated near Edlingham, Northumberland, England. It is a Grade II* listed building. The original tower house built for the Beadnall family in the early 15th century was a four-storey construction which was reduced in height in the 17th century when Nicholas Fenwick (Mayor of Newcastle 1720) converted the building into a country house.

Substantial alterations and improvements were made by architect William Newton in the late 18th century. In 1825, the property was acquired by William Pawson of Shawdon Hall, who served as the High Sheriff of Northumberland in 1826. However, the property fell into disrepair and had become a roofless ruin by the end of the 19th century.

In the 20th century, Lemmington Hall was completely restored by Sir Stephen Aitchison (see Aitchison baronets), who acquired the ruinous property in 1913. In 1927 Aitchison bought an 80-foot-high (24 m) column, designed by Sir John Soane and dedicated to the memory of members of the Evelyn family of Felbridge, Surrey, which he dismantled and re-erected in the grounds at Lemmington. In 1947 the building was converted for use as a convent for the Sisters of the Sacred Heart, then later became a residential care home.

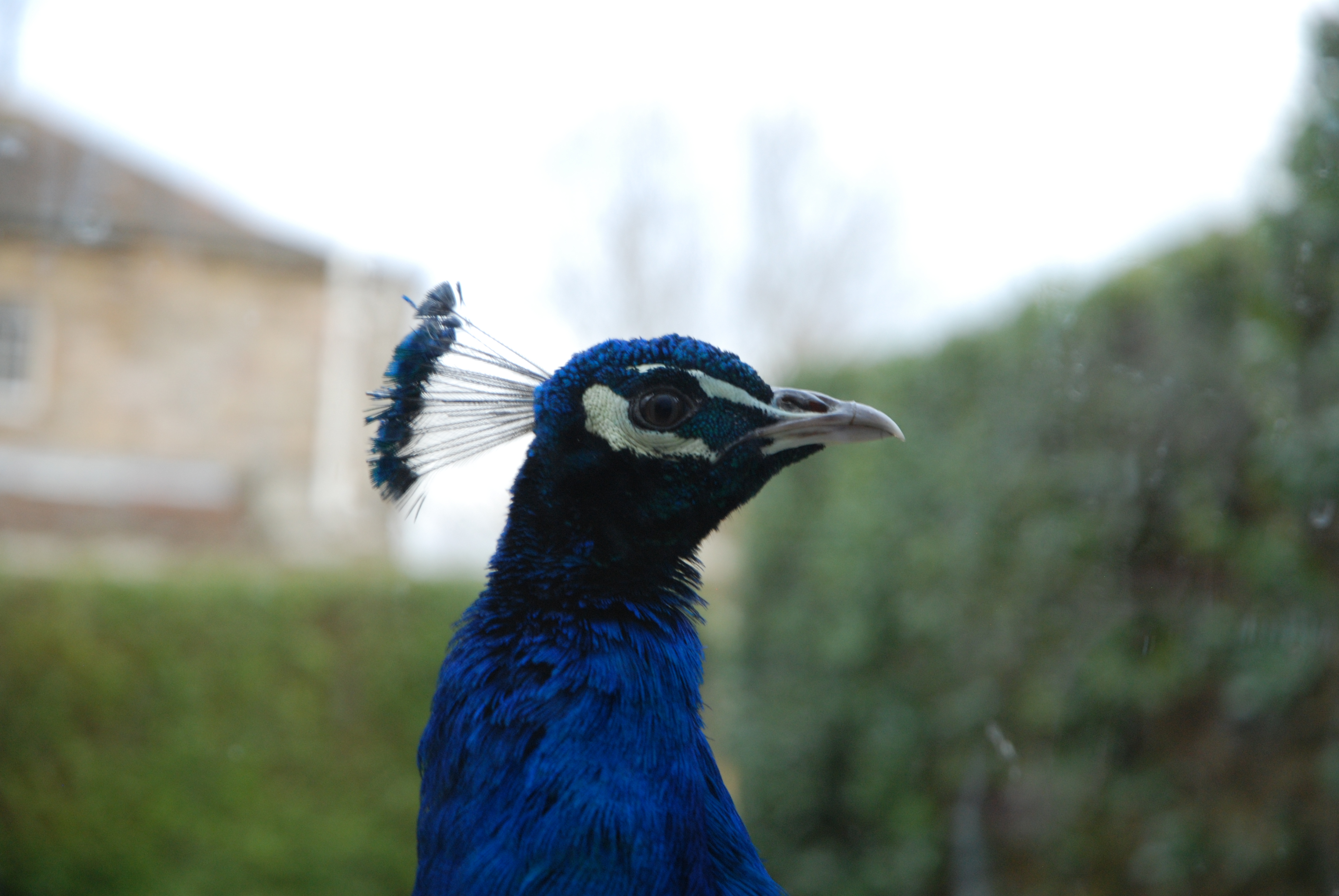
A peacock at Lemminton Hall

More recently, the hall was renovated, under the ownership of the Ruff family. The Ruff family also own a selection of animals on the Lemmington Hall estate including peacocks and peahens.
