= Rothley Castle =

Folly in Rothley, Northumberland, England

- Northumberland, England, UK
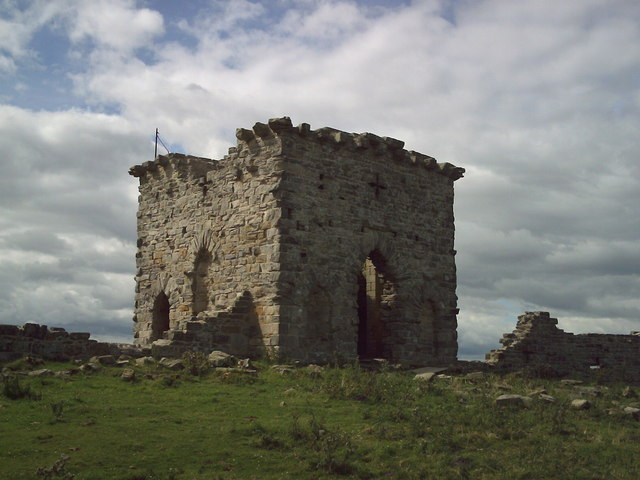

Location
- Location in Northumberland
- Coordinates: 55.193°N 1.932°W
- Grid reference: NZ044887

Rothley Castle is an 18th-century gothic folly built to resemble a medieval castle, situated at Rothley, Northumberland. It is a Grade II* listed building.

It was designed in 1755 by architect Daniel Garrett for Sir Walter Blackett, owner of Wallington Hall, from where it is visible on the skyline. A genuine medieval tower, known as Rothley Tower (which stood nearby), was demolished, probably early in the 19th century.

A similar gothic folly, also part of the Wallington estate, is Codger Fort, on crags about a mile north of Rothley Castle. It is in the form of a triangular gun battery, and was designed by Thomas Wright of Durham.

Both Wallington and Rothley Castle are in the ownership of the National Trust.

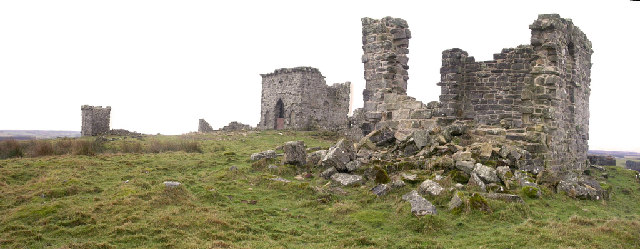
Rothley Castle
