= Cragend Silo =

Building in Northumberland, England

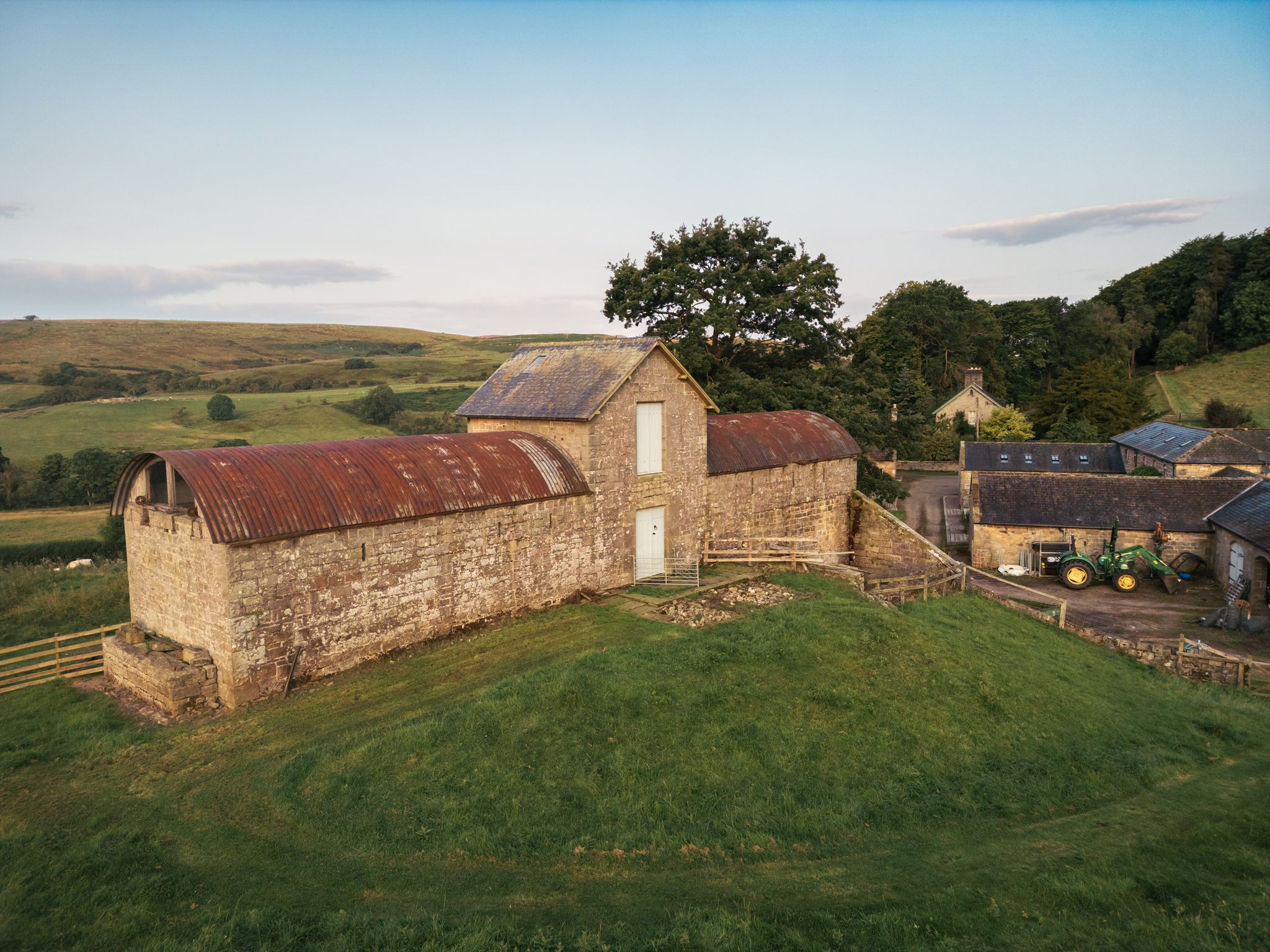

- Location within Northumberland
- 55.302°N 1.8644°W
- Location: Rothbury, Northumberland, United Kingdom

Listed Building – Grade II*
- Official name: Hydraulic Silo Building 70 Metres East of Cragend Farmhouse
- Designated: 25 August 1987
- Reference no.: 1153196

Cragend Silo is a Grade II* listed building located at Cragend Farm near the town of Rothbury in Northumberland, England. It was designed and built by Lord Armstrong of Cragside.

== History ==
William Armstrong (26 November 1810 – 27 December 1900) was an industrialist and inventor who founded the firm of Armstrong Whitworth and developed the business into one of the world's foremost armaments manufacturers. Having spent much of his childhood in Rothbury, in 1862 he returned on a walking holiday, purchased a small parcel of land and built a modest shooting box. Over the next forty years, he enlarged both the house and the estate, making the property one of the most technologically advanced of its time. Armstrong was "especially interested in water power" and expended considerable effort to extending the application of hydraulic power from the industrial into the agricultural and domestic spheres. His home Cragside was the first in the world to be lit by hydroelectric power and the sawmill he designed and built at Debdon, where he combined a turbine with a Siemens horizontal generator was the first development of a hydroelectric power source. The conservators Sarah Schmitz and Caroline Rawson suggest Cragside was "the place where modern living began".

Expanding his landholdings around Cragside, Lord Armstrong acquired Cragend, a nearby 16th-century farmhouse two miles south of Rothbury. He started work on modernising the farm in the 1880s, and around 1895 built the experimental hydraulic silo building now known as Cragend Silo. The design is believed to have been influenced by a French system that Armstrong studied, and was intended to improve the efficiency of processing cut grass into silage. Despite the innovative design, the procedure required a great deal of manual labour: this, coupled with issues caused by fumes emanating from the fermenting grass, led to the silo's abandonment after a short period of operation. Blackburn Lake, which provided hydraulic power for the machinery, was drained around 1930.

Cragend Silo was designated a Grade II* listed building on 25 August 1987.

== Description ==
The building is constructed of snecked stone, with tooled-and-margined dressings. The central block has a Welsh slate roof, and the two rectangular silage bays are roofed with curved corrugated iron. These each contain eighteen large stone drums, and flank the taller cross-gabled centre, which still contains the hydraulic engine, manufactured by Gilkes & Co, in the basement, and a turbine at ground level. A chopping machine, now removed, was originally housed on the first floor and powered by the turbine below. Grass was fed into the first-floor chopping machine before being loaded by hand into the silos below, where it was compressed by the weight of the stone drums. Hydraulic power was used to lift the drums, and for hoists to lift compressed grass, and workers, out of the silos.

== Restoration ==
The building is currently (2019) undergoing restoration work, funded by the Historic Houses Foundation, to make it accessible, including the repair of interior stairs and flooring.

== Sources ==
- Greeves, Lydia (2008). Houses of the National Trust. London, UK: National Trust Books. ISBN 9-7819054-0066-9.
- Heald, Henrietta (2012). William Armstrong: Magician of the North. Carmarthen, UK: McNidder & Grace. ISBN 9-780857-16042-3.
- Pevsner, Nikolaus; Richmond, Ian (2002). Northumberland. The Buildings Of England. New Haven, US and London: Yale University Press. ISBN 978-0-300-09638-5.
- Saint, Andrew (2010). Richard Norman Shaw. New Haven, US and London: Yale University Press. ISBN 9-780300-15526-6.
