= Preston Tower, Northumberland =

C14 pele tower in Northumberland, England

Coordinates: 55°31′20″N 1°42′38″W

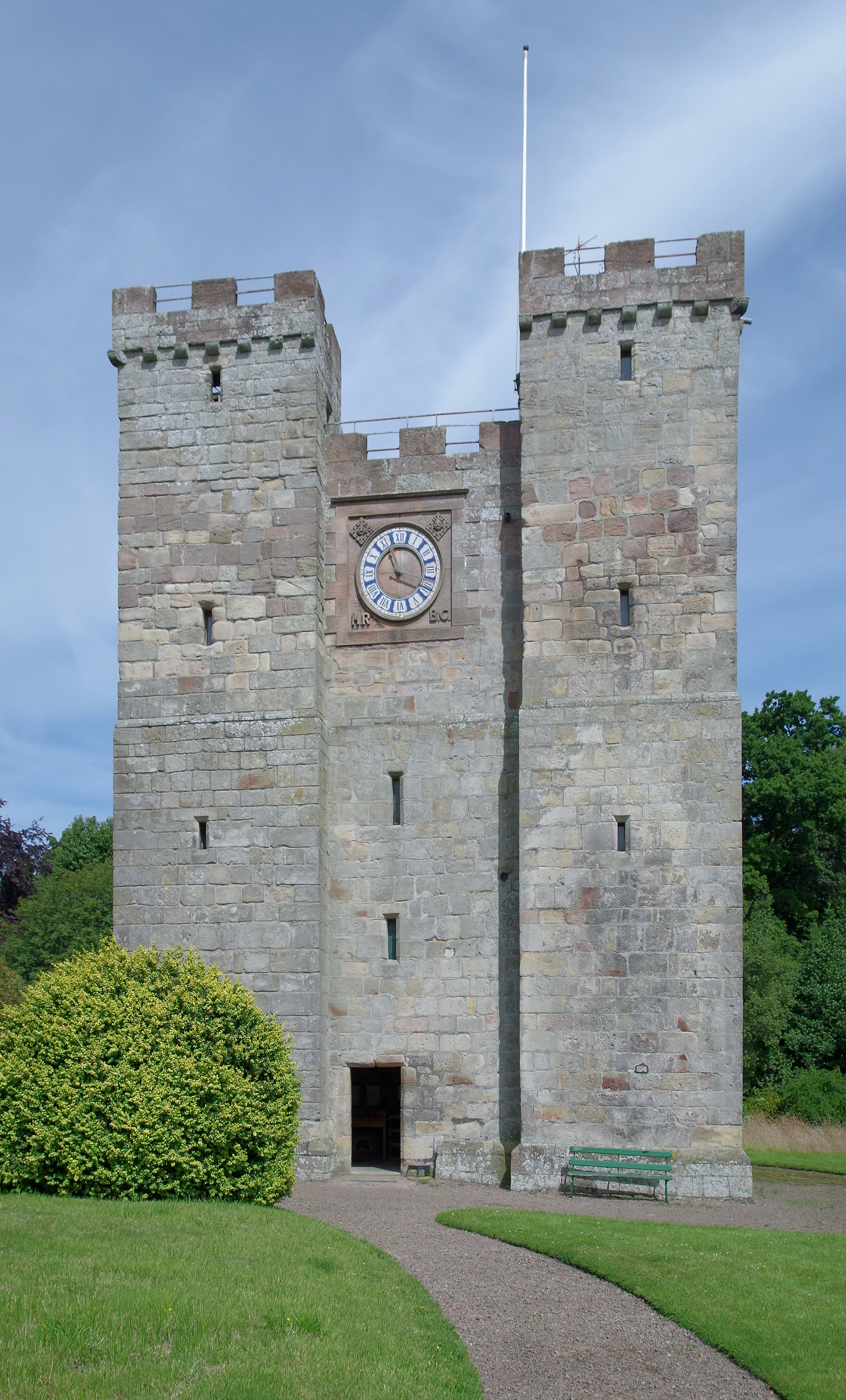
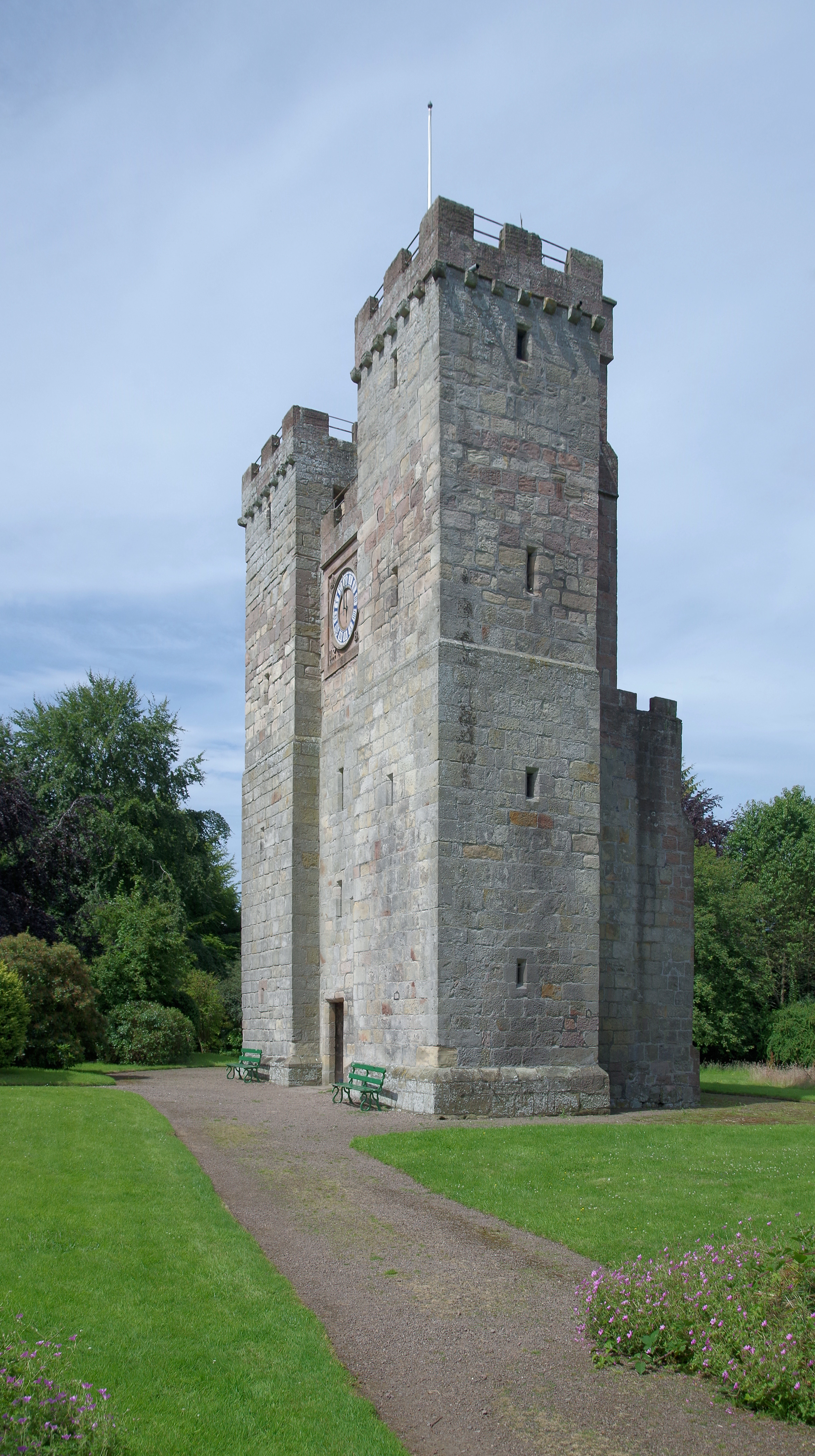
Preston Tower

Preston Tower is a fourteenth-century pele tower in Preston, Northumberland, England built in 1392.

The tower is now a private museum.
