= Boustead (surname) =

Boustead is a surname, and may refer to:

- Bill Boustead (1912–1999), Australian art conservator
- Edward Boustead (1800–1888), English businessman
- Hugh Boustead (1895–1980), British officer, pentathlete, and diplomat
- Kerry Boustead (born 1959), Australian rugby league footballer
- Neil Boustead (born 1953), English cricketer

== See also ==
- Bowstead
