= Sir Frederick Fletcher-Vane, 2nd Baronet =

British politician and landowner

Sir Frederick Fletcher-Vane Bt
- Portrait of Fletcher-Vane by George Romney
- Born: 27 February 1760; Harrow on the Hill, Middlesex
- Died: 26 February 1832 (aged 71); Hutton in the Forest, Cumberland

Sir Frederick Fletcher-Vane, 2nd Baronet (27 February 1760 – 26 February 1832), was a British politician and landowner. He was MP for the pocket borough of Winchelsea, between 1792 and 1794, the borough of Carlisle, between 1796 and 1802, and again for Winchelsea, between 1806 and 1807. Sir Frederick was the 2nd Baronet of Hutton and a descendant of Sir Henry Vane the Elder. In 1788 he served as High Sheriff of Cumberland.

In the words of his grandson, Sir Frederick Fletcher Vane "was not without the faults and passion of youth". He has also been described as a "colourful and difficult character". Notwithstanding the last remark, expressed after Sir Frederick's death, his character and personality while alive were interesting enough to see him successfully proposed for membership of Brooks's in 1796 by the Whig politician and wit, Charles James Fox, Brooks's being a club where the Prince of Wales was a member. Sir Frederick joined the Whig Club on 11 April 1797 and, in 1798, Coleridge and Wordsworth made use of Sir Frederick's library at Hutton. Bobus Smith was the inspiration behind the Whig Club and would later be a trustee on the resettlement of the Fletcher-Vane estates ahead of the marriage in 1823 of Sir Frederick's son, Francis, to Diana Beauclerk, the granddaughter of Topham Beauclerk and Lady Diana Beauclerk.

Sir Frederick changed his surname to Fletcher Vane in 1790. He was the father of Sir Francis Fletcher-Vane, 3rd Baronet, and the grandfather of both Sir Henry Fletcher-Vane, 4th Baronet, and Sir Francis Fletcher-Vane, 5th Baronet.

== Early life ==
Frederick Vane-Fletcher was born at Harrow on the Hill on 27 February 1760 and baptised on 6 March 1760 at St Mary's Church in that parish. He was the son of Sir Lionel Vane-Fletcher, 1st Baronet and Rachel Griffith, the daughter of David Griffith of Llankennen, Carmarthenshire.

There are few public records of Sir Frederick's early years and education; given his position it can be assumed at that time he was educated at home. He was made a lieutenant in the 7th Regiment Dragoons in 1781 and later cornet.

Sir Frederick took the Grand Tour in 1787 and extant letters outline conditions in France and Paris before the French Revolution, describing the splendours of Château de Chantilly where they stayed but then outline the problem of travelling in a land "infested by crowds of beggars" in places where horses needed to be changed making travel by carriage difficult, the plight of the poor in contrast to a rich aristocracy being the economic cause of the French Revolution.

On Monday 27 August 1787, The Times reported that:

The following melancholy accident happened last week at Raby Castle, the seat of the Earl of Darlington: – His Lordship's eldest son, Viscount Barnard, invited his relations and friends to celebrate his birthday. Amongst the former were Sir Frederick Vane and his youngest brother [Henry was the youngest], who, during the time of the glass going jovially round, was suddenly seized with a violent fit of coughing, and broke two blood vessels. The Faculty recommended him to Bath waters, for which he immediately set out, but was taken so ill in going through Knightsbridge, on Sunday last, that he was carried to a lodging house, where he now lies in a very dangerous state. He is attended by Dr Warren and Sir George Baker.

Sir Frederick's brother, Henry, died shortly thereafter.

== Public life ==
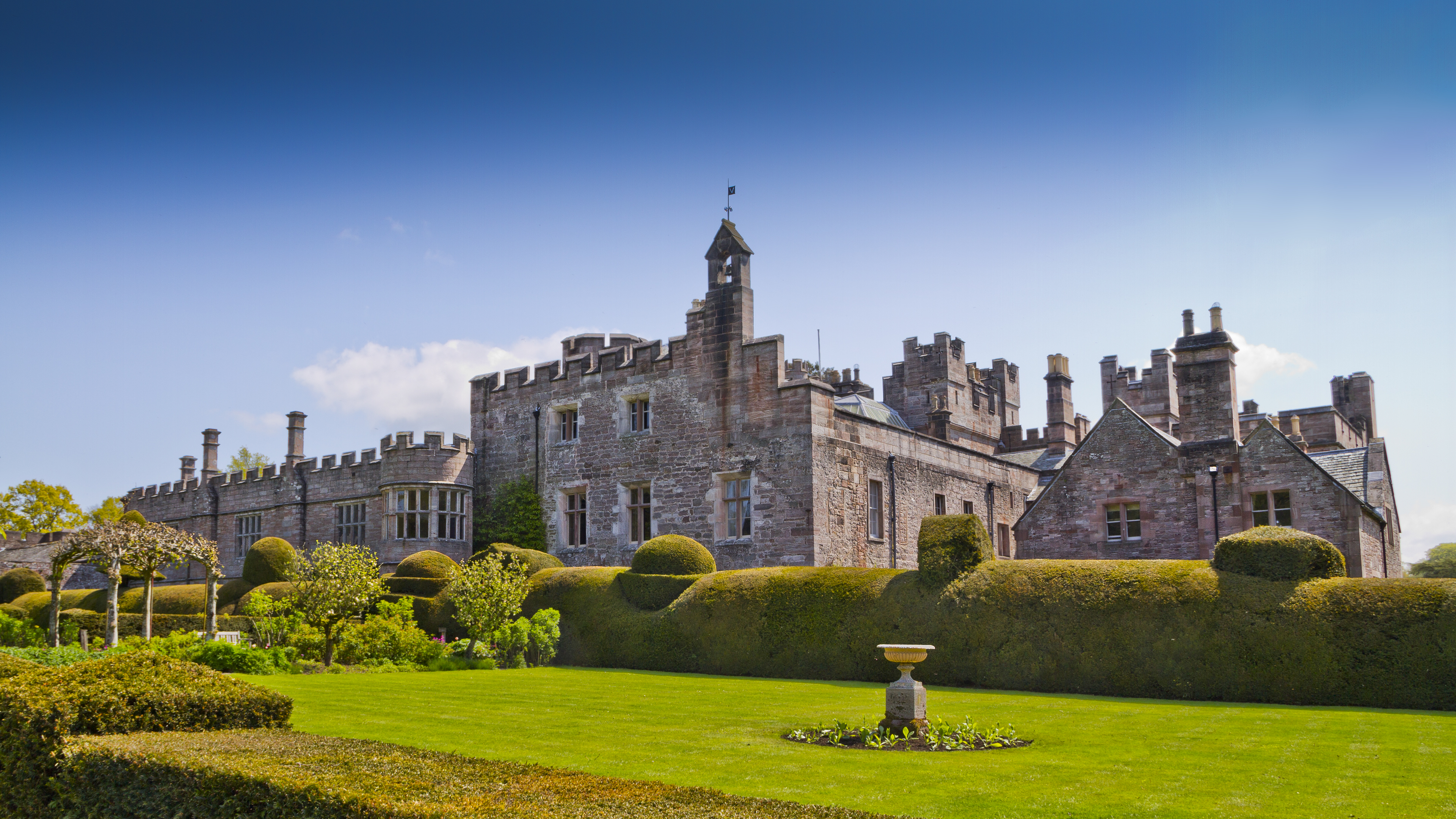
Hutton in the Forest, the seat of the Fletcher-Vane baronets

Sir Frederick was made Sheriff of Cumberland in 1788, and changed his surname from Vane-Fletcher to Fletcher-Vane in 1790. Around this time George Romney was commissioned to take his portrait. At the age of 31, he entered Parliament in the pocket borough of Winchelsea when his kinsman, Viscount Barnard, entered the House of Lords on becoming the 3rd Earl of Darlington in 1792, later first Duke of Cleveland. Winchelsea was considered one of the notorious rotten boroughs of England, abolished by the Reform Act 1832 but at the time under the control of the Earls of Darlington.

In 1793, Sir Frederick was Steward of the Races in Penrith. An advertisement was printed in The Times on 17 April 1793 for the 58th Anniversary of the Cumberland Society to be held on Saturday the 27th at the Crown and Anchor Tavern on The Strand, London. The Crown and Anchor was also the venue for the Whig Club. The advertisement was made on behalf of Sir Frederick F. Vane, Henry Howard Esq, Major Gale, William Brummell Esq, father of Beau Brummell, Joseph Porter Esq and Moses Wm Staples Esq, with tickets to be had at the Bar, 7s 6d each, and "Dinner on Table at Half past Three o'Clock".

In February 1794, Sir Frederick was appointed Steward of East Hendred in Oxfordshire, a technical device to enable Members of Parliament to resign their seat after which he left Parliament. In 1796 Sir Frederick purchased Armathwaite Hall on the shore of Bassenthwaite Lake in the county of Cumberland. It was, perhaps, to improve living conditions for his young family, Hutton being in a parlous state according to contemporaneous accounts. Lord Inglewood, the current incumbent of Hutton in the Forest, stated at a 2014 John Cornforth lecture that Sir Frederick contemplated the sale of Hutton. It is clear that Sir Frederick and his young family largely based themselves at Armathwaite.

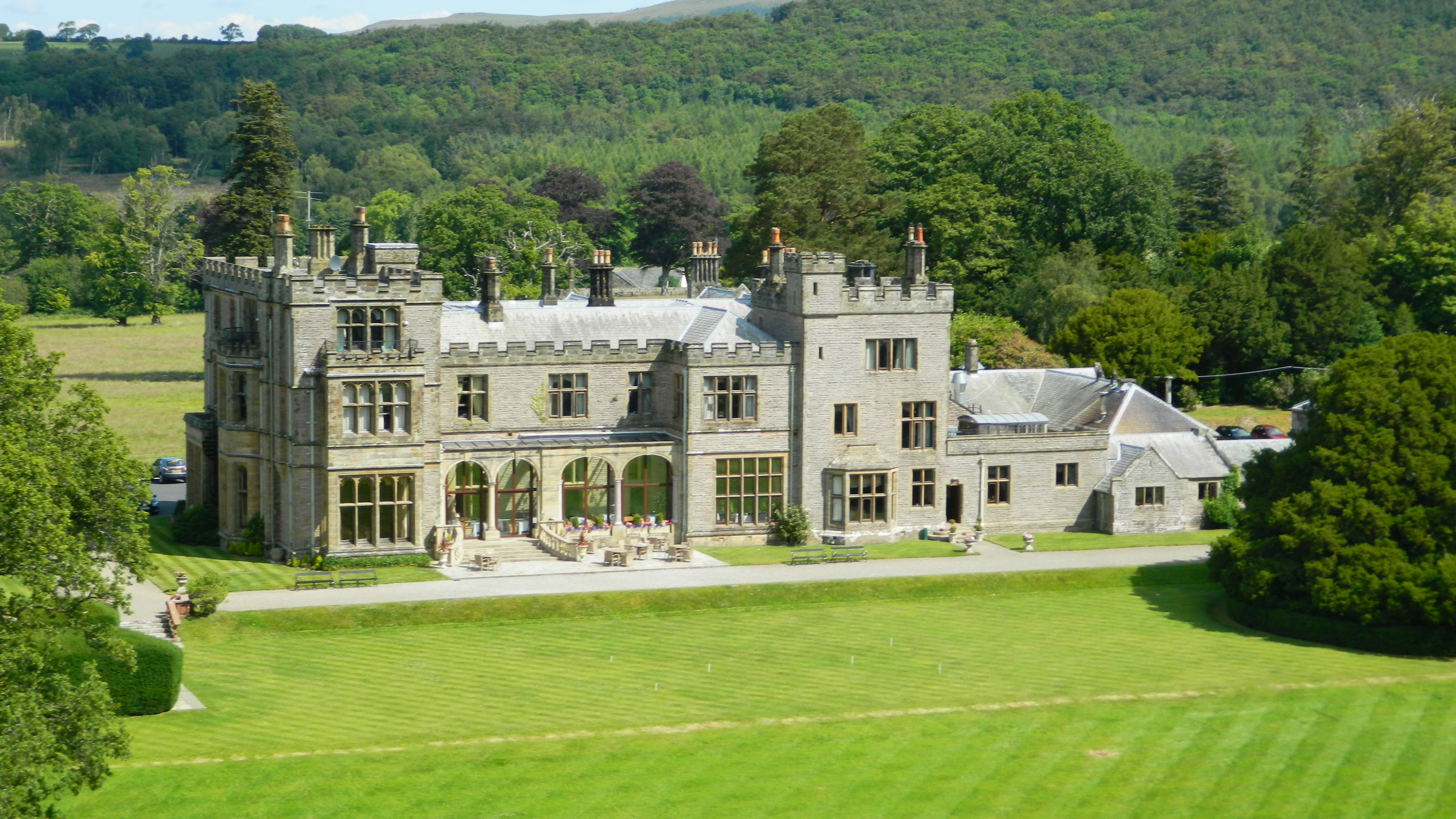
Armathwaite Hall, which Fletcher-Vane purchased in 1796

Sir Francis Fletcher Vane, 5th Baronet, describes Armathwaite in his memoirs:

There on the lake is Armathwaite Hall, the favourite house of my grandfather, where my father spent his early life, and Scarness also on the lake-a favourite of my people [the 4th Baronet also enjoyed Armathwaite and his widow, Lady Margaret, died at Scarness Cottage].

After his move to Armathwaite, in 1796 Sir Frederick was elected MP for Carlisle, replacing Wilson Gale-Braddyll as the partner of John Christian Curwen in the anti-Lowther interest. The anti-Lowther faction in the North West of England concerned the control of the parliamentary dual member borough of Carlisle that was contested by three old Cumberland families: the Howards, Earls of Carlisle, the Musgraves and the Lowthers. In the north west of England, the Lowther family also controlled the pocket borough of Cockermouth, like Winchelsea a rotten borough abolished by the Reform Act 1832, together with the double member borough of Westmorland. By 1761, the Howard's control of Carlisle was weakening and Sir James Lowther took the opportunity to take control of the borough. The freemen of the city of Carlisle were upset by this and agreed to fund any candidate prepared to challenge the Lowther's position. On election day, a Lowther candidates, John Stanwix, decided to withdraw from the election and the electorate of Carlisle chose Curwen, an independent, together with a Lowther candidate, Raby Vane.

In 1796, Sir Frederick was elected to Brooks's on the proposal of Charles James Fox and voted with the Whigs on four occasions before the end of Parliament that year. He joined the Whig Club on 11 April 1797, whose future members included Lord Byron. Bobus Smith was the inspiration behind the Whig Club and would later be a trustee on the resettlement of the Fletcher-Vane estates ahead of the marriage of Sir Francis Fletcher-Vane, 3rd Baronet, to Diana Beauclerk. In 1798, Coleridge and Wordsworth made use of Sir Frederick's library at Hutton.

Sir Frederick's anti-Lowther sentiment took a more violent turn in 1798 when he challenged Lord Lonsdale to a duel. The duel took place in Hyde Park and, without an outcome, again in Bayswater. The quarrel was eventually called off by a magistrate.

Sir Frederick regained the seat of Winchelsea in 1806 but retired in 1807 when the seat was taken by Sir Oswald Mosley. In the General Election of 1818, Sir Frederick failed in his attempt to win the pocket seat of Cockermouth as part of the anti-Lowther movement spearheaded by Henry Brougham. In one of his last political acts, Sir Frederick signed the requisition of a county meeting in Cumberland in October 1819 to consider the Peterloo Massacre having written to Henry Brougham on 30 September:

I made this addition opposite my name, "and also to consider of the necessity of a reform in Parliament". If that question is not brought forward, it might appear that a change of ministers was our only object, but I suppose most of us will be of opinion that no change can be of much use without a reform in the borough system.

== Family life ==
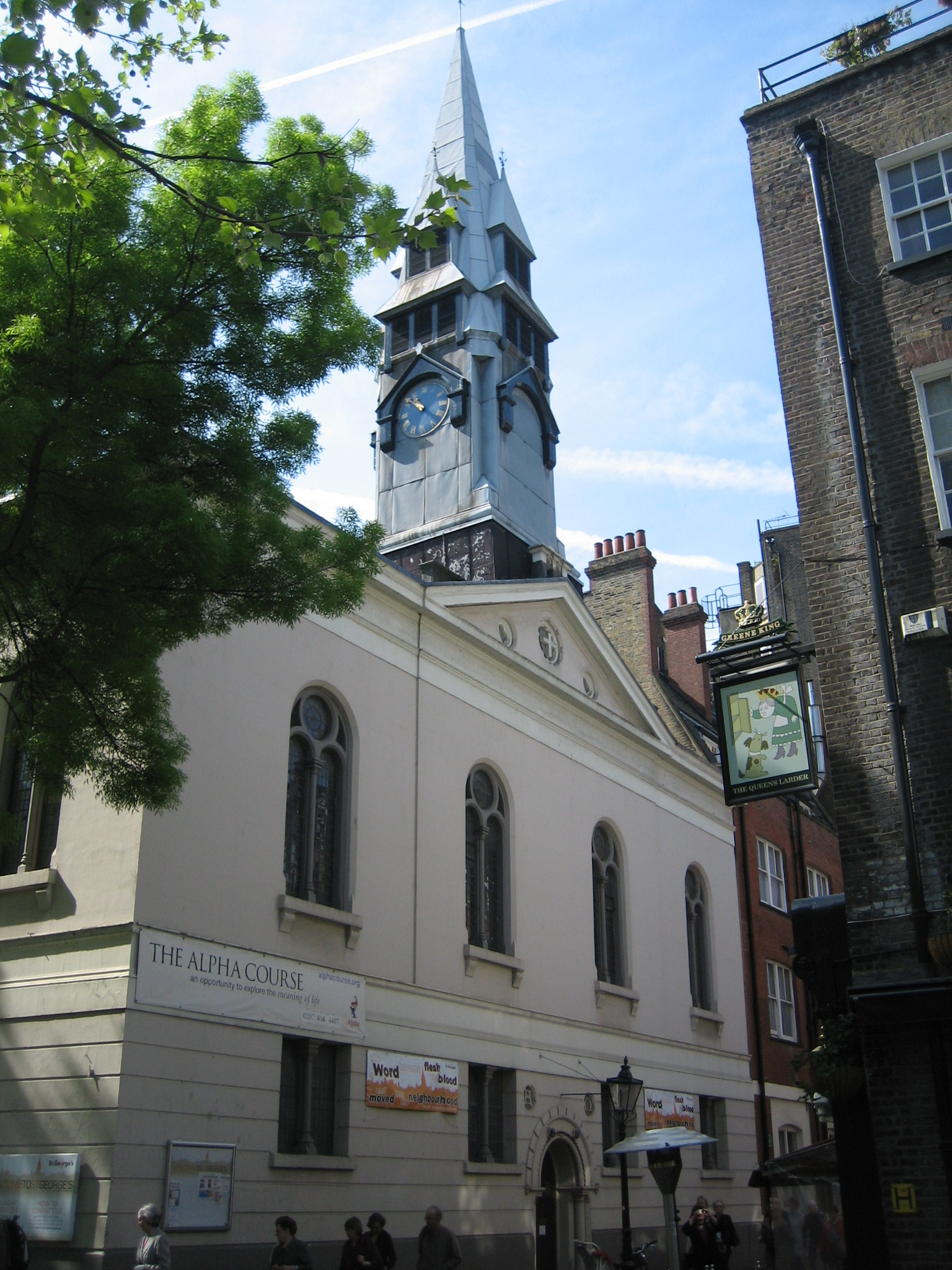
St George the Martyr, Holborn, where Fletcher-Vane married his wife

It is not known when Sir Frederick began an affair with Hannah Bowerbank, a "companion" to Sir Frederick's mother at Hutton in the Forest, according to the memoir of Sir Frederick's grandson, later Sir Francis Patrick Fletcher Vane, 5th Baronet. On 22 August 1794, Hannah Bowerbank gave birth to a daughter, also named Hannah. A son was born on 9 July 1795, Walter Vane, and the "intimacy between Sir Frederick and Hannah continued and they lived together at various places in Cumberland and among others at Broughton Hall in the parish of Bridekirk". The children were baptised on 16 July 1795 at St Mary's Parish Church, Marylebone, London.

Sir Francis describes Hannah Bowerbank as coming from a "good though impoverished family". It is not clear that they were in fact impoverished. The obituary of Hannah Bowerbank's father, John Bowerbank, in the National Register in 1808 describes him as a "most respectable farmer under His Grace the Duke of Norfolk for upwards of 60 years and father of the present Lady Vane of Armathwaite". In fact, John Bowerbank also managed the lands of the Hassells of Dalemain and the Fletcher Vane family at Hutton.

The Bowerbank family had been settled at Johnby in the parish of Greystoke, County Cumberland, for several centuries and had intermarried with some of the leading Cumberland families of the time including the houses of Fetherstonhaugh and Musgrave. The descendants of John Bowerbank (bp. 1598) and Grace Malleson (bp. 1601), John Bowerbank's 2x great grandparents, include George Stanhope, 8th Earl of Chesterfield (1822-1883), Thomas Bowerbank (1686–1768), Barrack Master of Portsmouth, Architect and Overseer of the Ordnance Board who amassed a considerable fortune, and the daughter of Thomas Bowerbank, Catherine "Kitty" Bowerbank (1717–1804), a "lady of merit and fortune", who married Captain Cotton Dent, one of the first Captains of the Royal Greenwich Naval Hospital and scion of the great Dent naval family which included Commander Digby Dent, best man to Lord Nelson at his wedding to Mrs Nisbet on the Island of Nevis. Dent served with Nelson on HMS Boreas. Another kinsman, John Bowerbank, a lieutenant on HMS Bellerephon, accompanied Napoleon to exile on St Helena and he wrote an extant account of his observations during the voyage. The Bowerbank family were also notable in the church and academia, James Scott Bowerbank FRS being another kinsman.

On 9 March 1797, Sir Frederick married Hannah Bowerbank at the church of St George the Martyr, Holborn, London. At this point Hannah was pregnant with a third child, Francis Fletcher Vane, who was born on 29 March 1797; the precise date of the birth would be a future bone of contention, resulting in an unedifying lawsuit initiated by Sir Frederick's youngest son in 1872. After Francis's birth, it appears that for the next four years Sir Frederick and Lady Vane resided at Putney, then in Surrey, and "at other places in or about London".

Sir Frederick's first son, Walter Vane, was educated at Eton from 1805 to 1807 and thereafter at Charterhouse between 1808 and 1809 when the school was based at Smithfield, London. Walter was enlisted as a lieutenant in the 1st Foot Guards on 11 September 1811 and served in the Peninsular Wars fought between Napoleon and the allied forces of Britain, Spain and Portugal to gain control of the Iberian Peninsula. He fought between March 1813 and April 1814 at the battles of Bidassoa, Nivelle, Nive and Adour. Walter Vane attained the rank of captain on 15 March 1814. At the time of Napoleon's capitulation in 1814, shortly before Napoleon's first exile to Elba, Walter Vane was in the camp of the Grenadier Guards at Bayonne. The French General refused to believe that Napoleon could have conceded and the result is best summed up by Walter's nephew:

The British learnt from their ships that Peace had been signed and sent word to the French General at Bayonne that this was so but the latter would not believe it, thinking it a ruse, perfide Albion and all that. But we, knowing the fact, relaxed in military precautions, and I expect had a jollification. Then the French made an effective sortie from the town to the west towards the sea and caught us napping – result, many hundreds of our men killed and thirteen officers. I do not suppose there was any treachery in it, but rather the incredulity of the French.

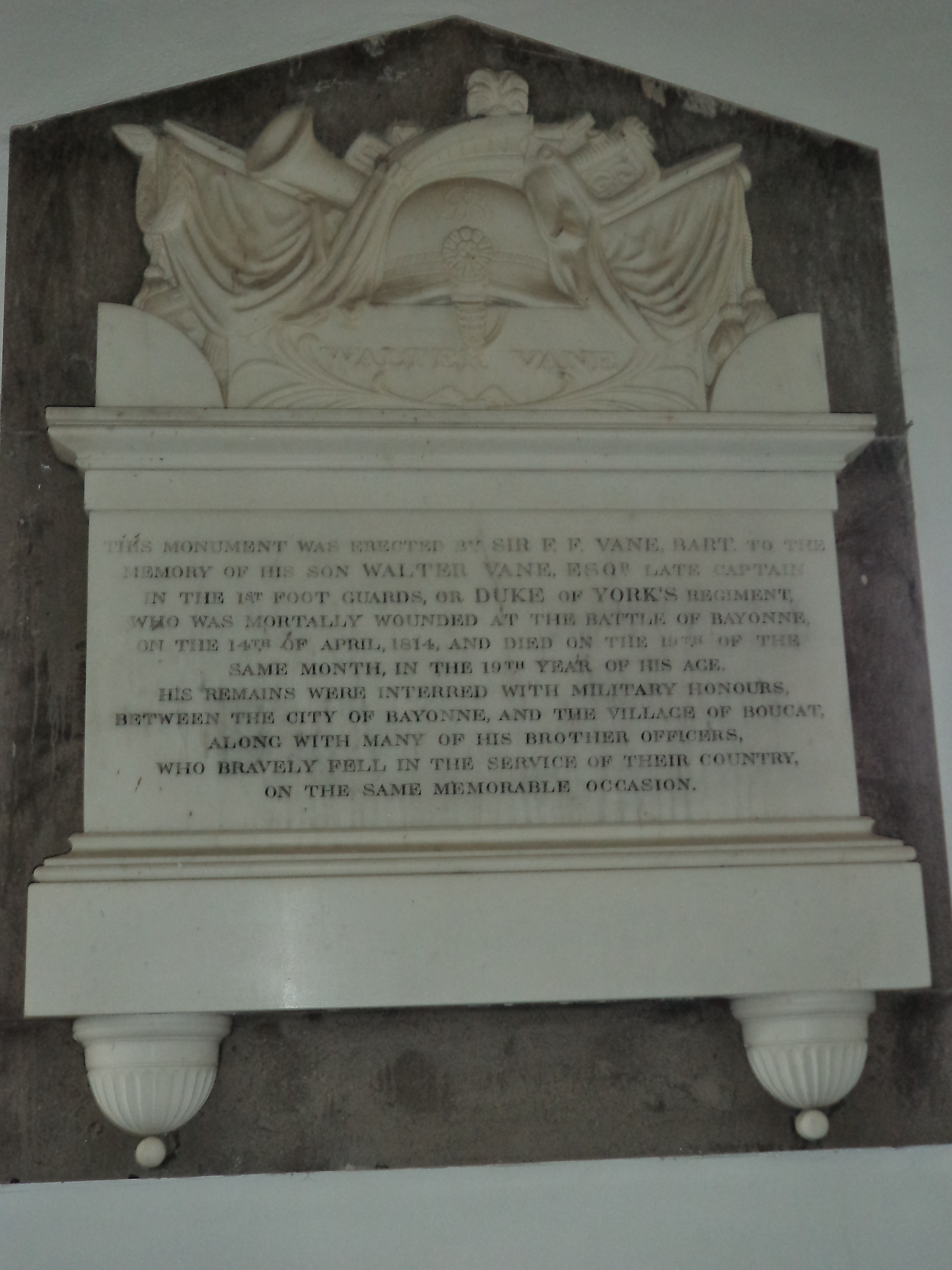
Memorial to Walter at St Bega's Church, Bassenthwaite

During the French sortie at Bayonne, Walter suffered wounds on 14 April 1814 and died shortly thereafter on 20 April 1814. He was nineteen years of age and was buried in one of the Guards' Cemeteries, North West of Bayonne. There are two Guards' Cemeteries at Bayonne, one in the woods next to their original camp and another larger one, where Walter was buried, further North West between Bayonne and Boucau, mainly for officers of the Coldstream Guards; as he was wounded at the original camp of the Grenadier Guards, it is likely he was moved, injured, to his burial place. Walter's extant weathered gravestone is simply inscribed 'W.V.'. Walter Vane is also remembered at the English Church in Biarritz, the first on the list of British Officers killed in the Pyrenees. He was further commemorated on Memorial Panel VII for Bayonne, Royal Military Chapel, Wellington Barracks, London, although this was destroyed by a flying bomb during the Second World War. Sir Frederick himself commissioned a memorial tablet for St Bega's Church, Bassenthwaite, close to Armathwaite Hall, Cumberland:

THIS MONUMENT WAS ERECTED BY SIR F. F. VANE BART. IN THE MEMORY OF HIS SON WALTER VANE ESQ. LATE CAPTAIN IN THE 1ST FOOT GUARDS, OR DUKE OF YORK'S REGIMENT WHO WAS MORTALLY WOUNDED AT THE BATTLE OF BAYONNE ON THE 14TH OF APRIL, 1814 AND DIED ON THE 19TH IN THE SAME MONTH, IN THE 19TH YEAR OF HIS AGE. HIS REMAINS WERE INTERRED WITH MILITARY HONOURS BETWEEN THE CITY OF BAYONNE AND THE VILLAGE OF BOUCAT ALONG WITH MANY OF HIS BROTHER OFFICERS WHO BRAVELY FELL IN THE SERVICE OF THEIR COUNTRY, ON THE SAME MEMORABLE OCCASION

Letters written by Walter to his parents passed to Walter's nephew, Francis:

I have letters from an uncle of mine, who joined as a young officer of the Guards when our troops attacked San Sebastian in Spain. We had then driven the French, with the aid of the Spaniards and the Portuguese, almost out of the two countries. He writes home in these words: "What a dull thing soldiering really is. We fight every month or so, and meantimes we rot".

Queen Victoria visited the cemetery in Bayonne on 20 March 1889 and Edward VII on 20 March 1909. It is not without irony that Walter Vane's kinsman, John Bowerbank, as a lieutenant on HMS Bellerephon, escorted Napoleon to his final exile on St Helena.

Lady Hannah Vane gave birth to a daughter, Sophia Mercy Vane, on 18 March 1802. On 22 March 1802, Sophia was baptised at St Bega's Church, Bassenthwaite. On 1 August 1839, at the age of 37, she married the Reverend Forbes Smith, later Forbes Smith de Heriz, at the Parish Church in Cheltenham, her address stated as Park Place, Cheltenham. The Rev. Forbes Smith was then residing at Wolseley Lodge, Cheltenham and the witnesses were Carlisle Spedding and Sarah Spedding.

Sir Frederick and Lady Vane had a further son, Frederick Henry Vane, born on 10 May 1807 at Armathwaite Hall. He was initially sent to Laleham School, then under the control of Dr Arnold who would later develop the Victorian public school ideal of muscular Christianity while headmaster of Rugby. After prep school, Frederick was sent to Eton, under Dr. Keate, where he was a contemporary of the young Gladstone. Keate was known as the "swishing headmaster" and Frederick was "one of seventy victims" punished for breaking bounds to attend the Windsor Fair. The boys were caned alphabetically and Frederick was thankful that by the time his turn came, the headmaster was losing strength.

In his memoirs, Frederick's son, Francis, describes a scene at Armathwaite when his father, then a boy at Eton:

witnessed a battle which must have been one of the last feudal ones in England. My grandfather owned most of the feudal lands round the lake, but Lord Egremont, who lived at Cockermouth Castle, had some special rights over the water and the foreshore, and desired to build a pier for some purpose or other. This was opposed to my grandfather's wishes as the park of Armathwaire runs down to the lake. In spite of this, Egremont sent a body of workmen from Cockermouth to erect it-and when this was known there was a call to arms of all our tenants and foresters. So rapidly did they mobilise that some of them had not time to put on their boots, but rode to the fray in their stockinged feet. The townsmen were badly beaten by the dalesmen, some thrown into the lake-and the pier was never built.

After Eton, Frederick was commissioned into the 12th Lancers serving with the expeditionary force sent to Portugal in 1827 after which he retired from the Army. He then served in the Consular Service at Rio de Janeiro, Brazil, and at Boston in America. He died in Brighton in December, 1894.

== Resettlement of the Fletcher-Vane estates ==
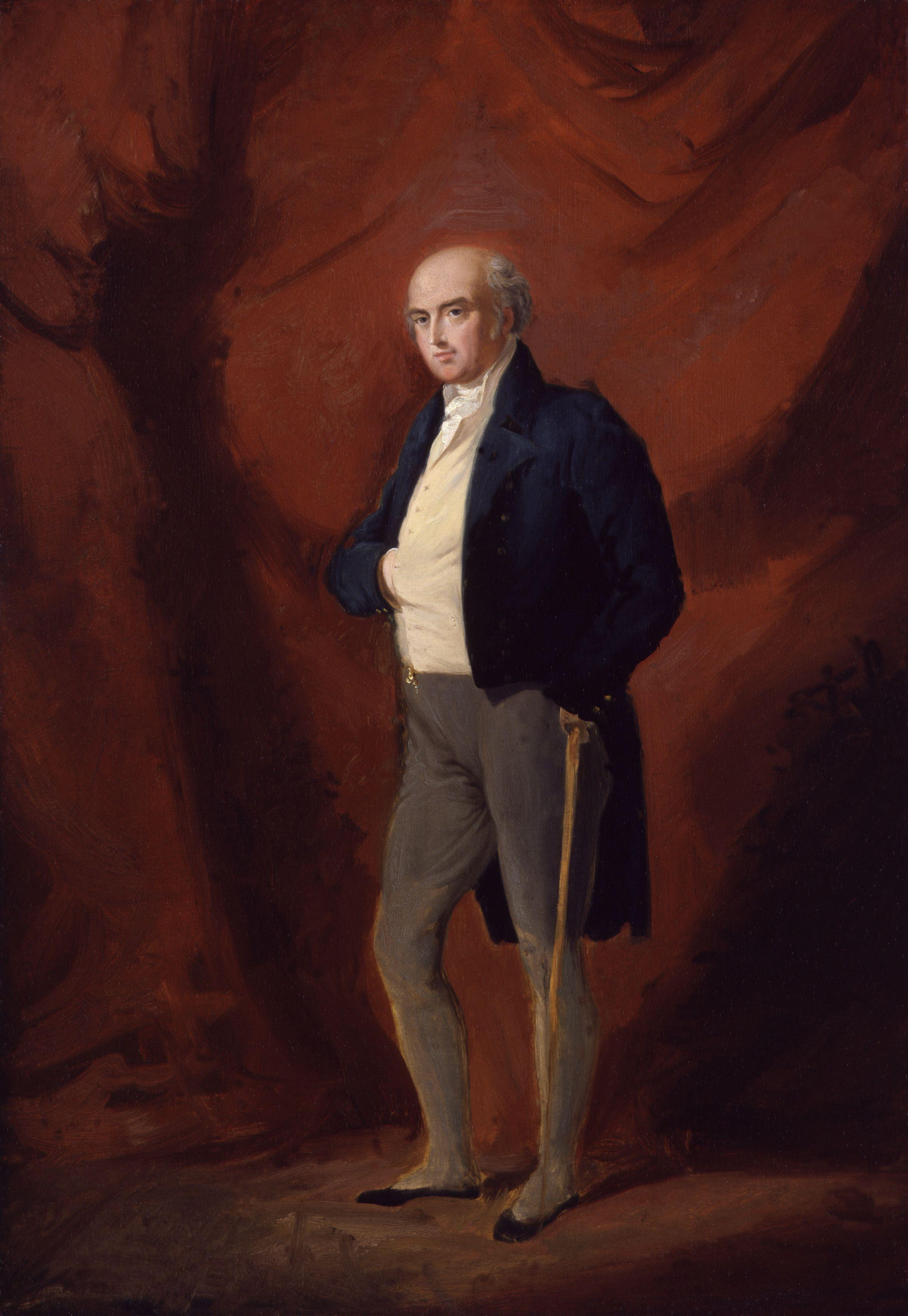
Portrait of Henry Vassall-Fox, 3rd Baron Holland

In anticipation of the marriage of his second son, Francis Fletcher-Vane, to Diana Olivia Beauclerk in 1823, the Fletcher-Vane estates were resettled, the trustees being many of the leading Whig politicians and lawyers of the time:

- Henry Vassall-Fox, 3rd Baron Holland, the nephew of Charles James Fox;
- Sir Philip Musgrave, 8th Baronet, a political ally of Sir Frederick;
- Sir James Graham, 2nd Baronet GCB PC;
- Reverend Fergus Graham;
- Edward Hassell of Dalemain Castle who married Julia Musgrave, daughter of Sir Philip Musgrave, Bart;
- Charles Smallwood-Fetherstonhaugh (d. 7 March 1839), son of the Rev. Charles Smallwood, Vicar of Kirkoswald by the sister of Timothy Fethersonthaugh who died in 1797. Charles Smallwood assumed the additional surname of Fetherstonhaugh when he inherited the Kirkoswald College estate;
- Harry Powlett, 4th Duke of Cleveland KG (19 April 1803 – 21 August 1891);
- Charles Robert Beauclerk (6 January 1802 – 22 February 1872), brother of Diana Beauclerk (who married Sir Francis Vane, 3rd Bt), a Barrister at Lincoln's Inn and a Senior Fellow of Gonville and Caius College, Cambridge. He was married to Joaquina, second daughter of H.E. Don Jose M. de Zamora, Chief Magistrate of Cuba;
- Philip Henry Howard (22 April 1801 – 1 January 1883), a Whig politician; and
- Robert Percy Smith, known as "Bobus" Smith (7 May 1770 – 10 March 1845), a British lawyer, MP, and Judge Advocate-General of Bengal, India.

In reference to the marriage, Sir Frederick reputedly spoke of the Beauclerk family as a very good one (descending from Charles II), before commenting: "Yes; there is plenty of blood, but no groats".

== Hunting ==
Sir Frederick kept a pack of hounds at his Wythop Estate close to Armathwaite Hall. In 1829 he employed John Peel, the celebrated huntsman, under whom Sir Frederick's pack had one of the longest chases ever recorded, reputedly covering 70 miles. After the event Sir Frederick commissioned a portrait of John Peel.

== Death ==
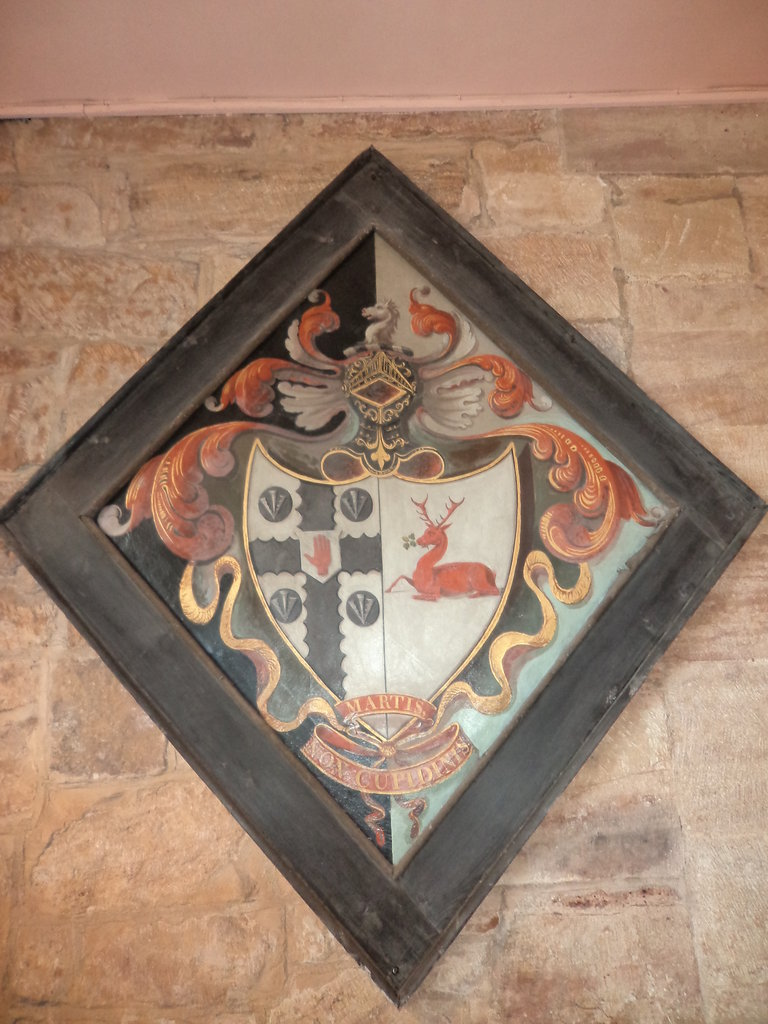
Funerary hatchment of Fletcher-Vane (displaying the arms of Fletcher, left), and Lady Hannah Fletcher-Vane (née Bowerbank, arms of Bowerbank right), painted in c. 1832 on the death of Sir Frederick, c.1832

Sir Frederick died on 26 February 1832. One account of Sir Frederick appeared in an American newspaper in 1873 describing him as:

a rather wild and lavish but well-esteemed country gentleman, who made little mark in the world, and was chiefly known in London as a good-hearted fellow, fond of truly British sport, and of the fashionable distractions of the day.

Sir Frederick was buried at St Bega's, Bassenthwaite. His tomb was commissioned by his first daughter, Hannah, who died in 1854, and was buried in the same vault: "On the 3d inst., at Arundel Lodge, the Park, Cheltenham, Hannah, eldest daughter of the late Sir Frederick Fletcher Vane, Bart, of Hutton Hall, and Armathwaite, Cumberland. Her remains were deposited in the family vault at Bassenthwaite Church, near Keswick, on Tuesday last". The Dowager Lady Vane died in 1866, in Cheltenham, and the news of her death even reached journalists at The Louisville Daily Courier. A more detailed obituary appeared in The Carlisle Journal after her burial at St Bega's Church, Bassenthwaite:

DOWAGER LADY VANE – We have to announce the death of Hannah, Dowager Lady Vane, which occurred on Monday last, at Cheltenham, at the advanced age of 93. The deceased lady was born in 1773, and married, 9th March, 1797, Sir Frederick Fletcher Vane, Bart., who died in March 1832. She was the daughter of Mr. John Bowerbank, of Johnby, Cumberland, and grandmother of the present Sir Henry Ralph Fletcher Vane, Bart. On Friday the remains of the venerable lady were brought by rail from Cheltenham to the Keswick station. A hearse from Whitehaven was in waiting at the Keswick Hotel to receive the body. About 10 o'clock the funeral cortege, comprehending three coaches, in which were Sir Henry Vane and other members of the family, and friends of the deceased, started for Bassenthwaite, where the interment took place. On their return the mourners dined at the Keswick Hotel.

Obituaries of the Dowager Lady Vane also appeared in The Illustrated London News, and The Cheltenham Looker-On.

Parliament of Great Britain
Preceded by Viscount Barnard; Richard Barwell	Member of Parliament for Winchelsea; 1792–1794; With: Richard Barwell	Succeeded by Richard Barwell; John Hiley Addington
Preceded by Wilson Gale-Braddyll; John Christian Curwen	Member of Parliament for Carlisle; 1796–1800; With: John Christian Curwen	Succeeded by Parliament of the United Kingdom
Parliament of the United Kingdom
Preceded by Parliament of Great Britain	Member of Parliament for Carlisle; 1801–1802; With: John Christian Curwen	Succeeded by Walter Spencer-Stanhope; John Christian Curwen
Preceded by William Moffat; Robert Ladbroke	Member of Parliament for Winchelsea; 1806–1807; With: Calverley Bewicke	Succeeded by Sir Oswald Mosley, Bt; Calverley Bewicke
Baronetage of Great Britain
Preceded by Lionel Vane-Fletcher	Baronet (of Hutton in the County of Cumberland); 1786-1832	Succeeded by Francis Fletcher-Vane
