= Francis Fletcher-Vane =

Francis Fletcher-Vane may refer to:

- Sir Francis Fletcher-Vane, 3rd Baronet, British landowner and aristocrat
- Sir Francis Fletcher-Vane, 5th Baronet, Irish-born British military officer and aristocrat
