= Boustead =

Boustead may refer to the following:

- Boustead & Co, a London merchant banking business
- Boustead Singapore, a Singapore engineering company
- Boustead Group, a Malaysian company
- Boustead Hill, an English village
- Boustead Cup, an annual English rowing race
- Boustead (surname)
