= Sir Lionel Vane-Fletcher, 1st Baronet =

British landowner

Sir Lionel Vane-Fletcher Bt
- Born: Lionel Wright Vane; 28 June 1723; Rotterdam, Dutch Republic
- Died: 27 June 1786 (aged 62); England

Sir Lionel Wright Vane-Fletcher, 1st Baronet (born Lionel Wright Vane; 28 June 1723 – 19 July 1786) was a British landowner. The son of a successful merchant in London and Rotterdam, he was the owner of a large estate in Cumberland. He was created a baronet, of Hutton in the County of Cumberland, on 27 June 1786. According to the literature of his ancestral seat, Hutton in the Forest, Lionel was a friend of John Howard, the prison reformer, and was made a baronet "through the influence" of his cousin, Henry Vane, 2nd Earl of Darlington, who made the request to William Pitt the Younger. The baronetcy was then created by George III.

== Life ==
Lionel was born in Rotterdam on 28 June 1723, the son of Walter Vane, a successful merchant in London and Rotterdam. Walter Vane died in March 1755 at Wanstead in Essex. He had married firstly Mercy Wright, daughter of Samuel Wright of Wanstead, but she died in July 1723, shortly after giving birth to Lionel. Walter married secondly Mary Anne Woodward, daughter and heiress of Godfrey Woodward of Putney, Surrey, the marriage being clandestine and taking place at the Fleet Prison on 14 January 1728. Mary Anne died in London in 1756 and was buried at Wanstead. By his first wife, Walter's son and heir was Lionel. At some time, the family name was changed to Vane-Fletcher.

In August 1758, Lionel married Rachel Griffith, daughter of David Griffith of Llankennen, Carmarthenshire, at St Andrew's Church, Holborn. By Rachel, he had five children: Frederick, his successor; Walter, who died without issue; Henry, who died young; Catherine, who died unmarried in Brighton on 7 January 1844; and Rachel, who, in 1792, married William Walter Vane Esq. of the Coldstream Guards.

In 1778, Vane-Fletcher experienced a most unfortunate episode:

Whereas a Brown Bay Gelding, aged five years, fifteen hands and an half high, with a black mane and nag tail never nicked, a final white strip on his nose, was feloniously taken and rode away from Hutton Hall, in Cumberland, on the 13th of May instant, by WILLIAM JACKSON, servant to Lionel Wright Fletcher Esq. who took away with him at the same time 3000l. in cash, and about 1000l. in Newcastle Bank Bills &c. Whoever will apprehend the said William Jackson, or give such Notice to the above Office, or to any magistrate in this kingdom, as may be the means of him being apprehended, shall receive Fifty Pounds reward from the said Lionel Wright Fletcher, Esq. on his commitment, and Fifty Pounds more on his conviction

Vane-Fletcher was created a baronet on 27 June 1786. According to the literature of his ancestral seat, Hutton in the Forest, he was a friend of John Howard, the prison reformer, and was made a baronet "through the influence" of his cousin, Henry Vane, 2nd Earl of Darlington.

Sir Lionel died on 19 July 1786. His son Frederick succeeded him as the second baronet, and changed his surname to Fletcher-Vane in 1790.

Baronetage of Great Britain
New creation	Baronet of Hutton; 1786	Succeeded by Frederick Fletcher-Vane
