= Sir Henry Ralph Fletcher-Vane, 4th Baronet =

Sir Henry Ralph Fletcher-Vane 4th Baronet
- Born: 13 January 1830; Hutton in the Forest, England
- Died: 1908 (aged 77–78); Hutton in the Forest, England
- Education: Eton College; Christ Church, Oxford
- Relatives: Ancestor: Sir Henry Vane the Elder

Sir Henry Ralph Fletcher-Vane (13 January 1830 – 1908) was the eldest son of Sir Francis Fletcher-Vane, 3rd Baronet, and his wife, Diana Olivia (née Beauclerk). He was a Deputy Lieutenant and Justice of the Peace for Westmoreland and Cumberland and appointed High Sheriff of Cumberland in 1856. He was also a County Alderman for Cumberland and was an officer in the Westmorland and Cumberland Yeomanry, commanding the regiment from 1879 until 1891 when he was appointed the regiment's Honorary Colonel. He was the fourth Baronet of Hutton and the first cousin of Sir Francis Vane.

== Life ==
Henry Ralph Fletcher-Vane was born on 13 January 1830, educated at Eton and Christ Church, Oxford, and succeeded his father to the baronetcy in 1842 at the age of 12. In 1852 it was rumoured that Sir Henry was amorously involved with Isabella Henrietta Theodora Long, the granddaughter of Horatio Walpole, 2nd Earl of Orford:

It is stated that a marriage is on the tapis between Sir Harry Vane, Bart., of Hutton hall and Armathwaite, Cumberland, and Isabella Henrietta Theodora, youngest daughter of Henry Lawes Long, Esq., of Hampton Lodge, Surrey, and the Lady Catherine Long.

In 1871, at the age of 41, Sir Henry married Margaret Maxwell Gladstone at Glencairn in Dumfries, Scotland. Margaret was the daughter of Thomas Steuart Gladstone, of Capenoch, co. Dumfries; Thomas Gladstone was the eldest son of the Liverpool based merchant and plantation owner, Robert Gladstone, and his wife, Catherine (née Steuart); he was also the first cousin of William Ewart Gladstone, the Liberal Prime Minister who was a contemporary of Sir Henry's uncle at Eton. In 1835, Thomas and two of his brothers, Robert and William, became the trustees and executors of their father's will and guardians of their younger siblings. He was responsible for managing the Jamaican properties and plantations and for dividing the estate equally between the siblings. In his own right, Thomas Gladstone was a merchant and broker in the Liverpool firm of Gladstone and Sergeantson through which he expanded his commercial interests into South American guano, Australian farming as well as trade with Asia. In later life he retired to Capenoch house, Dumfriesshire. His younger brother Adam Steuart Gladstone became an East India merchant.

In 1872, shortly after his marriage, Sir Henry Ralph Fletcher-Vane was embroiled in unpleasant litigation. The litigation was initiated by his uncle, Frederick Henry Vane, the youngest son of his grandfather, Sir Frederick Fletcher-Vane, 2nd Baronet. Ironically, Sir Henry may have met his wife through the introduction of Frederick Henry-Vane, who had been at Eton with William Ewart Gladstone. An account of the beginning of this dispute is contained in the memoirs of Sir Frederick son, Sir Francis Patrick Fletcher-Vane, later 5th Baronet:

Somewhere in the later "sixties arose the family dispute which, owing to the bad advice of the lawyers on both sides, caused my father and his nephew, Sir Henry, to enter into a trial lasting many years. Without hesitation it can be said that unnecessary and extremely expensive litigation has been the curse of my life, my "thorn in the flesh". To this day, in 1928, I suffer from the effects of this lawyer-made dispute. The two were honourable gentlemen, my father and my cousin, [and] would never have come to legal blows had they not been egged on by their respective solicitors, both of whom eventually committed suicide after it having been proved that they had defrauded widows and orphans".

The litigation was first reported in The Times on 6 November 1872. The spoils at stake were the family estates in Cumberland and Westmorland. The case made by the bill was that Sir Francis Fletcher-Vane, 3rd Baronet, had been born out of wedlock. There are two accounts of this circumstance of his birth. In The Times:

It was upon the legitimacy of the third of these children that the question turned. The plaintiff alleged that pending arrangements for his father's marriage with Miss Bowerbank, she was prematurely confined of a third child, a son, and that the marriage did not in fact take place until nearly three weeks after her confinement – viz., on march 9, 1797. The child thus born, as the plaintiff alleged about three weeks before the marriage on the 9th of March, was baptised by the name of Francis Fletcher-Vane at St. George's, Bloomsbury, on the 19th of April, 1797, and in the entry of his baptism he was stated to have been born on the 29th of March 1797. As to this entry, it was alleged by the plaintiff [Frederick Henry Vane] that the register had been tampered with and that the date of the birth was added some time after the original entry. The bill then stated that Sir Frederick Fletcher-Vane brought up Francis Fletcher-Vane, the child thus born, as his legitimate heir. After the marriage two other children were born – i.e., a daughter, and the plaintiff, who was born on May 10, 1807. Francis Fletcher-Vane married in 1823, and upon the death of his father in 1832 assumed the title and the family estates.

In his memoirs, Sir Francis (5th Bt) provides a more fanciful account of the birth of his uncle, Sir Francis (3rd Bt):

When the third [child of Sir Frederick and Hannah Bowerbank] was about to be born, Sir Frederick repented and decided to marry his mistress, and not wishing to have this ceremony performed in Cumberland, took her up to London. On Bushey Heath they were attacked by highwaymen, he shot one of them, the others flying-but the result of this shock caused premature confinement, which happened at the house of a doctor at Watford.

The above account is not corroborated by any of the extant law reports of the trial.

In the 1881 census, Sir Henry and his wife were living at 35 Cadogan Place in Chelsea, London, where he describes his occupation as magistrate, and in the 1891 census he was living in Brighton. Debrett's Baronetage of 1905 states Sir Henry's seats as Hutton in the Forest and Scarness Cottage in Bassenthwaite. He was by then a member of the Carlton Club and Arthur's.

Sir Henry Ralph Vane died at Hutton in the Forest on 15 June 1908 and probate was granted in Carlisle on 7 August 1908 to the Right Honourable Henry Vane, Baron Barnard, the Hon. William Lyonel Vane and Edward Lamb Waugh. Sir Henry's effects were valued at £107,747 or £11,662,072 in 2015 prices.

The executors of the estate were as follows: • The Rt. Hon. Henry de Vere Vane, 9th Baron Barnard (10 May 1854 – 28 December 1918), the son of Sir Henry Morgan Vane and Louisa, youngest daughter of the Rev. Richard Farrer of Ashley, Northamptonshire; • The Hon. William Lyonel Vane, brother of the Rt. Hon. Henry de Vere Vane, 9th Baron Barnard (born 30 August 1859); and • Edward Lamb Waugh (born 14 August 1851 at Cockermouth in Cumberland), the eldest son of Edward Waugh, a solicitor, and Mary Jane Waugh.

At the time of Sir Henry's death in 1908, the heir to the baronetcy was his first cousin, Francis Patrick Fletcher-Vane, born 1861, a grandson of Sir Frederick Fletcher-Vane, 2nd Baronet, by Sir Frederick's youngest son, Frederick Henry Vane. The litigation challenging Sir Henry Ralph Vane's legitimacy to the Hutton estates was conducted in the 1870s and was prosecuted by Francis's father. At that time, it is not clear to what extent the litigation would cost Francis his inheritance. Certainly, the literature of Hutton in the Forest makes no mention of Sir Francis Patrick Fletcher-Vane, 5th Baronet. An article in The Times dated 10 October 1912 states the following:

The debtor [Sir Francis Fletcher Vane] was also entitled, in the discretion of the trustees of the will of the late Sir Henry Ralph Vane, and upon the death of the Dowager Lady Vane and of Colonel Wing, a nephew of the testator, to a life interest, not exceeding £500 a year, charged upon the Vane estates; and, under the resettlement of the estates in 1907, to a life interest in reversion in the whole of the income contingent upon his surviving the Dowager Lady Vane and Colonel Wing.

Sir Francis Fletcher-Vane did survive the Dowager Lady Vane (widow of the 4th Baronet), who died at Scarness Cottage in Bassenthwaite in 1916, and he survived Major-General Frederick Drummond Vincent Wing CB, who was killed in action during the First World War in 1915. In terms of the executors, Edward Lamb Waugh died on 27 October 1917, Henry de Vere Vane died on 28 December 1918 and William Lyonel Vane died on 23 January 1920. In 1931, the Hutton estates were gifted to William Fletcher-Vane, 1st Baron Inglewood, three years before the death of Sir Francis Patrick Fletcher-Vane, 5th Bt.

Baronetage of Great Britain
Preceded by Francis Fletcher-Vane	Baronet of Hutton in the County of Cumberland; 1842–1908	Succeeded by Francis Fletcher-Vane
