= King of Clubs (Whig club) =

Whig conversation club founded in 1798

Coordinates: 51°30′44.79″N 0°6′50.78″W

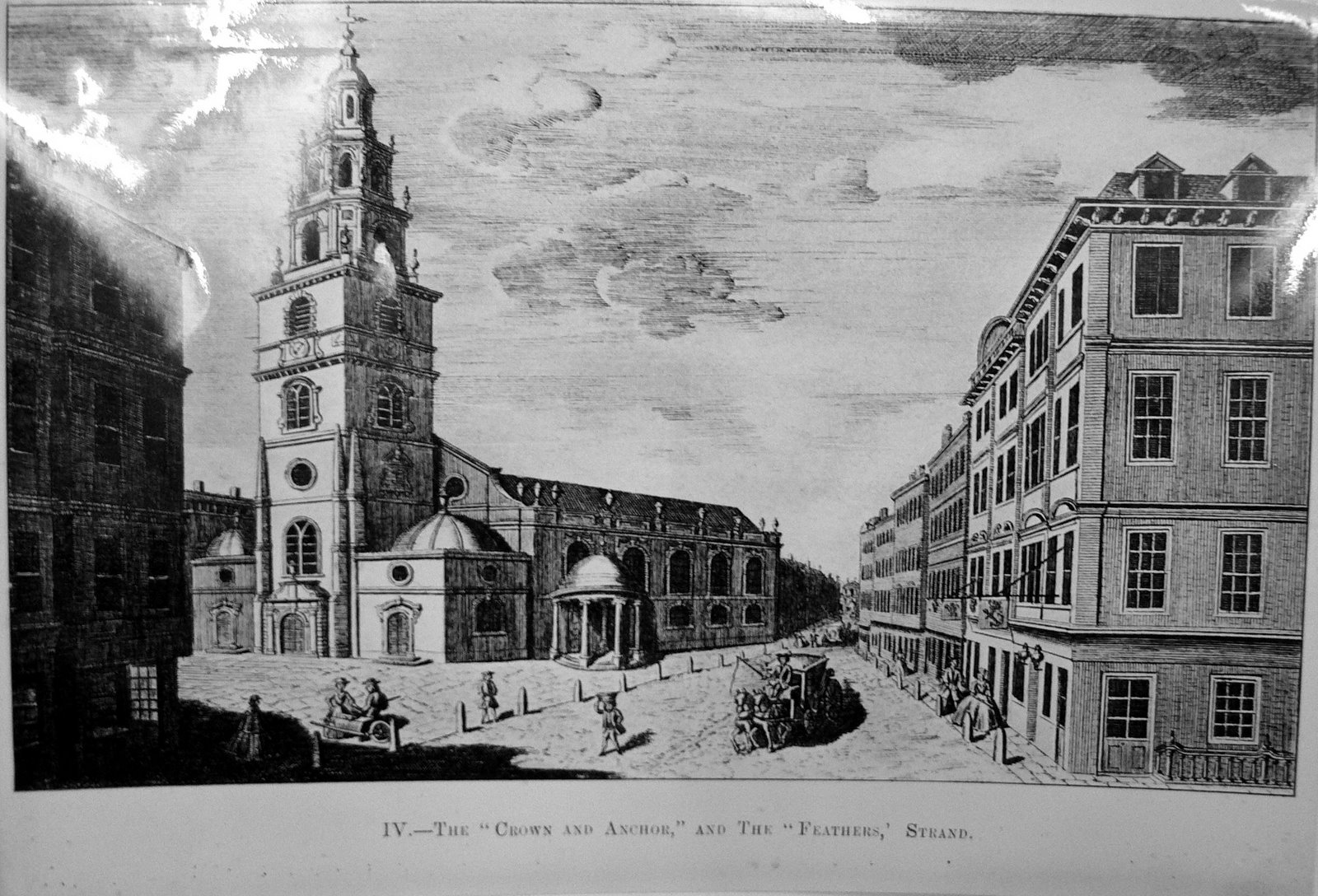
The Crown and Anchor public house (right)

The King of Clubs was a famous Whig conversation club, founded in 1798. In contrast to its mainly Tory forerunner The Club (established by Samuel Johnson, Edmund Burke and Sir Joshua Reynolds), it was a predominantly Whig fraternity of some of the most brilliant minds of the day. The club met at the Crown and Anchor on Arundel Street off the Strand, in London.

== Membership ==
The original inspiration for its formation came from the Rev. Sydney Smith's older brother, Robert - nicknamed "Bobus" after gaining the reputation at Eton for being such a clever Latin "versifier". The founding members were a group of friends who first met at the house of James Mackintosh in February, 1798. As well as Mackintosh, the group comprised Samuel Rogers, James Scarlett, 1st Baron Abinger, Richard "Conversation" Sharp, the historian John Allen and Robert Smith and by 1801 what had started as a small clique of friends had become a properly constituted club comprising the following members,

- Richard Porson
- Smithson Tennant
- John Courtney
- Bryan Edwards
- "Bobus" Smith
- Jo. Richardson
- John Allen
- Samuel Rogers
- Charles Butler
- Richard Sharp
- James Scarlett, 1st Baron Abinger
- James Mackintosh
- William Dickinson
- John Whishaw
- Josiah Wedgwood II
- Pierre Etienne Louis Dumont
- Henry Vassall-Fox, 3rd Baron Holland
- Sir Frederick Fletcher-Vane, 2nd Baronet
- John Duthy, Clerk of the Peace in Winchester, resided in Ropley

Within seven years the club expanded to include such additional illustrious names as

- Thomas Moore
- John Wedgwood
- Henry Brougham
- Thomas Creevey
- William Smith
- Lord Petty
- George Philips
- Francis Horner
- Rev. Peter Elmsley
- Samuel Romilly
- John Ward, 1st Earl of Dudley
- Rev. Sydney Smith
- John Hoppner
- Samuel Boddington

The King of Clubs had by now become well known throughout London as an exclusive Whig dining club where erudite conversation on all matters pertaining to books, authors and literature took place, but where the discussion of politics was positively excluded. Tom Campbell described the club as "a gathering-place of brilliant talkers, dedicated to the meetings of the reigning wits of London". The annual subscription had originally been set at 2 guineas but this was reduced to £2 in 1804, raised to 3 guineas in 1808, and finally fixed at £3 in 1810. As a dining club, an additional charge of 10 shillings and 6 pence was made for dinner, a considerable sum in those days, and princely suppers were held in Harley Street and later at the Crown and Anchor, Arundel Street, in the Strand. The Crown and Anchor was the very inn where Samuel Johnson and James Boswell had once enjoyed supping together; and it was especially popular among the Whigs after it had hosted a great banquet in honour of Fox's birthday in 1798, when an enormous crowd of 2000 Reformers had toasted The People – the Source of Power!

Such was the popularity of the King of Clubs, and so sought after did membership become, that in 1808 a decision was taken to limit membership to a maximum of thirty people who were resident in England. By this time the membership had gained:

- Lord Melbourne
- Earl Cowper
- William Blake
- Abercromby (Lord Dunfermline)
- Alexander Baring, 1st Baron Ashburton
- Charles Kinnaird, 8th Lord Kinnaird
- Henry Luttrell
- R.P. Knight
- Thomas Malthus
- Lord John Townshend MP
- John Fleming
- John Playfair
- George Lamb
- Lord King
- Henry Hallam
- David Ricardo
- Lord Thomas Denman, 1st Baron Denman

In 1803 Bobus Smith, the originator of the club, accepted a seven-year posting in India as Advocate General of Bengal. His move abroad was a great loss to the King of Clubs and while he was away he asked Richard Sharp to perform a number of duties for him:

"...for I bear you the warmest and most sincere regard, and look upon your friendship as one of the greatest pleasures, past and to come, which has fallen in my way these many years."

Sydney Smith came to London and took his brother's place at the club in 1803/4, having previously worked with Francis Jeffrey and Henry Brougham on the Edinburgh Review, a renowned Whig literary magazine, which, with Allen, he had helped to initiate. When he arrived in the city, the irrepressible Sydney formed an immediate attachment to the King of Clubs and his unique sense of humour quickly endeared him to other members and gave meetings an added piquancy. The club lost another of its original members when Sir James Mackintosh, recently knighted, accepted the post of Recordership of Bombay in 1804 and followed in Bobus's footsteps.

A record book of the King of Clubs has been preserved and a typical meeting of about this time (1804) lists the following members in attendance:

- Richard Porson
- Richard Sharp
- James Scarlett
- Sir James Mackintosh
- Rev. Sydney Smith
- Samuel Boddington
- Hon. William Drummond
- George Philips Manchester
- Henry Luttrell
- David Ricardo
- Charles Kinnaird, 8th Lord Kinnaird Lower Grosvenor St

== Meetings ==
Meetings of the King of Clubs did not always take place at the Crown and Anchor, and after 1819 they were held at the Freemasons' Tavern, at Grillions in Albemarle Street, and latterly at the Clarendon Hotel. A surviving account from one of the club's early meetings shows that a dinner for twelve members cost a £24, which included two bottles of Madeira, three bottles of Sherry, two bottles of Port and three bottles of Claret. Despite such unashamed conviviality there is no evidence that alcohol in any way impeded the flow or the quality of the conversation that took place, and we may imagine that the reverse was probably the case since the atmosphere was always a happy blend of the jovial and the serious. It was expected that members should give time to the preparation of their bon-mots, witticisms and anecdotes so that in due course these could be woven into the discussion as productively and effectively as possible. Peter William Clayden recalls how on one occasion Sharp, in fun, chanced upon Boddington's notes before a meeting, made a mental note of all his stories and brought them into the conversation before Boddington could relate them himself.

The preparation that members were expected to undertake before attending meetings of the King of Clubs does not seem to have spoiled either the spontaneity of what occurred or the enjoyment of those who attended. Yet when Francis Horner had his first experience of the club, on 10 April 1802, he gained a very mixed impression, finding the conversation less animated than he had anticipated but attributing this to the absence of Sydney Smith:

"This day I dined at the King of Clubs which meets monthly at the Crown and Anchor in the Strand. The company consisted of Mackintosh, Romilly, Whishaw, Abercromby, Sharp, Scarlett, etc. Smith is not yet come to town. The conversation was very pleasing. It consisted chiefly of literary reminiscences, anecdotes of authors, criticisms of books, etc. I had been taught to expect a very different scene – a display of argument, wit and all the flourishes of intellectual gladiatorship, which though less permanently pleasing, is for the time more striking. This expectation was not answered, partly, as I am given to understand, from the absence of Smith, and partly from the presence of Romilly, who evidently received from all an unaffected deference and imposed a certain degree of restraint."

Horner regretted that there was no discussion of political ideas and complained that Sharp and Mackintosh seemed to be too much in agreement with one another, "as if they belonged to a kind of sect". In a sense this remark was quite true, but Horner was quite happy to become a member of the sect himself that year and Clayden confirms that by 1804 Mackintosh and Sydney Smith had established "a kind of society" which still held parties "once or twice every week" in their own homes. In effect these were a continuation of the informal meetings which had started in 1798 and which Horner was now happy to attend. As far as the more formal meetings of the club were concerned there was broad agreement by members that James Mackintosh and Sydney Smith were the most brilliant contributors. Tom Moore felt that certain of the group, Mackintosh included, invested so much of their time and energy in club proceedings that their literary and professional careers suffered as a direct consequence, but whatever the risks, the King of Clubs enjoyed immense status as a place where superb conversation might be found and accordingly membership became more keenly sought than ever. In 1809, and mindful of those times when he had been in financial straits, Sydney Smith wrote dryly to Lady Holland:

"...we have admitted a Mr Baring, importer and writer, into the King of Clubs, upon the express promise that he lends £50 to any member of the club when applied to. I proposed this amendment to his introduction which was agreed to without a dissenting voice."

Smith added pointedly:

"I wish you would speak to [Samuel] Romilly about the levity and impropriety of his conversation – he is becoming an absolute rake and Ward and I talk of leaving the Club if a more chaste line of dialogue is not adhered to."

At one stage it was proposed by Mackintosh that the conversation and witticisms of their meetings should be recorded in a literary magazine, to be called The Bachelor. It was felt that there existed more than sufficient material to support a twice-weekly publication, but although the idea had the support of Rogers, Robert Smith, Scarlett and Sharp, the project never materialised. Consequently, though the Club's meetings spanned a quarter of a century, few details have survived of the bonhomie, the magic and the sparkling conversation that went on at them. The reason for the final demise of the club is not known but the poet Thomas Campbell became a frequent guest and in the following letter to a friend he reflects on some of the reasons why he himself gradually became disenchanted:

"Much of the art and erudition of these men please an auditor at the first and second visit; the trial of minds becomes at last fatiguing because it is unnatural and unsatisfactory. Every one of these brilliants goes there to shine, for conversational powers are so much the rage in London that no reputation is higher than his who exhibits them to advantage. Where everyone tries to instruct there is, in fact, but little instruction. Wit, paradox, eccentricities, even absurdity, if delivered rapidly and facetiously, takes priority in these societies of sound reason and delicate taste. I have watched sometimes the devious tide of conversation guided by accidental associations turning from topic to topic and satisfactory upon none. What has one learned? – has been my general question. The mind it is true is electrified and quickened, and the spirits are fiercely exhilarated, but grand fault pervades the whole institution – their enquiries are desultory, and all improvements to be reaped must be accidental."

== Ending ==
As a creative phenomenon perhaps it was inevitable that the King of Clubs should enjoy an initial period of rapid growth, reach a high point of maturity, and then suffer a final decline. Perhaps the appeal of such a club went out of fashion, or perhaps more likely it simply outgrew itself and became a victim of its own success. As more and more people with diverse personalities and different conversational skills became members, the dynamics of the group must inevitably have changed and in Campbell's view the club was ultimately consumed in the heat of its own incandescence. But as it came towards its end, the final glowing embers were not easily extinguished in the hearts of members and many warm memories were kept alive. A good number of those who had attended meetings for much of their lives would reflect nostalgically in old age on what wonderfully pleasurable times had been spent at the club. Richard Sharp summed up the sentiment at the very end of his life, when he wrote to Scarlett on 13 November 1834:

"Ah yes! – our King of Club days with Mackintosh, Bobus, Dumont and Romilly, were days that the Gods might envy!"
