= Bowstead =

Bowstead is a surname. Notable people with the surname include:

- James Bowstead (1801–1843), Anglican cleric, Bishop of Sodor and Man
- John Bowstead (1940–2020), English artist and lyricist
- John Bowstead (cricketer) (1872–1939), English cricketer
