= John Whishaw =

John Whishaw (1764 – 21 December 1840) was an English lawyer. He became a Commissioner of Audit, and a leader of Whig society, known as "the Pope of Holland House".

== Life ==
He was son of Hugh Whishaw of Macclesfield. Educated at Macclesfield Grammar School, he matriculated at Trinity College, Cambridge in 1783, graduating B.A. in 1788 and M.A. in 1792. While a student he lost a leg, disqualifying him for an intended career in the Church of England. In 1789 he entered Gray's Inn; in 1794 he moved to Lincoln's Inn, and was called to the bar. He became an equity draughtsman, living on New Square, and in time next to Francis Horner, whom he met in 1802 through James Abercromby.

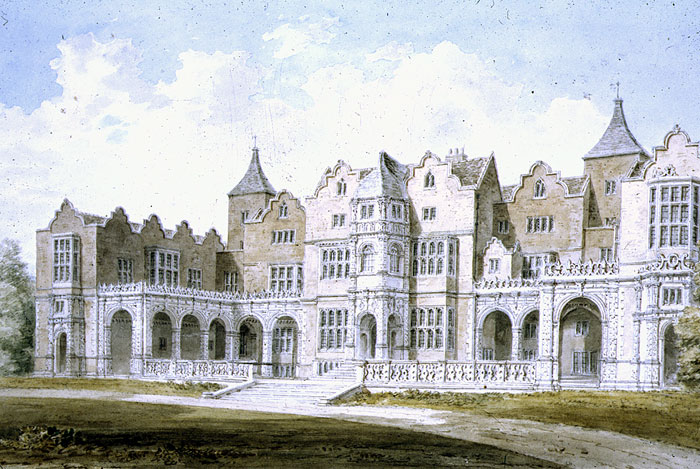
Holland House, 1812, John Buckler

By 1799, shortly after it was founded, Whishaw belonged to the King of Clubs, the Whig social nexus set up by Bobus Smith. He became close to the Fox family of Holland House. Described as "ponderous" and "inscrutable", he was a pundit on behalf of the "Holland House set", even "dictator of Holland House opinions", and so acquired his nickname. Thomas Creevey, who counted Whishaw as a close friend, wrote in 1809 that he practically lived at Holland House. John Sterling called him a "damned old humbug". Around 1830 Anna Letitia Le Breton described the short, stout Whishaw, with cork leg, as "very lame, and with rather a surly manner".

Whishaw obtained his post as Commissioner of Audit in 1806, though Lord Henry Petty. When Jeremy Bentham was in dispute with the government over his Panopticon, he choose Whishaw as his arbitrator. With John Hullock, Whishaw came to a decision on an award on 9 July 1813. He was executor to Sir Samuel Romilly, and acted as guardian to his children.

Whishaw was a Fellow of the Royal Society, and Fellow of the Society of Antiquaries of London. He was a member of the Geological Society. At the end of 1825 he was on the first council of London University.

== Works ==
Whishaw was secretary of the African Institution, and the biographer of Mungo Park. In fact Whishaw in 1815 was assuming editorial control of papers of Park, who died in 1806, to produce Journal of a Mission to the Interior of Africa (1815), bringing in James Rennell to amend the geographical content, and distancing Park from the African Association.

Whishaw wrote little else under his own name. He was said to have helped with the Thoughts on the Restriction of Payments in Specie (1803) of Peter King, 7th Baron King. He published an anonymous memoir of Smithson Tennant in 1815. The Pope of Holland House: Selections from the Correspondence of John Whishaw and His Friends 1813–1840 was published in 1906, edited by Lady Seymour.
