= Sir Francis Fletcher-Vane, 3rd Baronet =

British landowner and aristocrat (1797–1842)

Sir Francis Fletcher-Vane Bt
- Born: 29 March 1797; Hutton in the Forest, England
- Died: 15 February 1842 (aged 44); Frankfurt, Germany
- Education: Trinity College, Cambridge
- Relatives: Ancestor: Sir Henry Vane the Elder

Sir Francis Fletcher-Vane, 3rd Baronet (29 March 1797 – 15 February 1842), was a British landowner and aristocrat who served as High Sheriff of Cumberland in 1837. He was the third Baronet of Hutton.

== Life ==
Francis Fletcher-Vane was born on 29 March 1797, the son of Sir Frederick Fletcher-Vane, Bt, and Lady Hannah (née Bowerbank). He was educated at Trinity College, Cambridge and succeeded as the 3rd Baronet of Hutton in 1832 on the death of his father, Sir Frederick Fletcher-Vane. He was made High Sheriff of Cumberland in 1837.

There are extant letters at The National Archives indicating that Sir Francis suffered ill health all his life and he died at Frankfurt in Germany on 15 February 1842. His obituary in The Lancaster Gazette:

On the 15th ins., at Frankfort-sur Maine, Sir Francis Fletcher-Vane, Bart., of Armathwaite Hall, Cumberland. Sir Francis had been in a declining state of health for some time, and had gone to the continent for change of air. He was, we believe, left one son (a minor, who succeeds to the title) and two daughters [it was, in fact, two sons and a daughter].

Sir Francis's remains were re-interred at St James's Church, Hutton in the Forest, 'on their removal from Frankfort on the Maine'.

== Family ==
In 1823, he married Diana Olivia Beauclerk, daughter of Charles Beauclerk of St Leonard's Lodge, Sussex.

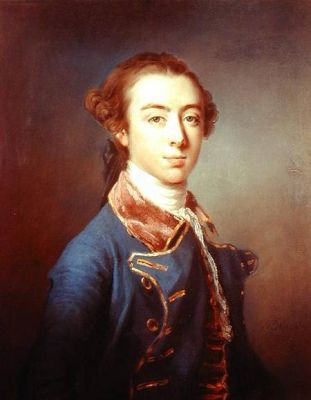
Topham Beauclerk, Grandfather of Lady Diana Vane

Charles Beauclerk was a direct descendant of Charles Beauclerk, 1st Duke of St Albans, an illegitimate child of Charles II and his mistress, the actress Nell Gwyn. Diana Beauclerk's father, Charles Beauclerk, was the son of Topham Beauclerk, the 18th century dandy, wit and great friend of Samuel Johnson, compiler of England's first dictionary. Charles's mother was Lady Diana Spencer, the daughter of the 3rd Duke of Marlborough and former wife of the 2nd Viscount Bolingbroke; the marriage to Bolingroke was annulled on the grounds of her 'criminal conversion' with Topham. On 29 March 1799, Charles Beauclerk married Emily Ogilvie, daughter of William Ogilvie and Lady Emilia Lennox with whom he had thirteen children. They lived at St Leonard's Lodge in Sussex where they were the neighbours of the poet Percy Bysshe Shelley. Mrs Charles Beauclerk often wintered in Pisa with leading members of English society:

Mrs Charles Beauclerk, daughter of the Duchess of Leinster, was a Regency brunette beauty known for her gallantries, and half sister of one of Mary [Shelley's] heroes, the dead Lord Edward Fitzgerald. [Thomas] Medwin, whose family and Shelley's were the Beauclerk's neighbours in Sussex, took Shelley to call on her, and despite Mary's notoriety Mrs Beauclerk was pleased to make her acquaintance. Her adolescent daughter Georgiana was especially taken with Mary.

One account of Charles Beauclerk describes him as 'a shy intellectual who lived quietly on his Horsham estate...saw to his sons' education, and while the daughters were dancing in Pisa with their mother, he had taken the boys to lectures in Geneva'.

By Lady Diana, Sir Francis Fletcher-Vane had three children: Gertrude, Henry and Frederick.

Sir Francis and Lady Diana's first child, Henry Ralph Fletcher-Vane, was born 13 January 1830 and succeeded to the baronetcy on the death of his father.

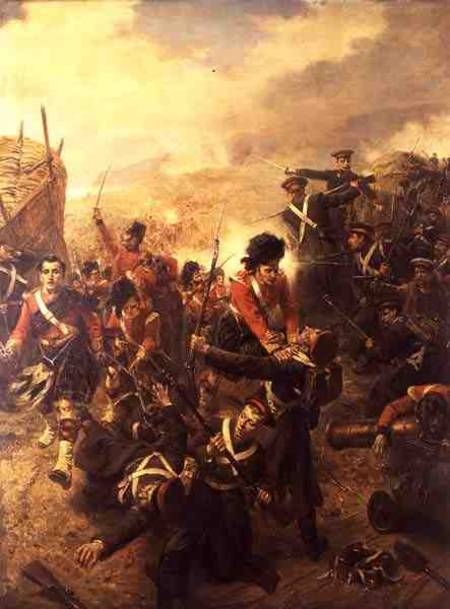
Battle of the Redan where Sir Francis's son suffered severe wounds

Gertrude Elizabeth Vane was born on 29 June 1831 at Hutton in the Forest. In 1857 she married Vincent Wing, a major in the 95th Regiment, at St George's, Hanover Square, London. Major Vincent Wing fought in the Crimean War, serving in the Eastern Campaign (1854–55). He was severely wounded at the Battle of the Alma when he was on the staff of Major-general Sir John Lysaght Pennefather and took part in the Siege of Sebastopol. By the time of the 1861 census for England he had retired from the army. It may be that Vincent Wing was introduced to Gertrude through the efforts of Gertrude's brother, Frederick Henry Vane, who had also fought in the Crimea as a major in the 23rd Foot, Royal Welsh Fusiliers.

Vincent Wing died on 30 September 1874; the London Gazette describes him as 'formerly of Belmore House, West Cowes, Isle of Wight in the county of Southampton but late of Burton Hall, Christchurch, in the county of Hampshire and of North Ormsby in the county of Lincoln'. His wife died 21 years later on 21 August 1895, leaving effects to her daughter, Evelyn Diana Wing, spinster. The Wings had a son, Frederick Drummond Vincent Wing, who was born in 1860 in Hampshire.

The third child, Frederick Fletcher-Vane, was born 12 December 1832 at Hutton in the Forest. He was educated at Eton College. After school Frederick enlisted as an ensign in the 23rd (Royal Welsh Fusiliers), Regiment of Foot. He was promoted lieutenant on 23 June 1854, captain on 23 March 1855 and brevet major on 4 June 1858. He suffered a slight wound at the Second Battle of Inkermann on 5 November 1854 and a severe wound at the final attack on the Redan, 8 September 1855. He died at 58 Ebury Street in Pimlico, London, leaving his estate to his brother, Henry Ralph Fletcher-Vane.

Baronetage of Great Britain
Preceded by Sir Frederick Fletcher-Vane	Baronet (Hutton in the County of Cumberland); 1832–1842	Succeeded by Sir Henry Fletcher-Vane
