= Sir Francis Fletcher-Vane, 5th Baronet =

British scouting pioneer (1861–1934)

Sir Francis Fletcher-Vane Bt
- Born: Francis Patrick Fletcher-Vane; 16 October 1861; Dublin, Ireland
- Died: 10 June 1934 (aged 72); London, England
- Military career
- Allegiance: United Kingdom
- Branch: British Army
- Service years: 1883–1904, 1914–1916
- Rank: Major
- Units: Worcestershire Militia; Scots Guards; Royal Engineers
- Commands: Captain in 26th Middlesex Cyclists
- Conflicts: Second Boer War; Easter Rising
- Other work: Writer, politician, scoutmaster

Sir Francis Patrick Fletcher-Vane, 5th Baronet FRGS (16 October 1861 – 10 June 1934) was an Irish-born British Army officer and baronet. Francis became the 5th Baronet of Hutton on the death in 1908 of his first cousin, Sir Henry Ralph Fletcher-Vane, 4th Baronet.

Fletcher-Vane was an early aide of Robert Baden-Powell and was the Scout Commissioner of London before Baden-Powell ousted him from his Baden-Powell Boy Scouts organisation. Fletcher-Vane later founded the Order of World Scouts, the earliest multinational scouting organisation, and is counted one of the founders of scouting in Italy.

As an army officer, he helped expose the murder of several innocent civilians by an officer under his command during the 1916 Easter Rising in Dublin.

== Early life ==
Vane was born at 10 Great George's Street, Dublin, in 1861. His parents were Lieutenant Frederick Henry Fletcher-Vane (1807–1894), of the 12th Lancers, son of Sir Frederick Fletcher-Vane, 2nd Baronet, and Rosalind, daughter of John Moore, of Prospect House, County Galway, Ireland.

Vane was raised in Sidmouth, Devon, England, and educated at Charterhouse School. Robert Baden-Powell also attended Charterhouse. In 1876, Vane enrolled at the Oxford Military College.

== Military career ==
After military college, Vane was assigned to the Worcestershire Militia, Scots Guards and the Submarine Mining section of the Royal Engineers over the period of 1883–1888. In 1886, he began residing at Toynbee Hall in East London. That year he started a 'Working Boys Cadet Corps'. He became a captain in the 26th Middlesex Rifle Volunteers in 1888. While serving in the Second Boer War (1899–1902), he was appointed a magistrate in 1902. He was removed from that position for supposedly being too "pro-Boer". He wrote "The War and One Year After" pamphlet in 1903, criticising the British method of war. With his follow-up pamphlet, Vane was "retired" from the military.

=== Ireland ===
At the start of World War I, Vane returned to the Army as a recruiting officer with the rank of Major and was sent to Ireland, attached to the Royal Munster Fusiliers.

During the Easter Rising, Vane distinguished himself for his courageous conduct in handling of abuses by an officer under his command, Captain John Bowen-Colthurst, who had ordered three unarmed civilians shot to death, and had himself killed an unarmed teenager. Vane had been directed to take command of the defence of Portobello Barracks, Dublin, then garrison for the largely Belfast-recruited Royal Irish Rifles and the Ulster Militia Battalion. On the third day of the rising, Vane had taken up an observation position in the tower of the Rathmines Town Hall. On returning to barracks, he learned that civilian hostages had been taken and later killed there by order of Captain Bowen-Colthurst. They included the well-known pacifist Francis Sheehy-Skeffington and two pro-Union journalists who were misidentified as Nationalists. Bowen-Colthurst had also led a raid against a house allegedly sympathetic to the insurgents, and during this raid he had summarily executed a youth, James Coade, in the street.

Vane ordered these incidents to be reported to the garrison high command and to the British high command. But his superiors covered up the crimes, and removed him from command. Thereupon Vane went directly to London and met with Secretary of War Lord Kitchener and with Maurice Bonham Carter, Principal Private Secretary to the Prime Minister, to expose the murders. As a result, Bowen-Colthurst was arrested a week after the rising, and was charged with murder at a court-martial held a month after the rising. The court-martial found Bowen-Colthurst guilty, but insane; he was sent to Broadmoor Hospital for the criminally insane.

Nevertheless, Vane's superior Sir John Maxwell filed an adverse report about Vane, resulting in Vane's dismissal from the army sometime prior to August 1916.

== Between periods of military service ==
Daily News, Manchester Guardian, Westminster and Truth employed Vane from 1902 to 1904 as a reporter for South Africa. He was the unsuccessful Liberal Party candidate for Burton in the 1906 United Kingdom general election. He became active in antiwar and suffragette campaigns from 1907 to 1912. He published two more items: Walks and Peoples in Tuscany (1908) and On Certain Fundamentals (1909).

== Scouting ==
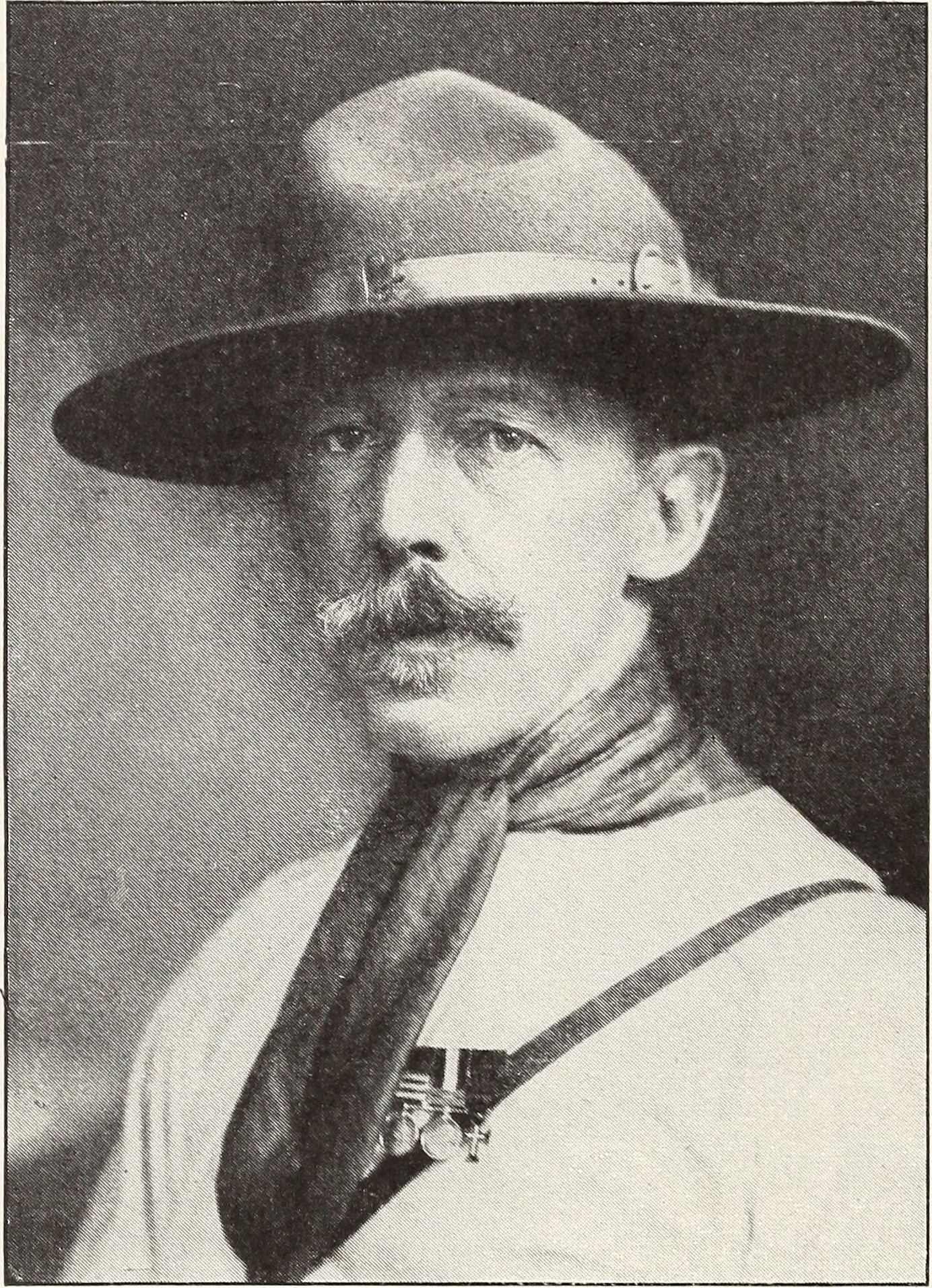

By 1909, Vane was the Boy Scouts' London Commissioner. He felt that Scouting should be nonmilitary and, through mediation, has reconciled the British Boy Scouts (BBS) with Baden-Powell's organisation (the BBS had formed as the Battersea Boy Scouts and had originally registered with Baden-Powell's organisation but left over perceived militarisation and the nondemocratic nature of the national headquarters). Vane pushed for the Boy Scouts to be more democratic, but his position was eliminated by Baden-Powell's headquarters staff. In a protest meeting, the London area Scoutmasters voted overwhelmingly in support of Sir Francis, however Baden-Powell did not reinstate him. Members of the National Service League, a pro-military group, were appointed to Baden-Powell's headquarters. On 3 December 1909, Vane accepted the presidency of the British Boy Scouts, taking several London-area Troops with him. The Quakers' Birmingham and Midland Troops also followed, as Vane was key in having Quaker meeting houses sponsor Scouting Troops.

Vane got the Boys' Life Brigade (BLB) to join the British Boy Scouts in a loose federation called The National Peace Scouts in February 1910. At the merger the BBS had 45,000 Scouts and BLB had 40,000 members. With Vane having an Italian summer home, he launched the Scouting Movement in Italy with the Ragazzi Esploratori Italiani in 1910. In 1911, Vane assisted Augustin Dufresne, a shipowner, to organise a French Scouting organisation.

With the spread of the alternative British Boy Scouts programme throughout the world, Vane informally aligned the various groups as the Legion of World Scouts, the first international organisation, in 1911, then more formally as the Order of World Scouts on 11 November 1911. Vane became the Grand Scout Master of the Order of World Scouts.

Vane put his wealth behind the organisations: providing a London headquarters and financed the organisation, even the manufacture of BBS uniforms. This overburdened his finances to the point of having to declare bankruptcy in 1912. Thus the British Boy Scouts lost their headquarters, source of equipment and uniforms and their leader. Vane continued his involvement with the remnant BBS, as he inspected the Troop of the London Commissioner Percy Herbert Pooley in 1915.

Vane returned to Italy after World War I to find that the Italian Boy Scouts he founded had been mainly absorbed by the National Scouts Corps (Corpo Nazionale Giovani Esploratori Italiani - CNGEI). Some joined in with the creation of the Catholic Association of Scouts (Associazione Scautistica Cattolica Italiana - ASCI) in 1916, later named AGESCI. He began working with the latter group. He tried to get Baden-Powell to accept the ASCI as a member of the World Organization of the Scout Movement. He also tried to get the BBS back together with the Boy Scouts Association. Both of these efforts were without success. In 1927, he left for the United Kingdom as the Fascists quashed the Italian Scouting Movement, in favour of the Opera Nazionale Balilla (ONB), an Italian Fascist youth organisation. Despite a private letter to Sir Francis Vane 24 April 1933, sympathising with Vane's worries, the Balilla was an organisation that was publicly highly praised by Baden-Powell, as the application of scouting as part of national education.

== Personal life ==
He succeeded his cousin Sir Henry Fletcher-Vane as baronet in 1908.

His first wife, Anna Oliphant da Costa Ricci, daughter of the Baron Anselmo da Costa Ricci of Portugal, whom he married in 1888, died in 1922. Vane became a Knight Commander of the Order of Christ (Portugal) in 1889. He married his second wife, Kathleen Crosbie in 1927. Sir Francis died in 1934 aged 72, after spending his last year of life in ill health at St Thomas' Hospital in Lambeth.

== Legacy ==
In 2016, Fletcher-Vane was commemorated on a postage stamp in Ireland to mark the centenary of the Easter Rising.

Baronetage of Great Britain
| Preceded by Sir Henry Fletcher-Vane | Baronet (Hutton in the County of Cumberland); 1908–1934 | Extinct |
Scouting
| Preceded by Colonel Frederick Charles Keyser | President, BBS; 1909–1913 | Vacant |
| New title | Grand Scoutmaster, OWS; 1911–1912 | Succeeded by Albert Jones Knighton |
