= Frederick Charles Keyser =

British military officer

- Military career
- Allegiance: United Kingdom
- Branch: British Army
- Rank: Colonel
- Commands: Royal Fusiliers
- Conflicts: Battle of Tell El Kebir

Colonel Frederick Charles Keyser CB (1841–1920) was a commanding officer in the Royal Fusiliers. Under Garnet Wolseley, 1st Viscount Wolseley, he was in command of the Signalling Party during the Egyptian Campaign of 1882. He was present at the Battle of Tell El Kebir, after which he was made a Companion of the Order of the Bath. His last appointment in the Army was Inspector-general of signalling, a position he held for five years. He married twice, his second wife being the daughter of Sir Benjamin Gordon KCB, who survived him.

Scouting
Preceded by New title	President, BBS; 1908	Succeeded by Sir Francis Fletcher-Vane
