= Armathwaite Hall =

Hotel in Bassenthwaite, Cumbria, England

Coordinates: 54°40′52″N 03°13′57″W

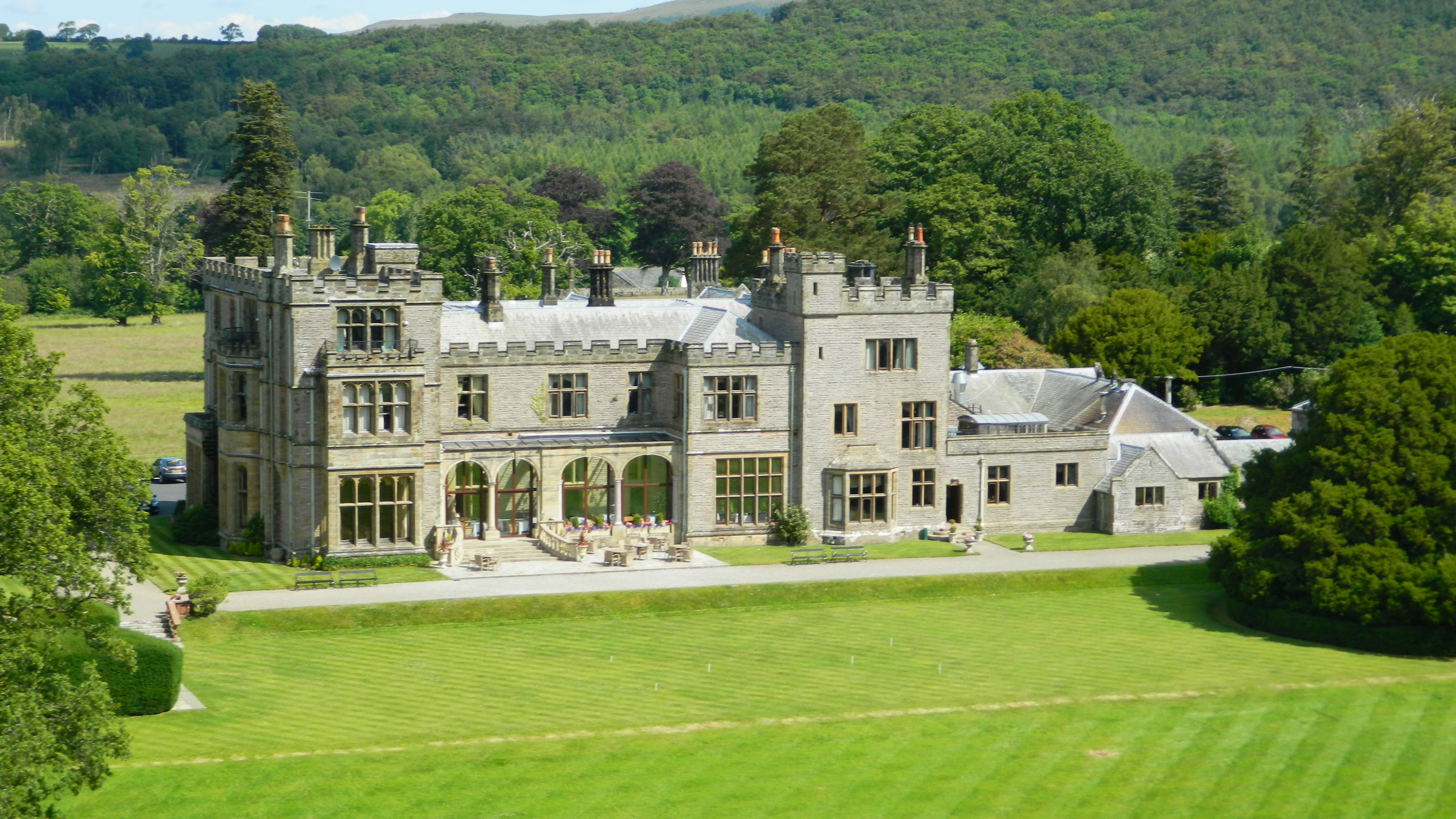
Armathwaite Hall

Armathwaite Hall is a luxury hotel and spa adjacent to Bassenthwaite Lake, in Cumbria.

== History ==
The present hall dates back to circa 1500; it was acquired by the Highmore family in 1540, by James Spedding (squire to Lord Egremont) in 1748 and then by Sir Frederick Fletcher-Vane (who had the courtyard and chapel added) in 1796. Ownership then passed to John Boustead (who owned coffee plantations in Ceylon and who had the hall extensively enlarged) in 1850. It then passed to Thomas Hartley (a local mine owner who had the hall extended to the designs of Charles John Ferguson) in 1880, to the Wivell family (owners of the Keswick Hotel) in 1926.

When under the control of the Wivell family, especially Joseph Banks Wivell's widow, Mary Johnson Wivell, it received attention and praise in Florence White's Where Shall We Eat or Put Up? In England, Wales, and Scotland (1936). "Armathwaite Hall is an old country mansion, carried on as a country house furnished with every comfort and luxury" for travellers.

It was acquired by the Graves family (the current owners) in 1976. It is now a hotel.

== See also ==
- Hugh Boustead
