= John Bowstead (cricketer) =

English cricketer

John Bowstead (14 May 1872 – 7 January 1939) was an English first-class cricketer active from 1909 who played for Middlesex. He was born in Penrith, Cumberland and died in Ealing.
