= Neil Boustead =

English cricketer (born 1953)

Personal information
- Full name: William Neil Boustead
- Born: 13 August 1953 (age 73); Carlisle, Cumberland, England
- Batting: Left-handed
- Role: Wicket-keeper

Domestic team information
- Years: Team
- 1980–1988: Cumberland

Career statistics
Competition	List A
Matches	3
Runs scored	22
Batting average	–
100s/50s	0/0
Top score	17*
Balls bowled	–
Wickets	–
Bowling average	–
5 wickets in innings	–
10 wickets in match	–
Best bowling	–
Catches/stumpings	2/–
- Source: Cricinfo, 30 March 2011

William Neil Boustead (born 13 August 1953) is a former English cricketer. Boustead was a left-handed batsman who fielded as a wicket-keeper. He was born in Carlisle, Cumberland.

Boustead made his debut for Cumberland in the 1980 Minor Counties Championship against the Lancashire Second XI. Boustead played Minor counties cricket for Cumberland from 1980 to 1988, including 45 Minor Counties Championship matches and 4 MCCA Knockout Trophy matches. In 1984, he made his List A debut against Derbyshire in the NatWest Trophy. He played two further List A matches for Cumberland, against Middlesex in 1985 and Lancashire in 1986. In his three List A matches, he scored 22 runs, with a high score of 17*. His two batting innings ended unbeaten, leaving him without a batting average. Behind the stumps he took 2 catches.

Boustead runs his own confectionery business in Penrith, Cumbria.
