= Fletcher-Vane baronets =

Title in the Baronetage of Great Britain

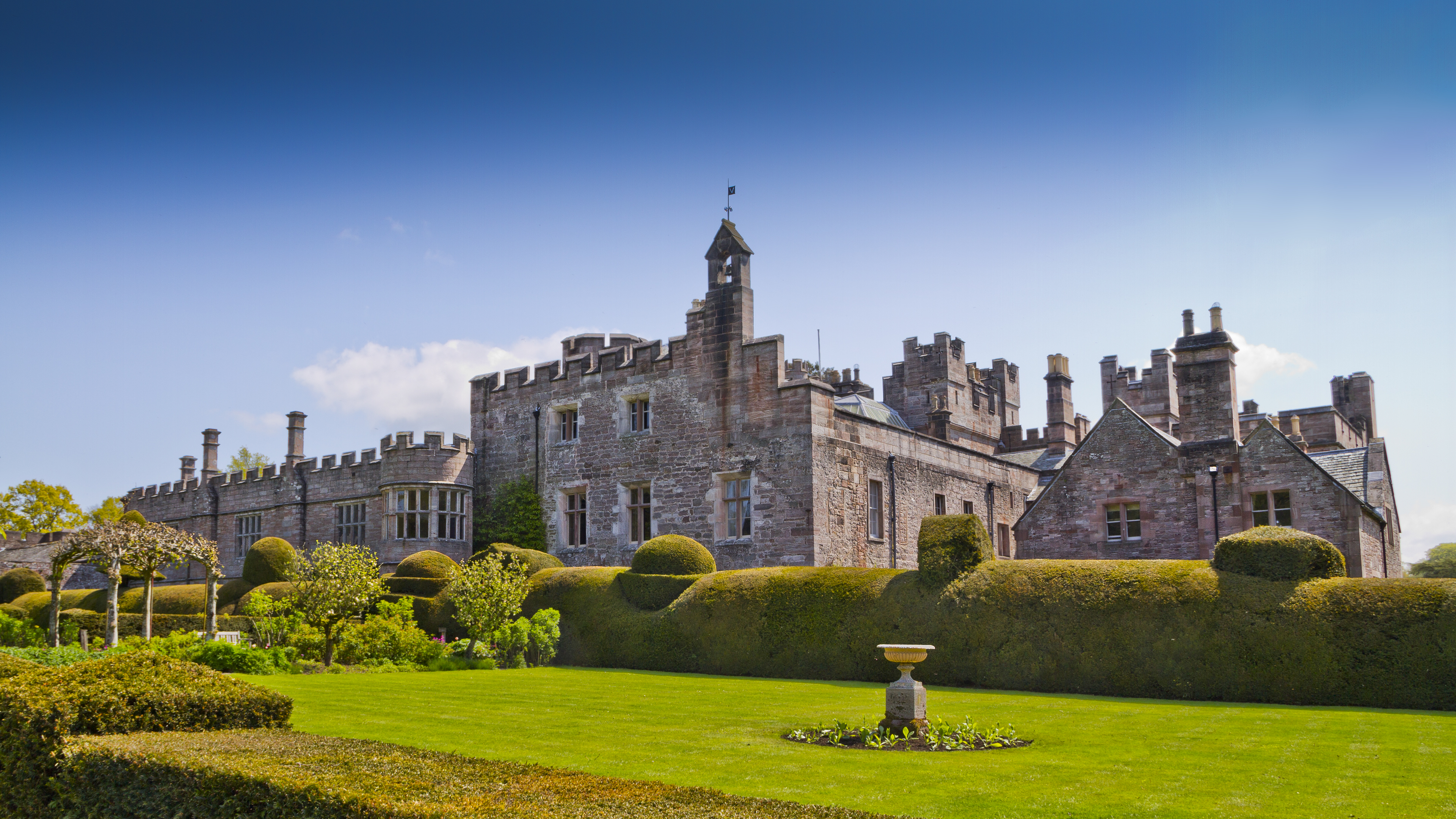
Hutton in the Forest, the seat of the Fletcher-Vane baronets

The Fletcher-Vane (previously Vane-Fletcher) baronetcy, of Hutton in the Forest in the County of Cumberland, was a title in the Baronetage of Great Britain. It was created on 27 June 1786 at the end of his life for the landowner Lionel Vane-Fletcher.

His son, the 2nd Baronet, was a Member of Parliament for Winchelsea and Carlisle. He assumed the surname of Fletcher-Vane in lieu of Vane-Fletcher.

The 5th Baronet was involved in the Scouting movement. The title became extinct on his death in 1934.

== Fletcher-Vane (previously Vane-Fletcher) baronets, of Hutton ==
- Sir Lionel Wright Vane-Fletcher, 1st Baronet (1723–1786)
- Sir Frederick Fletcher-Vane, 2nd Baronet (1760–1832)
- Sir Francis Fletcher-Vane, 3rd Baronet (1797–1842)
- Sir Henry Ralph Fletcher-Vane, 4th Baronet (1830–1908)
- Sir Francis Patrick Fletcher Vane, 5th Baronet (1861–1934), founder of the Boy Scouts movement in Italy, and also of the Order of World Scouts. He left no heir.

== Extended family ==
The family estates at Hutton in the Forest passed to William Vane, a distant kinsman of the Fletcher-Vane baronets, who took the surname Fletcher-Vane in 1931 and was created Baron Inglewood in 1964. The surname reflects descent from the Fletcher baronets of Hutton, but Inglewood was not a descendant of the Fletcher family, unlike the Fletcher-Vane baronets who were direct descendants.

== Coat of arms ==
Coat of arms of Fletcher-Vane baronets
Crest 1st, A dexter arm embowed holding a sword all ppr. point to the sinister. 2nd, A dexter hand holding a sword point to the dexter all ppr. Escutcheon Quarterly, 1st & 4th, Or three sinister gauntlets azure and a canton gules (Vane, of Cumberland). 2nd & 3rd, Azure three sinister gauntlets or (Vane, of Kent)

Baronetage of Great Britain
Preceded by Corbet baronets	Vane-Fletcher baronets of Hutton; 27 June 1786	Succeeded by Hoare baronets
