= Bill Boustead =

Australian Art Conservator (1912–1999)

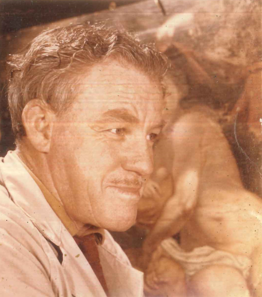
- Bill Boustead Art Conservator
- Born: William Morris Boustead; 3 January 1912; Gloucester, NSW, Australia
- Died: 15 October 1999 (aged 87); Sydney, NSW, Australia

William Morris Boustead (3 January 1912 – 15 October 1999) was an Australian Art conservator. He was conservator at the Art Gallery of New South Wales from 1954 until 1977.

== Biography ==
Boustead was born in Gloucester, New South Wales and educated at Fort Street High School. His first job after leaving school was working in a metallurgical and chemical laboratory while studying at technical college.

After spending most of the 1930s in the Pacific he served with the Royal Australian Engineers during World War II. Following his discharge in 1945 Boustead began studying at the National Art School in Sydney. In 1946 he was appointed to the conservation workshop of the Art Gallery of New South Wales then appointed as gallery conservator in 1954.

Boustead's achievements during his time as conservator at the AGNSW included:

- Building the first vacuum hot table in Australia
- Setting up the first program in Australia to train conservators
- Regarded as the Grandfather of the Conservation Profession in Australia
- Leading the Australian team as part of the International response to the flooding of Florence in 1966
- Pioneering processes to conserve art works from tropical regions especially Bark Paintings
- Performed the initial conservation assessment of Jackson Pollock's Blue Poles in 1974 following its purchase by the Whitlam Government

== Oral History ==
Boustead was interviewed in 1975 by Hazel de Berg, which can be found at the National Library of Australia.
