= Hugh Boustead =

British military officer, modern pentathlete, and diplomat

Colonel Sir John Boustead KBE, CMG, DSO, MC & Bar
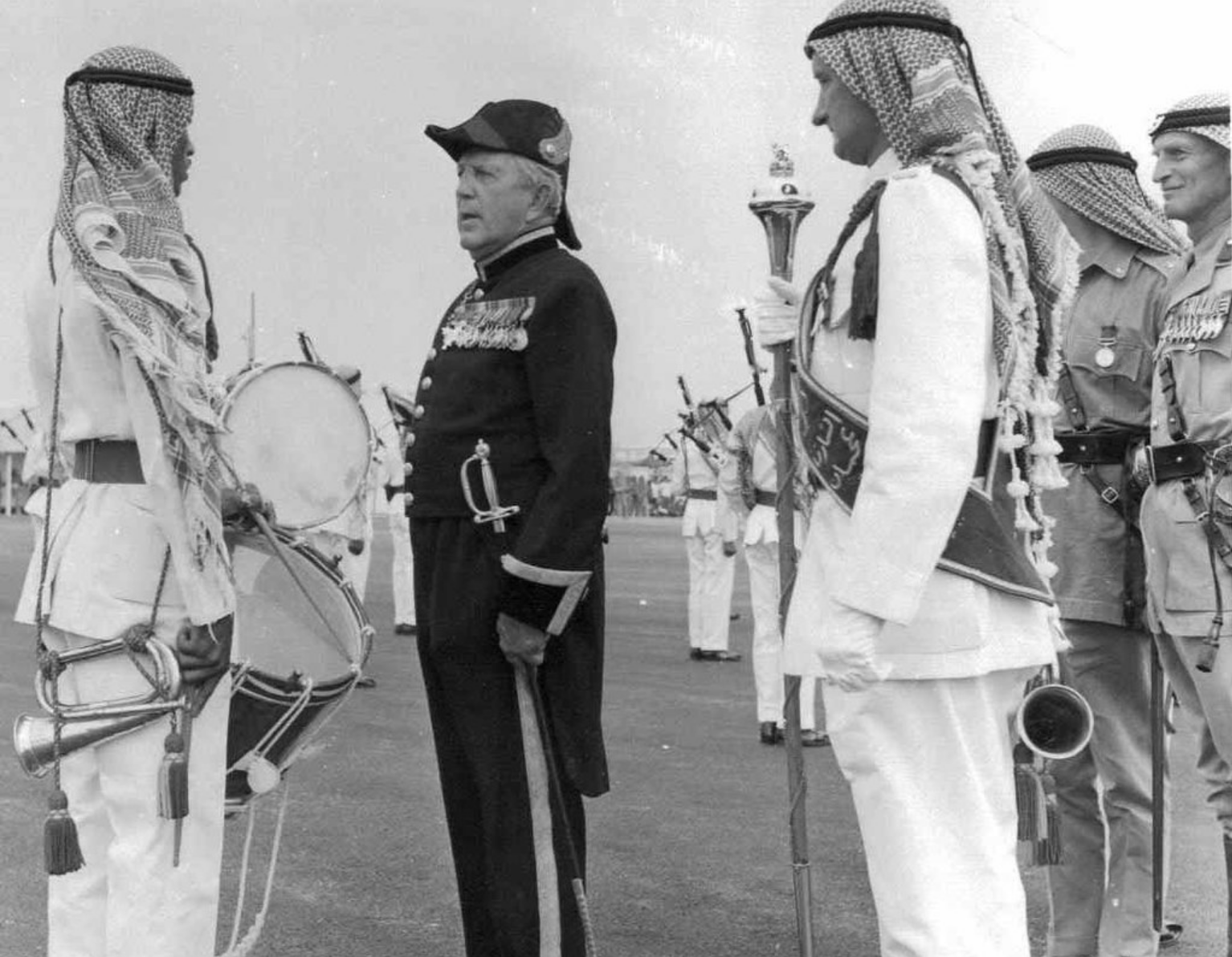

Personal details
- Born: 14 April 1895 Nuwara Eliya, Sri Lanka
- Died: 3 April 1980 (aged 84) Dubai, United Arab Emirates
- Occupation: British military officer, modern pentathlete, diplomat
- Awards: Knight Commander of the Order of the British Empire, Companion of the Order of St Michael and St George, Distinguished Service Order, Military Cross & Medal bar

Military service
- Allegiance: United Kingdom
- Branch/service: Royal Navy; (United Kingdom) Royal Navy (1913–1917); British Army British Indian Army; (United Kingdom) Transvaal Scottish Regiment (1917–1919)
- Years of service: 1913–1965
- Rank: Colonel; Sub Lieutenant

Colonel Sir John Edmond Hugh Boustead KBE CMG DSO MC & Bar (14 April 1895 – 3 April 1980) was a British military officer, modern pentathlete, and diplomat who served in numerous posts across several Middle Eastern countries, including ambassador to Abu Dhabi from 1961 to 1965. The son of a tea planter from Sri Lanka, Boustead began his career with the Royal Navy, but soon joined the British Army to fight in the trenches during World War I, where he earned his first of two Military Crosses. Following an appearance at the 1920 Summer Olympics, Boustead spent several years as a mountaineer and explorer prior to being appointed commander of the Sudan Camel Corps, with whom he served through World War II. He then embarked on a diplomatic career until his 1965 retirement and published an autobiography, The Wind of Morning, in 1971, nine years prior to his death in Dubai.

== Early life ==
Boustead was born on 14 April 1895 in Nuwara Eliya, Sri Lanka, the son of a local tea planter who later became a director of The Imperial Ethiopian Rubber Company. He was educated at the Cheam School and attended Britannia Royal Naval College (then Royal Naval College, Dartmouth) prior to the onset of World War I, where he began the conflict as a midshipman in the Royal Navy, having attained that rank on 15 January 1913. On 15 May 1915 he was promoted to acting Sub-Lieutenant, but deserted this post one month later while on leave in Simon's Town to engage in trench warfare as a member of the Transvaal Scottish Regiment from South Africa. He earned a Military Cross at the Battle of Arras, which was gazetted on 26 July 1917 with the citation:

SOUTH AFRICAN FORCE.

2nd Lt. Hugh Boustead, Infy.

For conspicuous gallantry and devotion to duty. As intelligence and sniping officer he showed great skill and initiative in posting

the snipers. His fine leadership and good disposition largely contributed to the success of the operation.

Boustead received the honour from George V of the United Kingdom on 15 August 1917 and transferred to the British Indian Army ten days later. He was posted to the 2nd battalion 4th Gurkha Rifles. He was promoted to lieutenant on 6 August 1918. He returned to the South African Army on 30 September 1918. A Bar to the MC followed, for actions on 25 August 1919 at Kardel, fighting alongside the Cossacks against the Bolshevik Red Armyat Tsaritsyn. The citation was gazetted on 23 April 1920 and read:

SOUTH AFRICAN FORCE.

2nd Lt. (A./Capt.) Hugh Boustead, M.C. S. Afr. Infy.

For conspicuous gallantry at Kardel, on the 25th August, 1919, when by the skilful manner in which he personally handed Lewis guns he assisted in beating off several hostile cavalry attacks, and by his example greatly inspired the Lewis-gun sections of the Russian regiment to which he was attached.

(M.C. gazetted 26th July, 1917.)

At this time he was officially an "Instr[uctor], Physical Training" with the infantry. His gallantry eventually led to the pardoning of his earlier desertion.

== Career ==
A boxing champion in the lightweight division during his service with the British army, Boustead was recruited to captain the British team in the modern pentathlon at the 1920 Summer Olympics. He finished joint 14th in a field of 23 competitors in his only Olympic appearance. He then continued his military career and, after transferring to the Gordon Highlanders, he was seconded from them to serve in Sudan beginning 19 November 1924. A seasoned explorer, he participated in both the 1926 British expedition to Kangchenjunga and the 1933 expedition to Mount Everest, organized his own mountaineering expedition in Sikkim, explored the Libyan desert with Ralph Alger Bagnold in 1932, and traversed the wastes of Greenland.

Boustead was promoted to the rank of captain on 1 March 1927 and served as a General Staff Officer, Third Grade from 22 July 1929 to 26 November 1930. He was promoted to local major on 3 February 1931, a secondment that culminated in his appointment as commander of the Sudan Camel Corps later that year. He was then promoted to local lieutenant colonel on 17 October 1931 and awarded a brevet majority on 1 January 1933. He was appointed Officer of the Order of the British Empire in the 1934 King's Birthday Honours. His secondment ended on 19 November 1934 and he returned to regimental duty with the Gordons in his substantive rank of captain. He retired in April 1935 to begin a career with the Sudan Political Service and spent five years as District Commissioner in Darfur.

Boustead rejoined the military following the onset of World War II to raise, train, and command the Sudanese Frontier Force. As a local Lieutenant-Colonel and commander of its Camel Corps he led some of the units that helped restore Emperor Haile Selassie I to the throne of Ethiopia in 1941. For his actions in this conflict, he was recommended for the Distinguished Service Order by Orde Wingate on 15 August 1941, which he received on 30 December 1941, being Mentioned in Despatches on the same date. His World War II service officially ended on 7 December 1946 and the honorary rank of Colonel was bestowned upon him.

After the conflict Boustead served as a diplomat in several Middle Eastern countries including Sudan, Yemen, and Oman, prior to spending nine years (1949–1958) as a Resident Adviser in the Aden Protectorate. His next post was the then-Sultanate of Muscat and Oman, where he held the position of Development Secretary. He was appointed political agent (then equivalent to ambassador) of Abu Dhabi in 1961, a post that he held until 1965. He was promoted Knight Commander of the Order of the British Empire in the New Year Honours that year, and presented with the Lawrence of Arabia Memorial Medal of the Royal Society for Asian Affairs.

== Later life ==
Following his 1965 retirement Boustead went on a lecture tour in the United States, and eventually settled down in Mezyad in the U.A.E., where he was asked by Sheikh Zayed bin Sultan Al Nahyan to oversee his stable of horses in Al Ain. In 1971 he published his autobiography, The Wind of Morning, which was well received. In addition to his knighthood, DSO, and receiving the Military Cross and Bar, he was appointed Companion of the Order of St Michael and St George in the 1954 Queen's Birthday Honours and awarded the St George's Military Medal with 1 Palm by Haile Selassie. He died on 3 April 1980 in Dubai at the age of 84, having never married. At Boustead's death, British MP Richard Luce claimed that no one had a greater impact in "cement[ing] relations between the British and the Arabs" as Boustead.

== See also ==
- Armathwaite Hall
