= Hutton in the Forest =

Country house in Cumbria, UK

Coordinates: 54.7140°N 2.8390°W

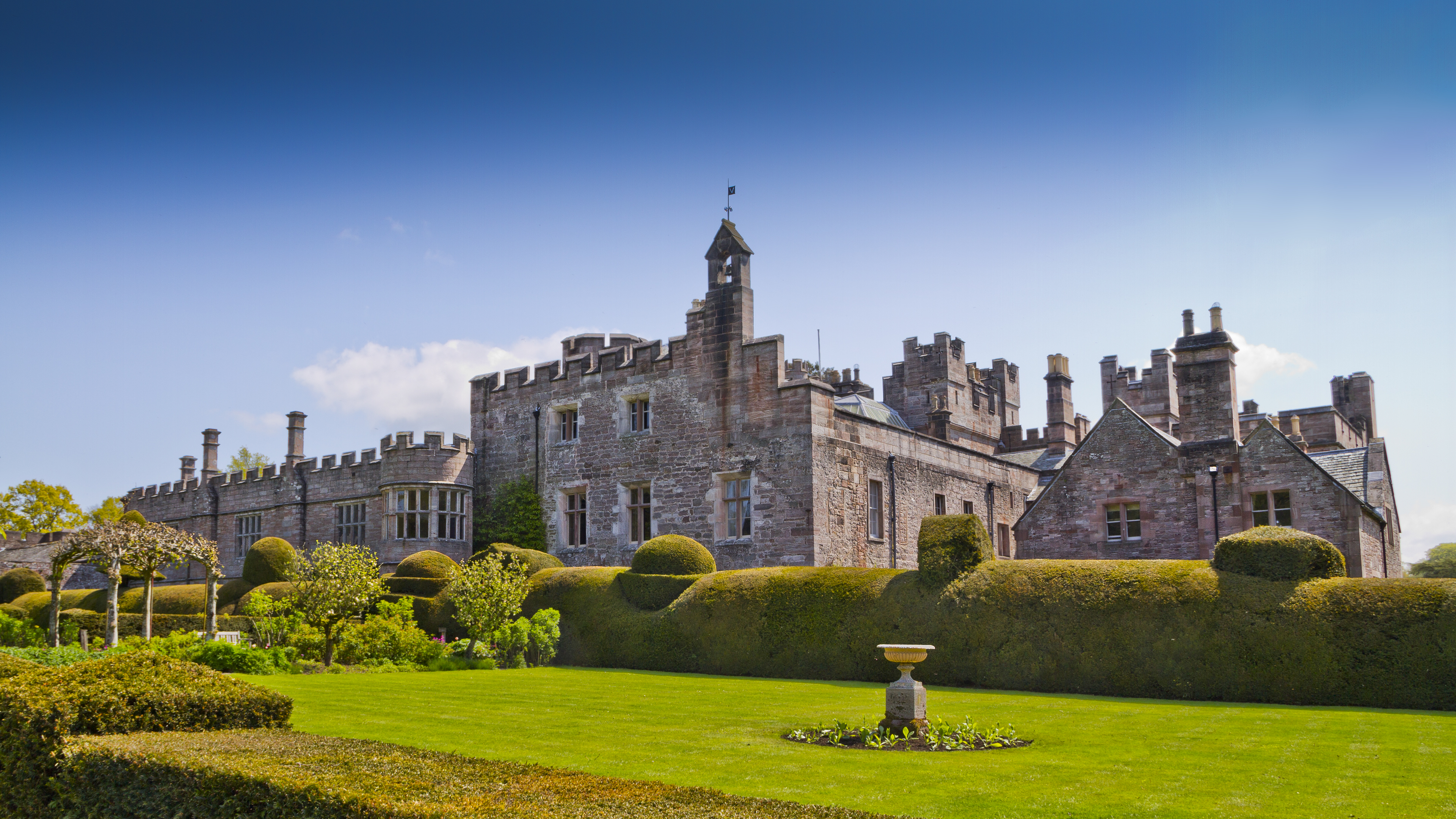
- Interactive map of the Hutton in the Forest area

General information
- Location: Cumbria, England

Website
- www.hutton-in-the-forest.co.uk

Hutton in the Forest is a Grade I listed country house near the village of Skelton in the historic county of Cumberland, which now forms part of the modern county of Cumbria, England. It belonged to the Fletcher-Vane family from 1605 until 1931, when it became the property of the Barons Inglewood who were distant relatives of the Fletcher-Vane family.

Hutton-in-the-Forest was originally a medieval stronghold, and the pele tower survives. Succeeding generations have altered and added to the house, and both the outside and inside show a wide range of decorative styles from the 17th century to the present day. The gallery, a rare feature in the North of England, dates from the 1630s and contains early furniture and portraits. The hall, built in 1680, is dominated by the Cupid Staircase, which leads to a suite of mid-18th century rooms, including the Cupid Room. The drawing room dates from about 1830, the library from 1870, and Lady Darlington's Room is decorated in the Arts and Crafts style.

The Walled Garden, built in the 1730s, houses a large collection of herbaceous plants. The terraces were originally laid out in the 17th century. The woodland walk contains a 17th-century dovecote which unusually still contains the potence, an internal rotatable ladder. The 1st Lord Inglewood added a number of new tree species to the grounds, and the tree trail guide now lists seventy within the arboretum.

In a nearby field is the small church of St James, recorded as far back as 1291 as the Church in the Green Field. In Victorian times, the architect Anthony Salvin carried out extensive renovations. A fragment of a Norman Cross is preserved within the church, and many memorials are reminders of the influence of the Fletchers and Vanes over the centuries.

== See also ==
- Grade I listed buildings in Cumbria
- Listed buildings in Skelton, Cumbria
