= John de Lilburne =

14th Century English knight

The Lilburn coat of arms: a cendree (or sable) field, with three bougets argent. The blason varies for the Lilburns of Thickley Punchardon in which the colours are inverted: argent, three bougets sable, a crescent gules.

Sir John de Lilburne of West Lilburn (1279–1355) was a knight who held numerous political and military offices during the first half of the 14th Century. A member of the Lilburn family of Northumberland, Sir John took part in Sir Gilbert de Middleton's rebellion against King Edward II of England, acting on behalf of the monarch's cousin, the 2nd Earl of Lancaster.

== Parentage ==
Lilburne was son of Idonea de Vieuxpont (or Vipont) (1255–1333), daughter of Robert de Vieuxpont, II Baron of Westmoreland; Idonea owned Pendragon Castle and founded St Mary's Outhgill in Mallerstang, Cumbria. The identity of his father is uncertain: evidence in a pedigree following visitations in 1575, 1615 and 1666 indicates him to have been William de Lilburne, member of the Lilburn family who held manors throughout Northumberland; other genealogical documentation from Northumberland, studying the family from the Vieuxpont side, shows that Sir John de Lilburne could be the son of a Roger (or Robert) de Leybourne, however the usage of the name Lilburne throughout contemporary sources referring to Sir John's exploits and offices would suggest the former.

== Knighthood and rebellion against Edward II ==
Lilburne is listed in King Edward II's Wardrobe accounts as one of 42 household knights in attendance upon the King in court on Christmas Day 1315, the same day in which he received his knighthood bearing the Lilburn coat of arms (sable, three water bougets argent), and is recorded to have held the manor of West Lilburn in 1317.

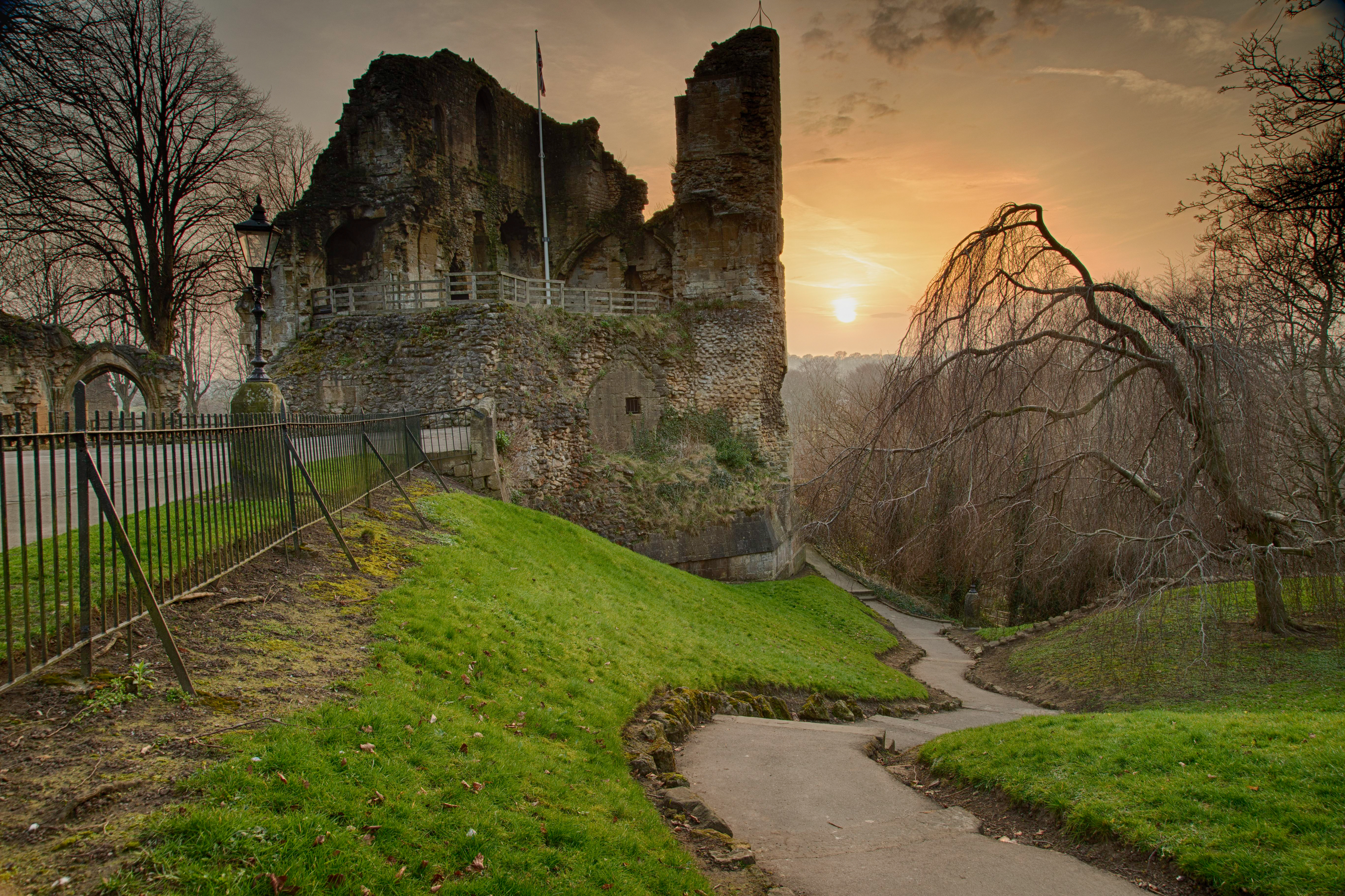
Ruins of Knaresborough Castle, Northumberland.

In 1315, Sir John became Constable of Mitford Castle, having been seized from the Valence family by fellow household knight of the King's Court Gilbert de Middleton, and joined Sir Gilbert's adherents in open rebellion against Edward II, seizing Knaresborough Castle in 1317 (held by Sir John from 5 October 1317 to 29 January 1318) on behalf of the King's cousin, Thomas, the Earl of Lancaster.

During these events, on 1 September 1317, the rebel knights assaulted and "despoiled" the controversial Bishop Elect Lewis de Beaumont, his brother and Constable of the palatinate castle of Norham-upon-Tweed Henry de Beaumont, and two cardinals, Gaucelin de Jean and Luca Fieschi, as they approached Rushyford, between Woodham and Ferryhill. The two cardinals were travelling from London to Scotland in order to arbitrate a truce with Robert the Bruce while the Beaumont brothers were headed to Durham, accompanying the cardinals on their way North so that Lewis could be enthroned as bishop in their presence. After despoiling the travellers, Sir Gilbert and Sir John imprisoned the Beaumonts at Mitford Castle, "delivering two horses to the cardinals to go freely to Durham" and later freeing Lewis de Beaumont on 17 October. Sir John de Lilburne was listed among those who attacked the party of travellers but was pardoned for his involvement with Sir Gilbert (with the exception of the robbery committed upon the cardinals) on 19 March 1318 in accordance with the terms granted upon surrendering Knaresborough Castle and again on 12 November, forfeiting a portion of his lands for adhering to the Earl of Lancaster's rebellion, some of which were later restored to the family after Sir John's death. In fact, despite his transgressions, Sir John was deemed to have borne "himself well towards the late king and the king and died in the fealty of the latter without any suspicion of evil against him" albeit an "adherent of the Scots with Gilbert de Middleton, traitor to the late king".

The knights' role in the rebellion ended in the same year after the execution of Sir Gilbert de Middleton (due to his station and that of the cardinals, assaulted while on a diplomatic mission, he was hanged, drawn and quartered on 26 January) and the stipulation of the Treaty of Leake on 9 August between Edward II and the Earl of Lancaster. The Treaty, however, did not last: Lancaster headed another rebellion in 1321 and was eventually defeated in the Battle of Boroughbridge, convicted of treason, and beheaded near Pontefract Castle, all in the following year.

== Dunstanburgh Castle ==
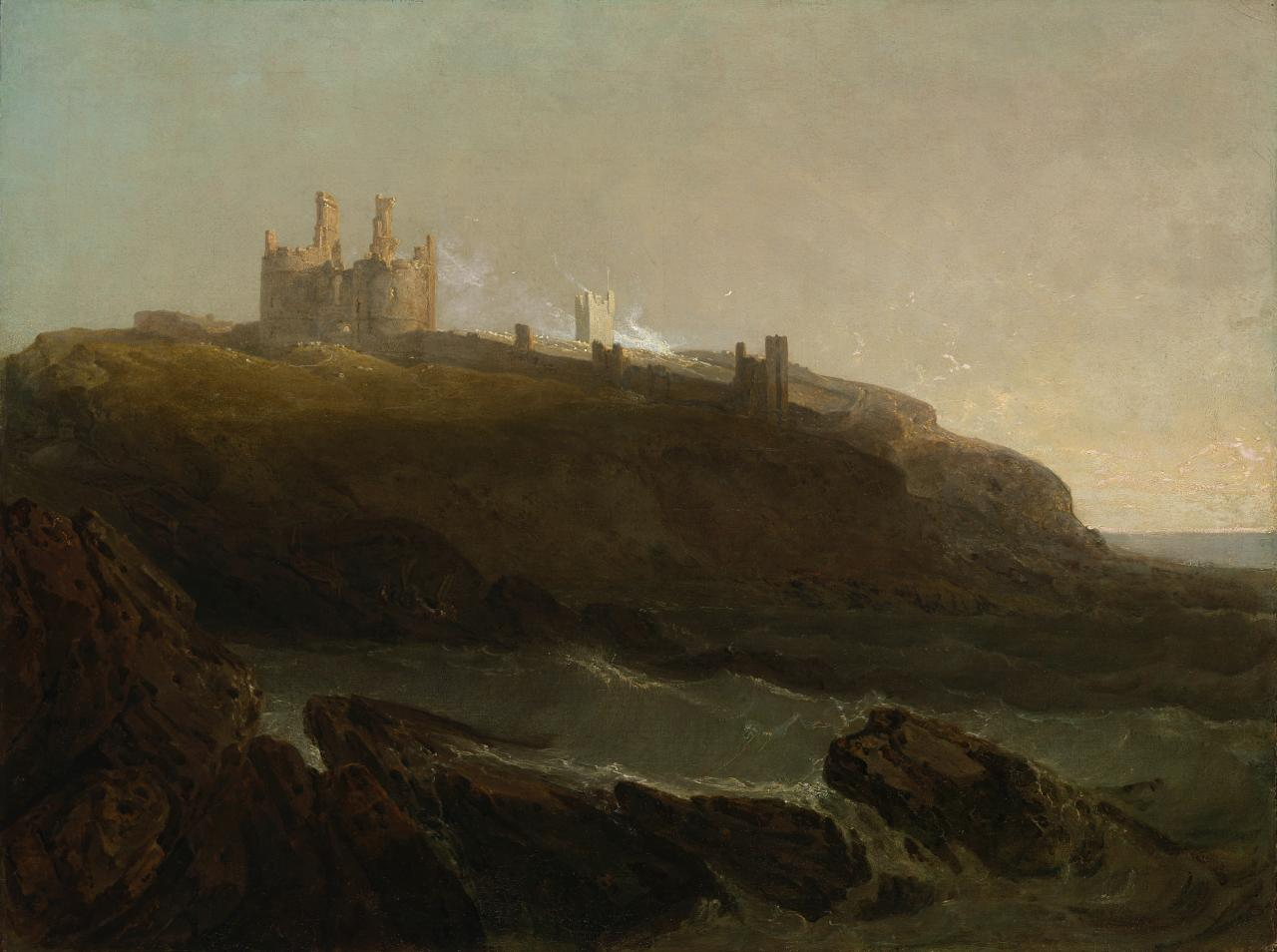
A depiction of Dunstanburgh Castle at sunrise by J. M. W. Turner, entitled Dunstanburgh Castle, north-east coast of Northumberland, sunrise after a squally night (Oil on canvas, 1798)

After acquiring lands in Beanley in 1320 (for which he is recorded doing homage to his overlord, Henry II Baron Percy of Northumberland, in 1324), in 1322, Sir John de Lilburne was appointed Constable of Dunstanburgh Castle, built by the same Thomas Earl of Lancaster for whom the knight had seized Knaresborough Castle six years prior.

The castle had only just been completed in 1322 when the Earl of Lancaster had been sentenced to death and executed by the King. In the same year, Lilburne was involved in the furnishing of 68 hobilars from the castle garrison for the king's invasion of Scotland. Furthermore, shortly after his arrival, on 26 September, despite having only just been appointed to a newly constructed castle, Sir John was firmly rebuked by the King, alongside Roger de Horslee, Ralph de Neville and Henry de Percy (Constables of Bamburgh Castle, Warkworth Castle and Alnwick Castle respectively), for their negligence in defending the realm against invasions from Scotland.

The Castle's highest point, the Lilburn Tower, was built either by Sir John de Lilburne, due to its name, or by the Earl of Lancaster in his honour, probably placed in the most visible and provocative position to be seen from the Earl's cousin Edward II's castle at Bamburgh, 9 miles away.

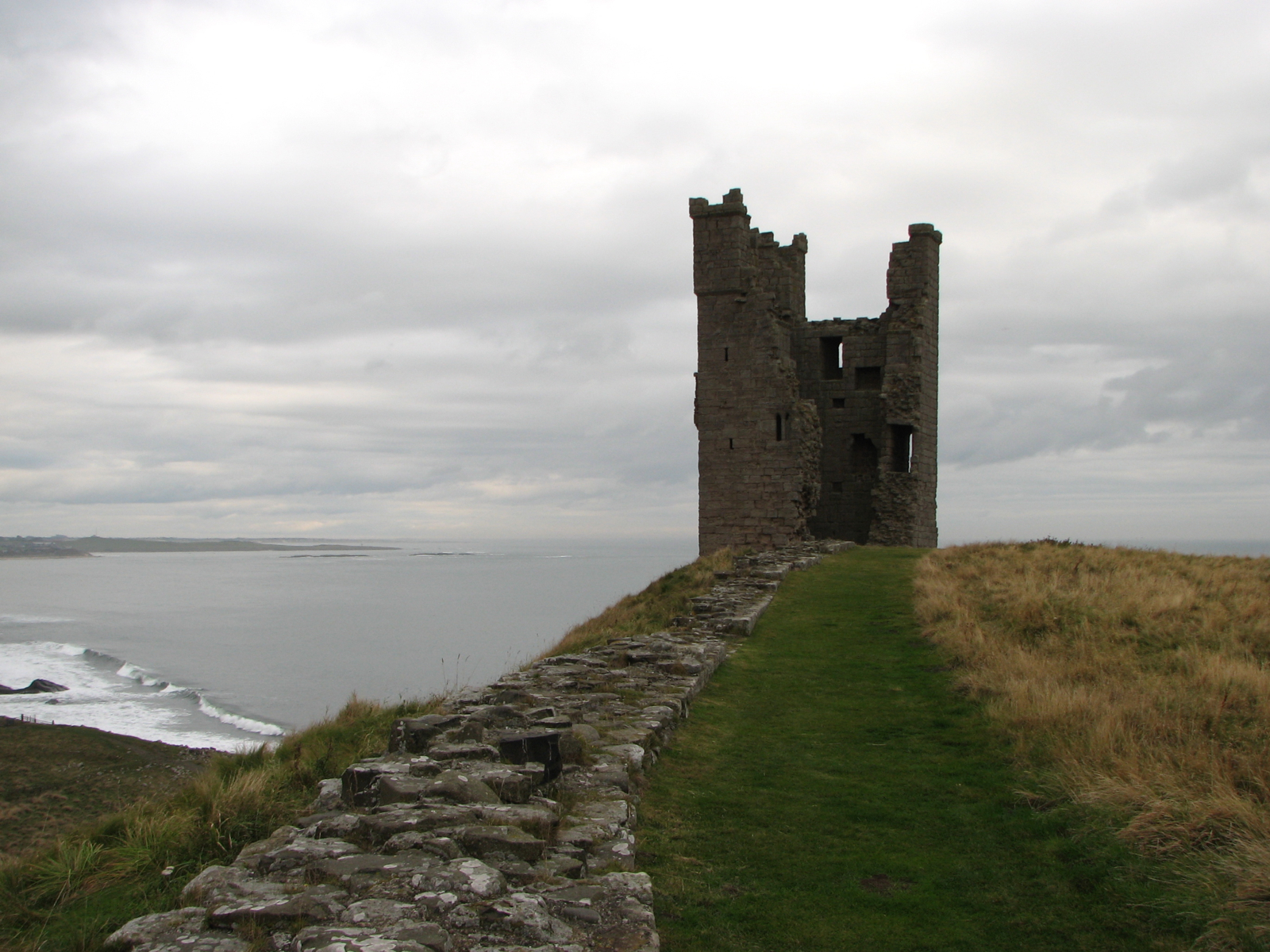
Lilburn Tower overlooking the coastline.

The garrison stationed at Dunstanburgh Castle took part in the Battle of Old Byland in North Yorkshire in 1322, and was later bolstered with 130 more men, including hobelars, providing an essential addition to the border defences against the Scots.

Sir John was also recorded as Constable at Dunstanburgh in 1326, after the castle had been handed back to Thomas' brother, Henry of Lancaster, when he was commissioned as Supervisor of the Northern Ports to send all eligible ships from the North to Orewell, in Suffolk, in defence of the kingdom against Edward II's Queen, Isabella of France, as she moved to invade England.

== Later offices and death ==
Sir John de Lilburne of West Lilburne was also Commissioner of Array in Northumberland in 1325, a member of parliament for Northumberland as of February 1327 and Sheriff of Northumberland from 1327 to 1328 and again in 1330. Sir John de Lilburne of West Lilburne continued to fight the Scots under Edward III and died in 1355.
