= Sutherland baronets =

Baronetcy in the Baronetage of the United Kingdom

The Sutherland Baronetcy, of Dunstanburgh Castle in Embleton in the County of Northumberland, is a title in the Baronetage of the United Kingdom. It was created on 16 June 1921 for the businessman Arthur Sutherland. He was Chairman of the Sutherland Steamship Co Ltd and of the Newcastle Commercial Exchange, Lord Mayor of Newcastle upon Tyne in 1919 and President of the Chamber of Shipping of the United Kingdom. The third Baronet did not use his title.

== Sutherland baronets, of Dunstanburgh Castle (1921) ==
- Sir Arthur Munro Sutherland, 1st Baronet (1867–1953)
- Sir (Benjamin) Ivan Sutherland, 2nd Baronet (1901–1980)
- (Sir) John Brewer Sutherland, 3rd Baronet (1931–2024)
- Sir Peter William Sutherland, 4th Baronet (born 1963)

The heir apparent is the present holder's son, Tom Peter Sutherland (born 1999)
