= Lilburn family =

Lilburn
- The Lilburn coat of arms: a cendree (or sable) field, with three bougets argent.
- Country: Kingdom of England, United Kingdom
- Origin: Lilburn, Northumberland
- Motto: Vis Viri Fragilis

The Lilburns are a family originating in Northumberland, United Kingdom, and were members of the country's lesser gentry throughout the Late Middle Ages up until the 17th century. The family name Lilburn (variations include Lilburne, Lilleburne and Lilburne) derives from the original home and holdings of the family in and around West Lilburn, Northumberland, forfeited to the Lilburns from the barony of Wark by Robert de Ros in 1297 after revolting to the Scots, and the and nearby river, Lill burn (or Lilburn Burn).

== Coat of arms ==
The heraldic blason for the Lilburn coat of arms is: cendree (or sable), three bougets argent. The Lilburn arms appeared "cut in stone" on the chapel of Belford and, albeit no longer visible, were recorded by Richard Gough during his tours across Britain to also include an annulet or crescent.

A variation is that of the Lilburns of Thickley Punchardon in which the colours appear inverted, as recorded during a Visitation of Northumberland in 1666 for John Lilburne of Thickley Punchardon: argent, three bougets sable, a crescent gules.

The motto recorded for the Lilburn family is: "Vis Viri Fragilis" ("Weak is the strength of man").

== Family history ==
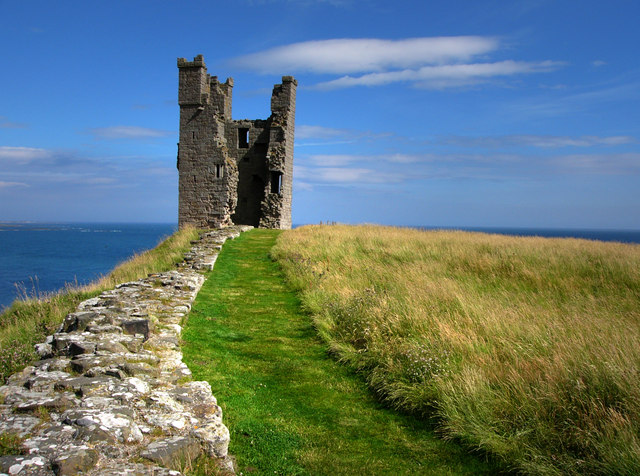
Lilburn Tower of Dunstanburgh Castle, seen from the edge of the outer bailey.

The Lilburn family can be traced back to Lilburn, Northumberland. The family name can be found carved into ancient gravestones in the vicinity of West Lilburn Tower, Lilburn, and Lindisfarne (Holy Island), near the medieval priory. In a 14th-century church's graveyard, near West Lilburn Tower, a number of tombs allegedly belong to the Knights Templar, among which some bear the Lilburn name.

Over the course of the 13th, 14th and 15th Centuries, the Lilburns are recorded to have owned moieties and knight's fees of numerous manors including those of Belford, Easington, Wooler, Beanly, Shawdon, Glanton and West Lilburn. They are also recorded to have held significant military and political offices, including as knights, constables, commissioners of array, sheriffs and members of parliament well into the 17th Century, primary examples of whom were Sir William Lilburne in the 13th Century and the two Sir John Lilburnes in the 14th Century (see Prominent members and descendants below).

As of the 15th Century, a branch of the family, bearing the inverted coat of arms, argent, three bougets sable, is recorded to have held "a modest manorial holding" at Thickley Punchardon, near Bishop Auckland.

Of this line, in the 17th century, John Lilburne and most of his family were key figures in the English Civil Wars. In his day, the family was noted to be "typical of the lesser gentry in the northern counties: its members often dull and uninspired, sitting in Parliament but saying little, engaging in the minutiae of local magisterial and commercial disputes."

== Prominent members ==
Pedigrees recorded at the visitations of the county palatine of Durham made by William Flower, Norroy king-of-arms, in 1575, by Richard St. George, Norroy king-of-arms, in 1615, and by William Dugdale, Norroy king-of-arms, in 1666.

=== Members of political or military significance ===
- Sir Robert Lilburn (possibly Hilburne) is recorded among 24 knights of Northumberland, charged on 13 October 1245 to assist in defining the border separating the kingdoms of England and Scotland, between Carham and Hadden, by the precept of Henry III.
- Sir William Lilburne was Lord Warden of the Middle Marches in the 13th Century and oldest recorded ancestor of the Thickley Punchardon family line:
  - Sir John Lilburne of Lilburn, Wooler and Beanly (1279-1355, grandson of the above William) was a knight who held numerous political and military offices during the first half of the 14th Century and took part in Thomas 2nd Earl of Lancaster's rebellion against King Edward II alongside Gilbert de Middleton, seizing castles and taking part in the capture of Bishop-elect Lewis de Beaumont.
  - Sir John Lilburn of Belford, Easington and Shawdon (died 1400, grandson of the above John) was a knight and close ally to Henry Percy, 1st Earl of Northumberland, who was godfather to his son Thomas (b. 1387). Sir John was twice taken prisoner following two battles against the Scots: the first in Carham (1370) leading an offensive against Scottish invaders; the second at the Battle of Otterburn (1388) alongside Henry "Hotspur" Percy, eldest son of the same Henry Percy who was godfather to Sir John's son.
  - Thomas Lilburne (born 1387, possibly son of the above John) was a representative for Northumberland in parliament under Henry VI in 1434.
  - John Lilburne (grandson of the above Sir John of Belford) was a Constable of Alnwick Castle in the 15th Century.
  - Bartholomew Lilburne (died 1562, third great nephew of the above John, Constable of Alnwick) was present during the Anglo-French summit between Henry VIII and Francois I at the Field of the Cloth of Gold in 1520, arrayed in a "numerous and valuable" body armour inherited as a Lilburn family heirloom by his son, John.
  - John "Freeborn" Lilburne (1614-1657, great grandson of the above Bartholomew) was a political Leveller and a key figure in the English Civil War, along with members of his immediate family:
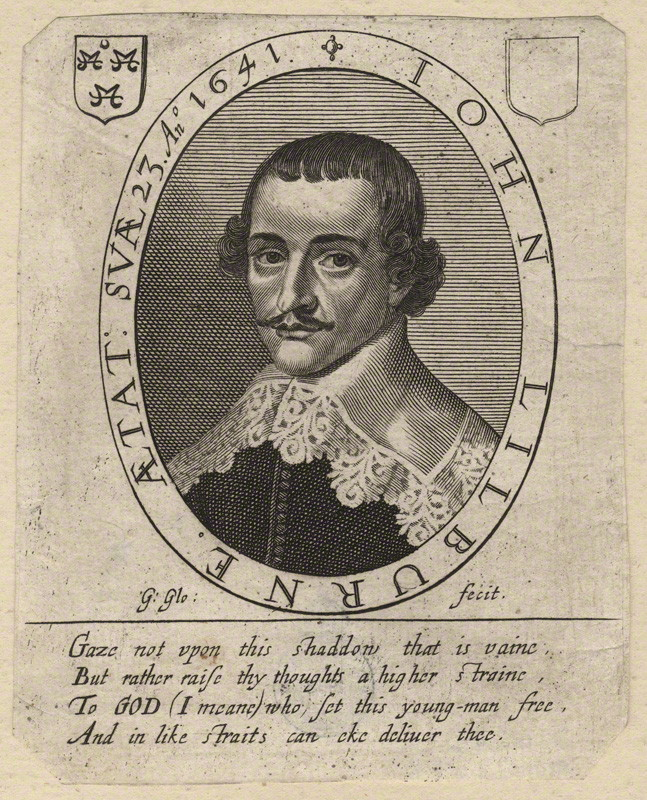
    John "Freeborn" Lilburne (1641)
    - Elizabeth Lilburne (active 1641–1660), born Elizabeth Dewell, was a Leveller and the wife of John "Freeborn" Lilburne.
    - Robert Lilburne (1613–1665, brother of John "Freeborn") was an English soldier, politician and signatory to the death warrant of King Charles I in 1649.
    - George Lilburne (c.1585 – 1666, uncle of John "Freeborn" and the above Robert) was an English politician who sat in the House of Commons in 1654 and supported the parliamentary cause in the English Civil War.
    - Thomas Lilburne (died 1665, 1st cousin of John "Freeborn") was an English politician and steward of the manor of Holm Cultram, having fought as an officer and major for the parliamentary army during the English Civil War.

== Prominent relatives ==
Distant relations worthy of note include:

- William Lilburne (born 1636, 1st cousin of John "Freeborn"), a barrister of Gray's Inn and second great grandfather of third US President Thomas Jefferson.
- and Isabel Lilburne, wife of John Lilburne (1st cousin of John "Freeborn" and brother of the above), a great niece of William Shakespeare.

== See also ==
- Nobles and magnates of England in the 13th Century
- Gilbert Middleton
- Dunstanburgh Castle
- House of Percy
- Battle of Otterburn
- Field of the Cloth of Gold
- Levellers
- English Civil War
