= Mansion House, Newcastle upon Tyne =

Municipal building in Newcastle upon Tyne, Tyne and Wear, England

The Mansion House
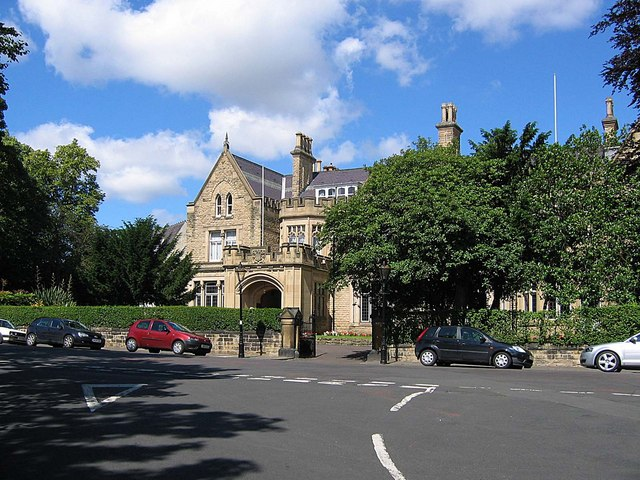
- The building in 2007

- Shown in Tyne and Wear
- 54.9847°N 1.6041°W
- Location: Fernwood Road, Newcastle upon Tyne

History
- Built: 1880

Site notes
- Architectural style: Gothic Revival style

The Mansion House is a historic building in Fernwood Road in Jesmond, Newcastle upon Tyne, a city in Tyne and Wear, in England. The building, which accommodates the official residence of the Lord Mayor of Newcastle upon Tyne, is a locally listed building.

== History ==
The first mansion house in Newcastle upon Tyne was a building on the Quayside which was built in brick and completed in 1691. Prince Frederick, Duke of York and Albany was entertained at the old mansion house in August 1795. By the mid-19th century it was in a dilapidated condition and it was used as a timber warehouse for a while until it was burnt down in 1895. (Note: The old mansion house was on the West Quayside, roughly where the Copthorne Hotel is now.)

The current structure was commissioned as a pair of private villas. The site selected by the developer was on open land on the north side of Fernwood Road. The two villas were designed in the Gothic Revival style, built in rubble masonry and were completed in 1880. The villa of the left was named Kelso House, while the villa on the right was named Thurso House. The design involved a main frontage of six bays (three bays for each villa) facing onto Fernwood Road. The left hand bay of Kelso House and the right hand bay of Thurso House were gabled and projected forward as pavilions. The right hand bay of Kelso House and the left hand bay of Thurso House (these bays adjoined each other) were fenestrated by bay windows on the ground floor and by bi-partite windows on the first floor and were surmounted by gablets, while the centre bays of each villa were fenestrated by bay windows on both floors but castellated at roof level.

Kelso House was originally the home of James Pyman, who was a shipowner. By the early 20th century, it had become the home of John Tweedie, who was a manager at shipbuilders, Wigham Richardson, and his son, George Frederick Tweedy, who was a director of shipbuilders, Swan Hunter.

Meanwhile, Thurso House was originally the home of a local shipping merchant, Benjamin John Sutherland. When the opportunity arose, in the early 20th century, the Sutherland family acquired Kelso House and amalgamated the two villas into one structure. A porte-cochère was added onto the front of the former Kelso House. In 1918, Benjamin's son, Arthur Sutherland, became Lord Mayor of Newcastle. He used it to host lavish parties and on his death, in 1953, he gifted the house to the city.

Queen Elizabeth II, accompanied by the Duke of Edinburgh, visited the mansion house, inspected a guard of honour from the 4th / 5th Battalion of the Royal Northumberland Fusiliers, and had lunch there with civic leaders on 29 October 1954. A Nobel Peace Prize, which had been presented to former Foreign Secretary, Arthur Henderson, for his work on disarmament in 1934, was stolen during a burglary at the mansion house in April 2013. A lock of hair, which had belonged to Cuthbert Collingwood, 1st Baron Collingwood, who was second-in command of the British fleet at the Battle of Trafalgar in October 1805, was also stolen.

Prince Andrew, Duke of York chose the building, in September 2015, for the launch of a campaign by the Children's Foundation, of which he was the patron, to help young people to improve their mental health. As well as being the official residence of the lord mayor, the building is used for weddings and civil partnership ceremonies.

Works of art in the mansion house include a portrait by Frank O. Salisbury of Sir Arthur Sutherland and a portrait by Alfred Priest of Arthur Henderson. There are also two paintings by James Wilson Carmichael, one depicting Queen Victoria and Prince Albert at Granton Pier in Edinburgh and the other depicting a cutter in distress to the south of Dunstanburgh Castle. There are also paintings by Henry Perlee Parker depicting local celebrations associated with the coronation of George IV and the coronation of William IV and Adelaide, and two paintings by Charles Napier Hemy, one depicting some fishermen trawling and the other depicting a scene at Falmouth, Cornwall. There is additionally a painting by Thomas Miles Richardson depicting the sheriff's procession to meet the judges in Newcastle.
