= School of Dental Sciences, Newcastle University =

Dental school in England

Coordinates: 54.9815°N 1.622°W

- Type: College
- Established: 1895 – Dental School established 1911 – Affiliated with the college of medicine University of Durham
- Affiliations: Newcastle University
- Pro-Vice-Chancellor: Professor David Burn
- Students: 500
- Location: Newcastle upon Tyne, Tyne & Wear, England
- Head of School: Professor Justin Durham
- Colours: Palatinate
- Website: ncl.ac.uk/dental

The School of Dental Sciences, Newcastle University and Hospital was founded in 1895 in the city of Newcastle upon Tyne, England. The School of Dental Sciences is part of Newcastle University and the Dental Hospital became part of the Royal Victoria Infirmary and Hospitals Trust in 1992.

== History ==
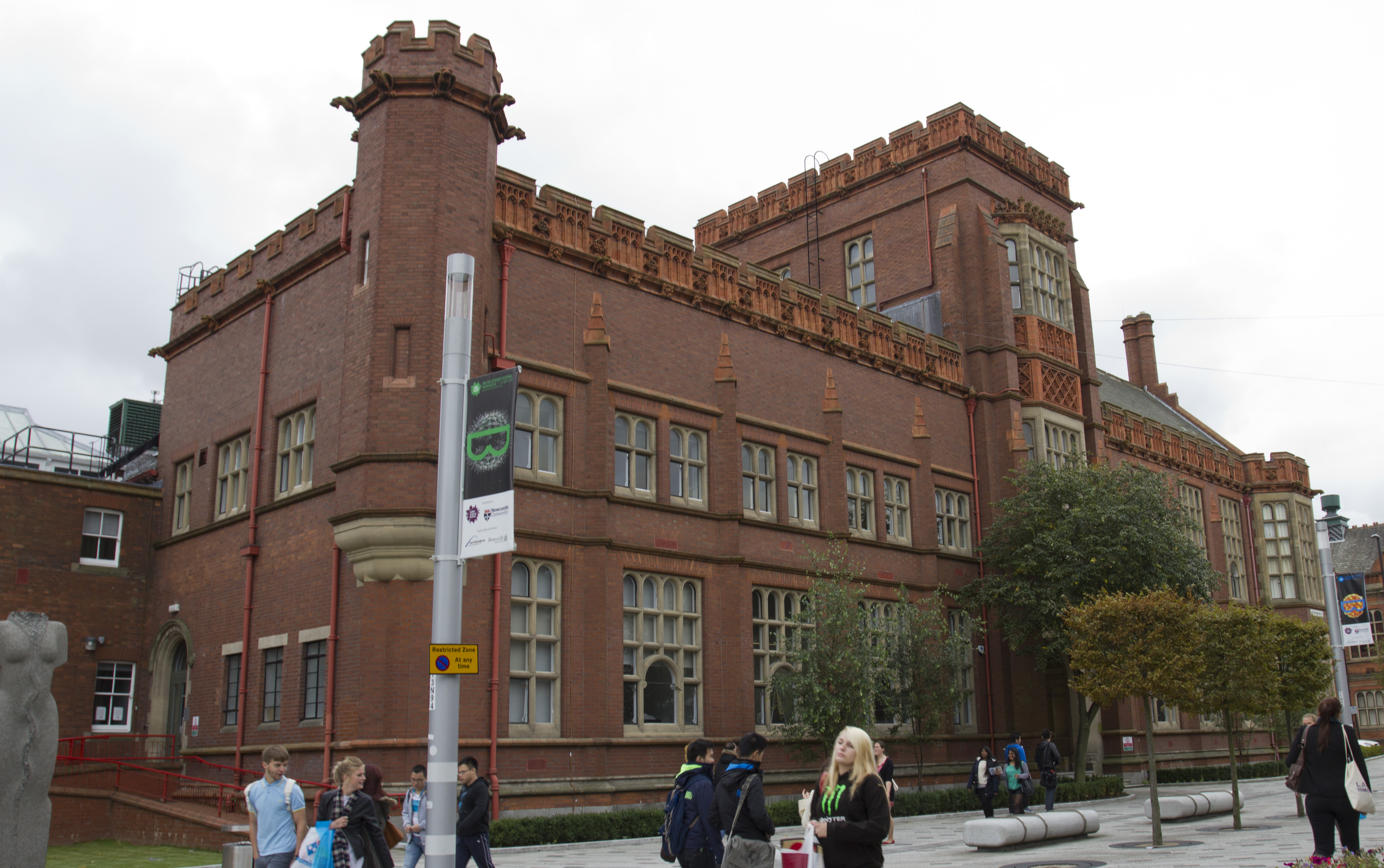
The former home of the Sutherland Dental School - now used by Northumbria University.

The Dental School and Hospital was founded by six dentists and opened on 22 April 1895 in order to provide dental treatment to the public. The Dental School and Hospital became affiliated with the College of Medicine in connection with Durham University from 1911 until 1937, after which it joined Armstrong College, to form King's College, Durham. In 1963 King's College became the University of Newcastle upon Tyne. The university now uses the name "Newcastle University".

Sir Arthur Sutherland gave £50,000 to develop the dental school, which was named the Sutherland Dental School in his honour on 29 May 1948. The Sutherland Building was used by the dental school until 1978 and is now part of Northumbria University - built in 1887, designed by Edward Joseph Hansom and Archibald Matthias Dunn, it is a Grade II listed building.

Between its foundation and 1978 the school and hospital occupied a number of sites around Newcastle City Centre, including Nelson Street, Percy Street, Northumberland Road before moving into its current purpose-built facilities on Richardson Road.

== Curriculum ==
The school has approximately 500 undergraduate and post-graduate students. Undergraduates studying Dentistry BDS (5 years) and Oral and Dental Health Sciences BSc (Hons) (3 years) form the largest body of students.

== Research ==
The majority of research undertaken in the School of Dental Sciences is organised by the Centre for Oral Health Research (COHR).

== Dental Society ==
The Dental Society is a student society for all dental students at Newcastle University. The society has its own bar named the Crown and Bridge, which is located within the dental school and hosts regular Friday evening events.
