= Arthur Sutherland =

English shipowner and philanthropist

Sir Arthur Sutherland Bt KBE DL JP DCL
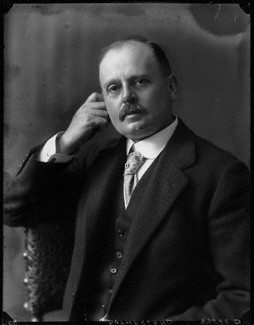
- Sir Arthur Sutherland, 1920

Lord Mayor of Newcastle upon Tyne
- In office 1918–1919

Personal details
- Born: Arthur Munro Sutherland; 2 October 1867 Newcastle upon Tyne, England
- Died: 29 March 1953 (aged 85)
- Occupation: Shipowner and philanthropist

Sir Arthur Munro Sutherland, 1st Baronet, KBE, DL, JP (2 October 1867 – 29 March 1953), of Hethpool House, Kirknewton, Northumberland, was an English shipowner and philanthropist.

Sutherland was the son of Benjamin John Sutherland, a shipping merchant of Thurso House, Newcastle upon Tyne. He was educated at the Royal Grammar School, Newcastle and in 1884 joined the shipbrokers Lindsay, Gracie & Co as a clerk. He left to open a steamer department in his father's firm, later turning it into a successful cargo shipping business, B. J. Sutherland & Co. He was chairman of that firm and several other shipping operators. Later, Sutherland was owner of the Newcastle Chronicle newspaper between 1920 and 1925.

In 1910 Sutherland was elected to Newcastle City Council and served as Sheriff of Newcastle in 1916–1917 and Lord Mayor of Newcastle upon Tyne in 1918–1919. He was also a Justice of the Peace for the city for many years and chairman of the governors of his old school, to which he donated considerable sums of money. In 1936, the Durham University College of Medicine and Armstrong College were about to merge to form King's College in the University of Durham and he donated £200,000 to establish a new medical school at the newly named King's College, Newcastle upon Tyne, now the equivalent to £6 million. Later he gave £50,000 to develop the dental school which had been founded in 1895, which was named the Sutherland Dental School in his honour, and afterwards used his coat of arms and motto Sans Peur (Fearless) as its badge. He served as High Sheriff of Northumberland in 1943.

In 1943 Sutherland, then a director of the Blyth Dry Docks and Shipbuilding Company, was charged alongside his friend and neighbour, Newcastle Alderman Robert Stanley Dalgleish, managing director of the company, with conspiring to bribe Admiralty official Charles James Butt. After a five-day trial at Leeds, Sutherland was found not guilty; Dalgleish and Butt were convicted and jailed. Sutherland was the last private owner of Dunstanburgh Castle which he purchased in 1919 and donated to the nation in 1929. After using it as a home to entertain lavish parties, Sutherland bequeathed his town house, Thurso House in Jesmond in Newcastle upon Tyne, to the city for use as the new official Mansion House. Sutherland also owned many properties in London. He once owned Close House in Northumberland.

Sutherland was appointed Knight Commander of the Order of the British Empire (KBE) in the 1920 civilian war honours for his services as Lord Mayor and created a baronet in the 1921 Birthday Honours. He was also made a Commander of the Order of St. Olav in 1943 by King Haakon VII of Norway.

He married Fanny Linda Haggie in 1893. They had four children including Sir Benjamin Ivan Sutherland, 2nd Bt. Following her death in 1937, he married Ella Bertha Louise Christensen.

== Sources ==
- Obituary, The Times, 30 March 1953

Baronetage of the United Kingdom
New creation	Baronet (of Dunstanburgh Castle); 1921–1953	Succeeded by Ivan Sutherland
