= Dunstanburgh Castle (painting) =

Painting by J. M. W. Turner

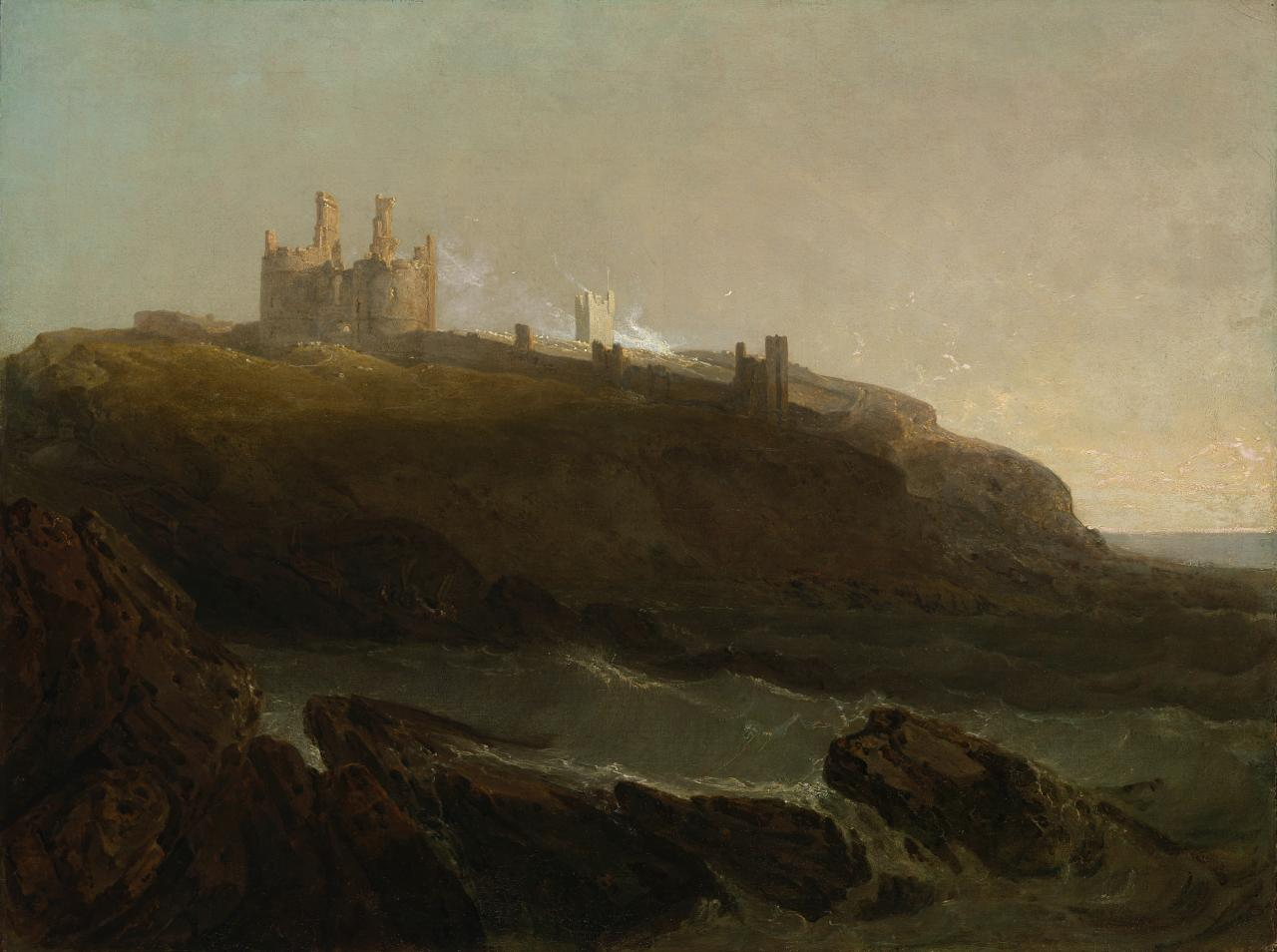
- Artist: J.M.W. Turner
- Year: 1798
- Type: Oil on canvas, landscape painting
- Dimensions: 92.2 cm × 123.2 cm (36.3 in × 48.5 in)
- Location: National Gallery of Victoria, Melbourne
- Website: www.ngv.vic.gov.au/...4423/

Dunstanburgh Castle is a 1798 landscape painting by the British artist J.M.W. Turner. It features a view of Dunstanburgh Castle on the coast of Northumberland in Northern England at sunrise following a stormy night.

Turner had toured the area sketching prominent landmarks in the region. The painting was displayed at the Royal Academy Exhibition of 1798 at Somerset House in London, accompanied with some lines from James Thomson's poem The Seasons. It was the first oil painting he sold at the Academy's Summer Exhibitions. Today it is in the collection of the National Gallery of Victoria in Melbourne, having been acquired in 1888 though a gift by the Duke of Westminster.

== See also ==
- List of paintings by J. M. W. Turner

== Bibliography ==
- Bailey, Anthony. J.M.W. Turner: Standing in the Sun. Tate Enterprises Ltd, 2013.
- Kelly, Frank. J.M.W. Turner. Tate Publishing, 2007.
- Moyle, Franny. Turner: The Extraordinary Life and Momentous Times of J. M. W. Turner. Penguin Books, 2016.
- Reynolds, Graham. Turner. Thames & Hudson, 2022.
