= Gilbert Middleton =

English rebel

Gilbert Middleton (died 1318) was an English knight with lands in Northumberland who rebelled and was executed for treason.

Gilbert was a son of Gilbert of Middleton and grandson of the Lord Chancellor Richard of Middleton. His father was dead by 1291, when he was still a minor. He was placed under the wardship of the royal squire William Felton. In 1300, he attained his majority and took part in the English invasion of Scotland.

By 1313, Gilbert was a knight of the royal household in the garrison at Berwick Castle. In 1315, he was posted to Alnwick Castle. He was still in the royal service in early 1317, when he received wages for himself and his retinue. On 1 September 1317, however, he attacked a party that included the bishop-elect of Durham, Louis de Beaumont; his brother, Henry de Beaumont; and two cardinals, Gaucelin de Jean and Luca Fieschi. He imprisoned the Beaumonts in Mitford Castle, but let the cardinals go. Gilbert was joined in rebellion by fellow household knights John de Lilburne, Walter Selby and Goscelin d'Eyville. On 17 October, Louis de Beaumont was also freed. The rebels extorted 500 marks from the bishopric of Durham for an alleged "transgression committed against" Gilbert. In December, William Felton, the son of Gilbert's former guardian, captured Mitford Castle and Gilbert by subterfuge.

The motives for Gilbert's rebellion remain uncertain. He may have been acting with the connivance of the Scots, still at war with England. Earl Thomas of Lancaster, too, may have been in on the plan. Gilbert was sent by sea to London, where he was tried before the king for treason on 26 January 1318. In part because of his status as a household knight and the status of his victims—cardinals on a diplomatic mission—he was hanged, drawn and quartered.

== Bibliography ==
- Maddicott, John (1970). Thomas of Lancaster, 1307–1322: A Study in the Reign of Edward II. Oxford University Press.
- Middleton, Arthur E. (1918). Sir Gilbert de Middleton and the Part He Took in the Rebellion in the North of England in 1317. Mawson Swan and Morgan Limited.
- Prestwich, Michael (2003). "Gilbert de Middleton and the Attack on the Cardinals, 1317". In Timothy Reuter (ed.). Warriors and Churchmen in the High Middle Ages: Essays Presented to Karl Leyser. Hambledon Press. pp. 179–194.
- Prestwich, Michael (2004). "Middleton, Sir Gilbert". Oxford Dictionary of National Biography (online ed.). Oxford University Press. doi:10.1093/ref:odnb/53089. (Subscription, Wikipedia Library access or UK public library membership required.)
