= Lord Armstrong =

Lord Armstrong may refer to:

- Iain Armstrong, Lord Armstrong (born 1956), Senator of the College of Justice in Scotland
- Robert Armstrong, Baron Armstrong of Ilminster (1927–2020), British former civil servant
- William Armstrong, Baron Armstrong of Sanderstead (1915–1980), British civil servant and banker
- One of the hereditary Barons Armstrong:
  - William Armstrong, 1st Baron Armstrong (1810–1900)
  - William Watson-Armstrong, 1st Baron Armstrong (1863–1941)
  - William Watson-Armstrong, 2nd Baron Armstrong (1892–1972)
  - William Watson-Armstrong, 3rd Baron Armstrong (1919–1987)

== See also ==
- Baron Armstrong
