= Fisherman's Lodge =

Former country house in Newcastle upon Tyne

Fisherman's Lodge / Deep Dene House
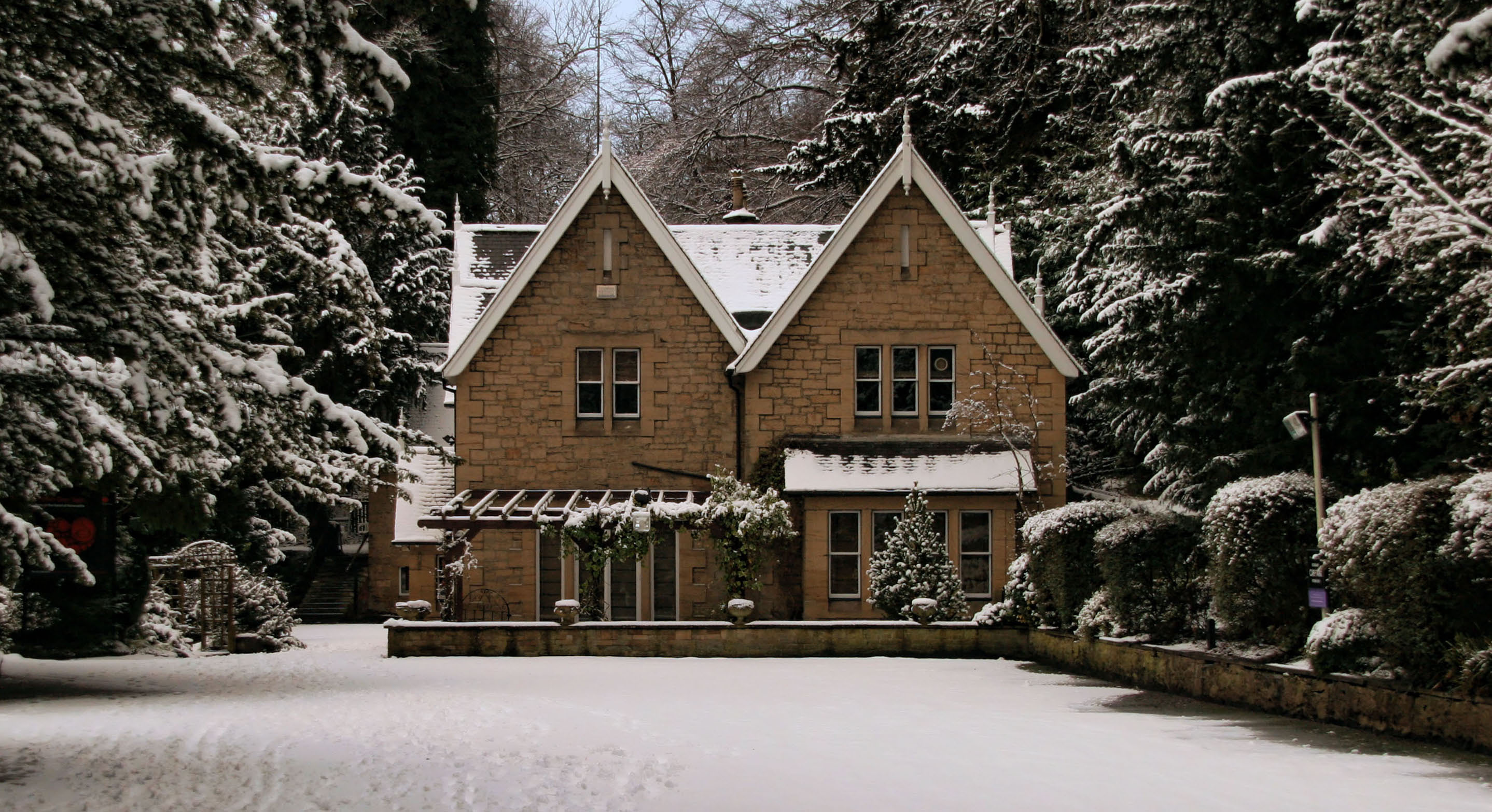
- Deep Dene House

- Location in Tyne and Wear

General information
- Location: Tyne and Wear, England, UK
- Coordinates: 54.9959°N 1.5951°W
- OS grid: NZ260668

The Fisherman's Lodge, also known as Deep Dene House, is a mansion house at Jesmond Dene, Newcastle upon Tyne, England. The house, which is now in a dilapidated condition, was one of several large houses built in Jesmond Dene in the mid-19th century.

== History ==
The house was commissioned by Lord Armstrong on his own land to provide accommodation for senior staff working at his company, W.G. Armstrong & Company, before they bought their own homes. (Note: This was not the home of Lord Armstrong, whose nearby house has been demolished, though its Banqueting Hall survives. However Armstrong did landscape and develop the adjacent Jesmond Dene into a woodland park and garden.) Originally known as Heaton Cottage, it was built in stone and was completed in around 1850. It became the home of the Scottish physicist, Andrew Noble, in 1861 and was used as a venue to entertain local gentry such as John and Albany Hancock before Noble moved to a much larger property, Jesmond Dene House, in 1871. Lord Armstrong gifted Heaton Cottage to the City of Newcastle in 1883. His intention was that the income from the building and three other "endowment properties" in the area would be used to support the upkeep of Jesmond Dene and the Jesmond Dene Banqueting Hall.

In 1979, the restauranteur, Franco Cetoloni, and his wife, Pamela, established a restaurant known as the Fisherman's Lodge in the building. Cetoloni appointed an experienced chef, Terence Laybourne, manager of the restaurant at that time. The business was acquired by a former Sage Group director, Tom Maxfield, in 2000, and by Jamie Howell and Alan O'Kane in 2009. The restaurant got into financial difficulties in March 2011, and then closed in 2013. The house was badly damaged by fire, potentially caused by arson, on the night of 9 October 2016.

A charity, Urban Green Newcastle, became responsible for the city's parks in 2019 but, after failing to restore the buildings including the Fisherman's Lodge, handed the parks back to the city in November 2025.
