= William Watson-Armstrong, 3rd Baron Armstrong =

English landowner and peer (1919–1987)

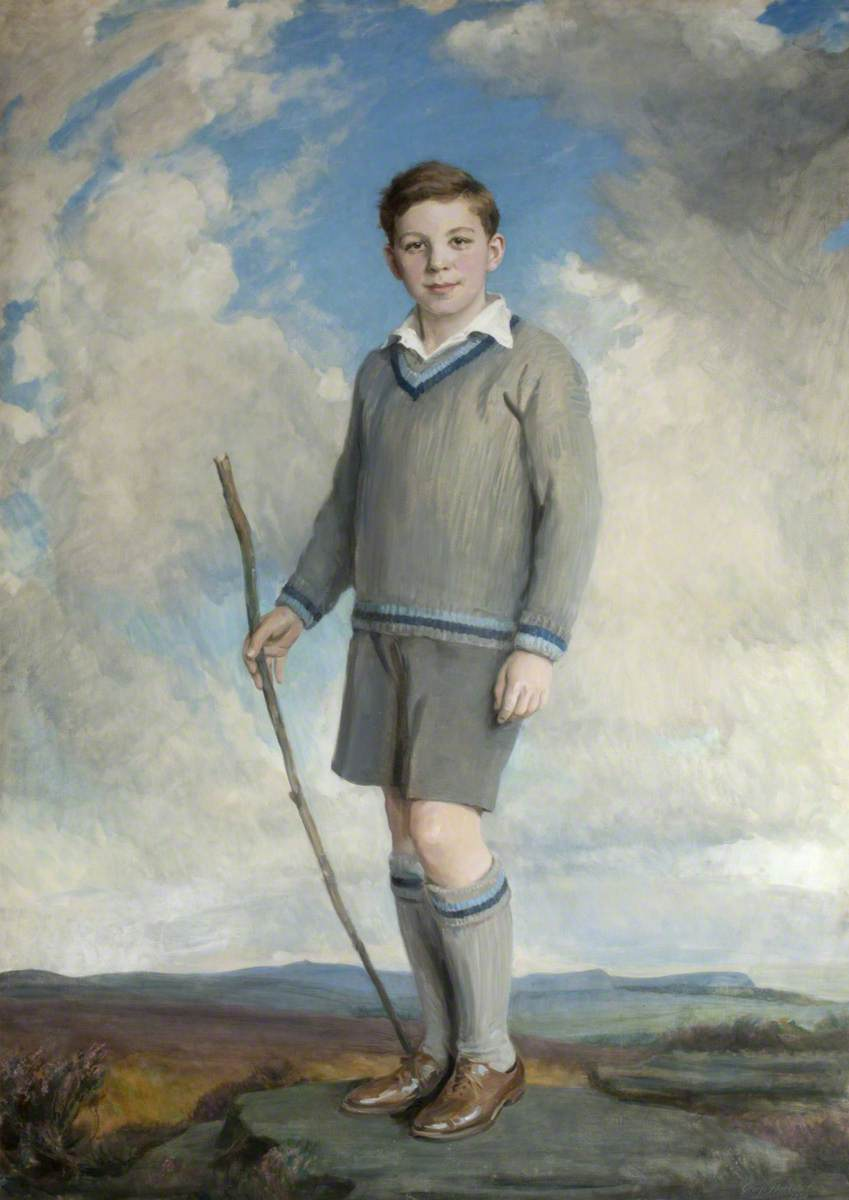
William Watson-Armstrong as a Young Boy

William Henry Cecil John Robin Watson-Armstrong, 3rd Baron Armstrong (6 March 1919 – 1 October 1987) was an English landowner and peer, a member of the House of Lords from 1972 until his death.

Born at Jesmond Dene House, Newcastle-upon-Tyne, Armstrong was the only son of William Watson-Armstrong, 2nd Baron Armstrong and his wife Zaida Cecile Drummond-Wolff. He was educated at Eton and Trinity College, Cambridge.

On 6 July 1972 he succeeded his father as Baron Armstrong in the peerage of the United Kingdom, an honour recreated for his grandfather, William Watson-Armstrong, 1st Baron Armstrong, in 1903, who had inherited the Bamburgh Castle and Cragside estates of his great‑uncle, William Armstrong, 1st Baron Armstrong, but not his peerage.

Armstrong decided to live at Bamburgh and gave Cragside, with 911 acres, to the British government in lieu of death duties. In 1977 the house was transferred to the National Trust through the National Land Fund, and Armstrong gave the Trust an endowment.

On 16 August 1947, Armstrong married Baroness Maria-Teresa Chiodelli-Manzoni, a daughter of Italian General Baron Fabrizio Enea Chiodelli-Manzoni. They had no children of their own and adopted a son and daughter.

On Armstrong's death in October 1987, the peerage again became extinct, but the Bamburgh Castle estate passed to his adopted son Francis Watson-Armstrong.

== Arms ==
Coat of arms of William Watson-Armstrong, 3rd Baron Armstrong

Crest
1st a dexter arm embowed in armour couped at the shoulder and encircled at the elbow by a wreat of oak the hand grasping all Proper (Armstrong) 2nd in front of an arm embowed in armour Proper garnished Or holding a palm branch Vert a martlet between two crosses bottony Gules (Watson).
Escutcheon
Quarterly 1st & 4th Gules in fess a tilting spear Or headed Argent between two dexter arms embowed in armour couped at the shoulder fesswise Proper the hand extended also Proper (Armstrong) 2nd & 3rd Argent a fess raguly Gules between two crosses bottony in chief and a martlet in base Gules (Watson).
Supporters
On either side a figure habited as a smith holding with the exterior hand a hammer resting on the shoulder all Proper.
Motto
Fortis In Armis (Strong In Arms)

== Notes ==
Peerage of the United Kingdom
Preceded by William John Montagu Watson-Armstrong	Baron Armstrong; 1972–1987	Extinct
