= Armstrong effect =

Production of static electricity by friction of a fluid

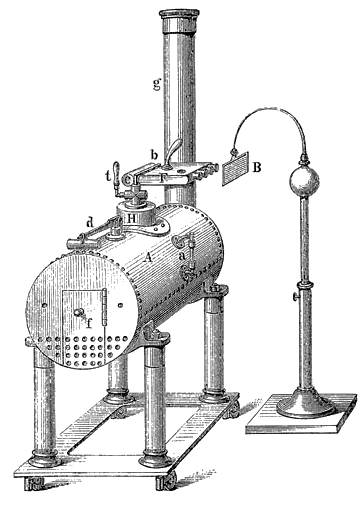
Armstrong's hydroelectric machine

The Armstrong effect is the physical process by which static electricity is produced by the friction of a fluid. It was first discovered in 1840 when an electrical spark resulted from water droplets being swept out by escaping steam from a boiler. The effect is named after William Armstrong, who later became 1st Baron Armstrong, who was one of several people involved in discovering the effect and investigating the processes involved. Using this principle, Armstrong went on to invent what he called the Armstrong hydroelectric machine, which, despite its name, generated static electricity and not hydroelectric power.

== Discovery ==
At Seghill, near Newcastle upon Tyne in northern England, the Cramlingham Colliery railway had a 28-horsepower (21 kW) winding engine to haul the coal wagons. In September 1840, Patterson, the engine driver, noticed a slight leak of steam from beside the safety valve. Fearing that the boiler pressure was too high, he reached into the cooling cloud of steam to release the valve and felt a tingling in his fingers as he touched it. He was unable to see clearly what was happening, so he initially thought he had hit his fingers. However, for the next few days, he did simple experiments and eventually told his colleagues, who experienced the same phenomenon. Patterson then discovered that by moving his finger slowly towards the valve, he could see a spark. Word of this spread around by word of mouth, and one theory was that the boiler was at risk of exploding because the fire outside the boiler was somehow penetrating inside. The builder of the engine decided that it was safe, but told two associates, Hugh Pattinson and Henry Smith, who discovered that the effect was increased into creating sparks of 3/8 inch (10 mm) if a metal shovel was held in the steam and the point of a penknife blade held near the valve.

Armstrong, who at the time was a solicitor with an interest in science and engineering, became involved and wrote to Michael Faraday concerning Patterson: "he was greatly surprised by the appearance of a brilliant spark, which passed between the lever and his hand, and was accompanied by a violent wrench in his arms, wholly unlike anything he had experienced before". Faraday replied, saying he could not be certain whether the effect was due to evaporation or whether it had some chemical cause, and suggesting further experiments that could be performed. Faraday published these letters, along with one from Pattinson, in the London and Edinburgh Philosophical Magazine. A long correspondence ensued. By November 1840, Armstrong succeeded in creating 2-inch (50 mm) sparks and determined that the sparks were created where the steam was released into the atmosphere and were not emerging from further back in the boiler. During this time, Pattinson had created 4-inch (100 mm) sparks but then dropped out of the investigations. It was then realised that the effect had actually been observed much earlier by Alessandro Volta, who recorded that a red-hot cinder produced an electrical disturbance when dropped into water in a metal pan.

== Development of the technique ==
Armstrong continued his work through 1842, finding a similar effect with compressed air rather than steam, and constructing an "evaporating apparatus" with a specially designed friction nozzle able to produce 12-inch (300 mm) sparks. The electrical charge on the steam was positive, although Faraday discovered that adding turpentine to the water produced a negative polarity.

== Armstrong hydroelectric machine ==
In 1843, Armstrong designed a full-scale electrostatic generator on electrically insulating legs. These machines, with 46 steam jets, he called his "hydroelectric generators". One was set up at the Royal Polytechnic Institution in London, and another was exported to the USA. These were fearsome machines, making a deafening noise, and the 22-inch (560 mm) sparks knocked out a dog who got too close and killed a large man. In its day, it was the most powerful way of generating static electricity and was remarkable for having no moving parts. At a demonstration at Newcastle's Lit and Phil, the crowds were so great that Armstrong could not gain entry through the door and had to climb in through a window, this requiring two ladders. As a result of his endeavours, on the recommendation of Faraday and Charles Wheatstone, he was elected as fellow of the Royal Society in 1846. Continuing with his scientific and engineering interests, he went on to become a major industrialist in hydraulic engineering, military artillery and electricity generation.

== Practical applications ==
When he was 82, Armstrong regained his interest in electrostatics. By this time, the Wimshurst machine had been invented, and Armstrong confirmed that this was the superior design for creating static electricity for his experiments. Armstrong's machine's main practical application had been as a spectacle to attract crowds. However, in modern times, the Armstrong effect is taken advantage of in some paint sprays to polarise the paint, thus reducing the amount of paint required and allowing it to stick better in sharp angles. On the other hand, the effect has had damaging consequences, partly because it was obscure and little known. In 1969 three oil tankers were damaged by explosions in their tanks while they were being cleaned using water jets from high-pressure hoses. On a much smaller scale, a leak from an aerosol spray might ignite gases escaping from it if they are flammable.
