= Jesmond Dene =

Park in Newcastle upon Tyne, England

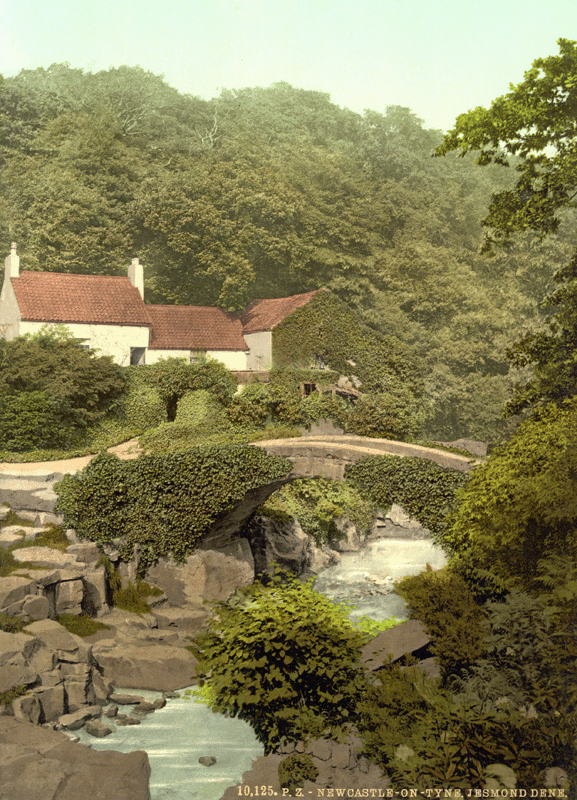
- Jesmond Dene c. 1900. The mill in the background is now ruinous.

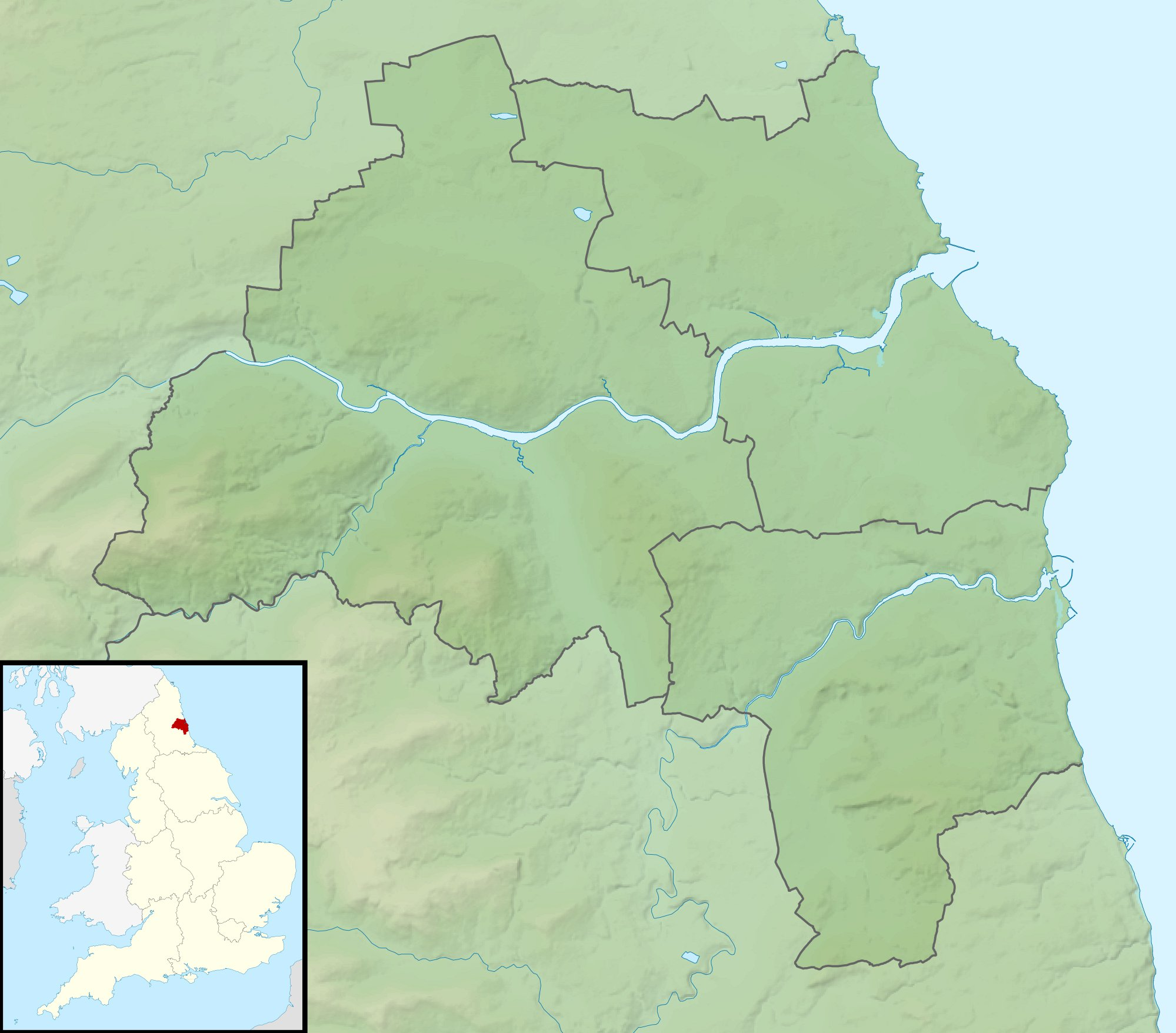
- Location within Tyne and Wear
- Location: Newcastle upon Tyne, UK
- OS grid: NZ261663
- Coordinates: 54.99°N 1.59°W
- Owner: Newcastle City Council
- Manager: Urban Green Newcastle
- Website: urbangreennewcastle.org/our-green-spaces/parks/jesmond-dene/

Jesmond Dene, a public park in the east end of Newcastle upon Tyne, England, occupies the narrow steep-sided valley of a small river known as the Ouseburn, flowing south to join the River Tyne. In north-east England, such valleys are commonly known as denes; the name 'Jesmond' meaning 'mouth of the Ouseburn'.

Lord Armstrong and his wife, of the now-demolished Jesmond Dean [sic] house nearby, first laid out the park during the 1860s. The design is intended to reflect a rural setting, with woodland, crags, waterfalls and pools. Lord Armstrong gave the park, together with his Banqueting Hall, to the people of Newcastle in 1883 and the park opened to the public in the following year. It is now owned by Newcastle City Council. The current Jesmond Dene House adjoining the dene was the mansion of Armstrong's business partner Andrew Noble. It is now a luxury hotel.

The (now closed to road traffic) iron-constructed Armstrong Bridge spans the south end of the Dene and hosts Jesmond Food Market every first and third Saturday of the month. The building of a replacement road and tunnel, the Cradlewell By-pass, was the subject of a road protest camp around 1993, due to the destruction of many 200-year-old trees.

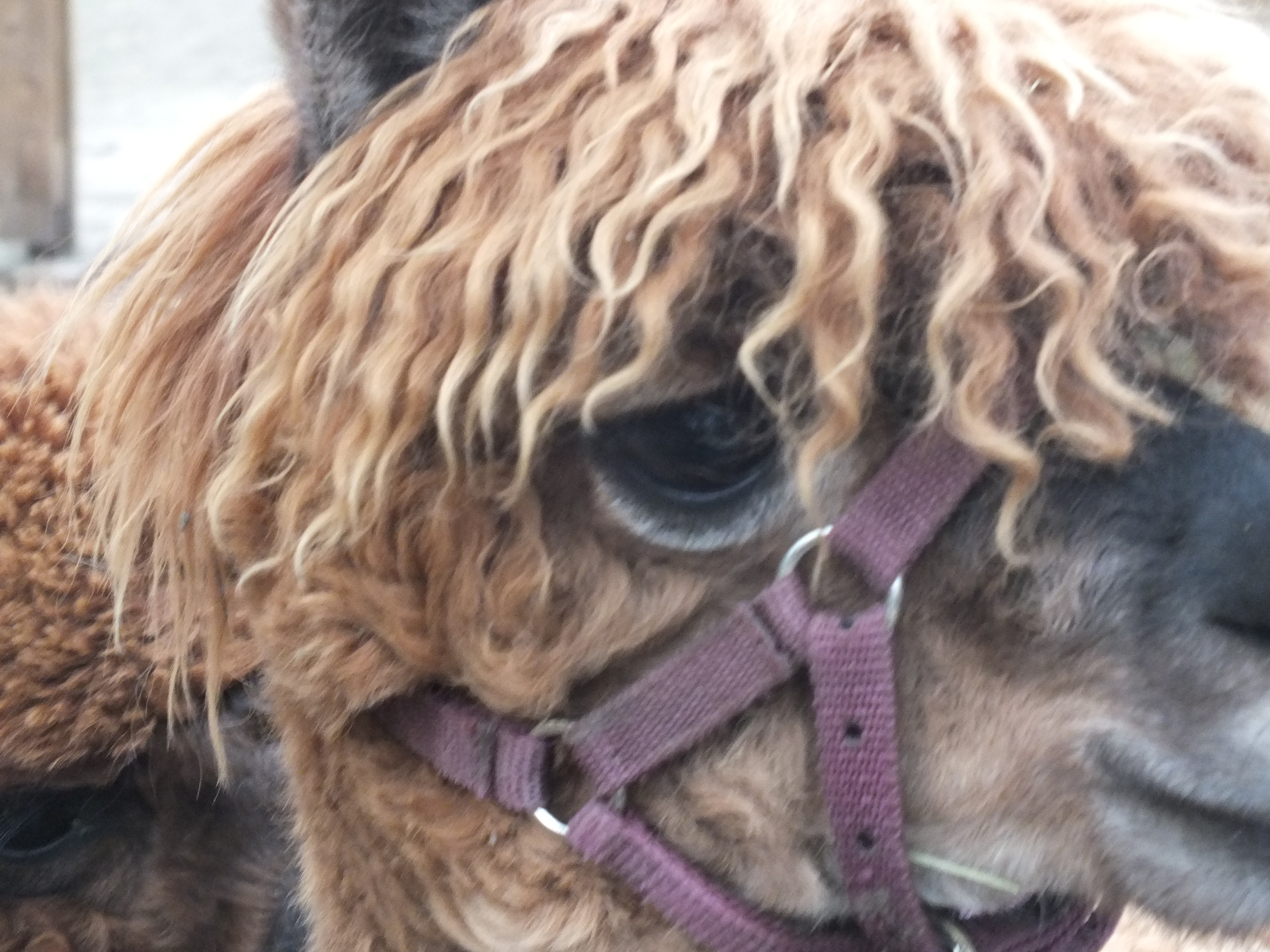
Alpaca examining the visitors to Pets' Corner

Jesmond Dene contains a free-entry petting zoo known as "Pets' Corner", which has been a popular family attraction since the 1960s.

Jesmond Dene is home to Newcastle's oldest religious building, St Mary's Chapel. The chapel, now in ruins, was once a site of much significance, attracting a great number of pilgrims.

The park is supported by a group called 'Friends of Jesmond Dene' which provides funds for small projects to improve the park. There is also a group of Volunteer Rangers which carries out physical work tidying the paths, picking up litter, cutting back shrubs and other maintenance tasks.

The dawn chorus of Jesmond Dene has been professionally recorded and has been used in various workplace and hospital rehabilitation facilities.

In 2011, the field area and pets corner were redeveloped. The redevelopment included a new road and a bridge over the Ouseburn river.

In 2012, during excessively wet weather, a landslide occurred on the east side of the Dene, near the Old Mill. The landslide covered several footpaths running along the hillside.

In July 2014, the Old Mill in the Dene was vandalised with graffiti tags, which have since been removed.

The Fisherman's Lodge Restaurant in the Dene was badly damaged by fire on the night of 9 October 2016.

On 1 April 2019, control and upkeep of Jesmond Dene, along with other Newcastle parks, was passed from Newcastle City Council to a newly created charitable trust, Urban Green Newcastle. On 1 March 2025, control and upkeep of Jesmond Dene, along with the rest of the parks of Newcastle, was returned to Newcastle City Council.
