= William Armstrong (corn merchant) =

English corn merchant and local politician

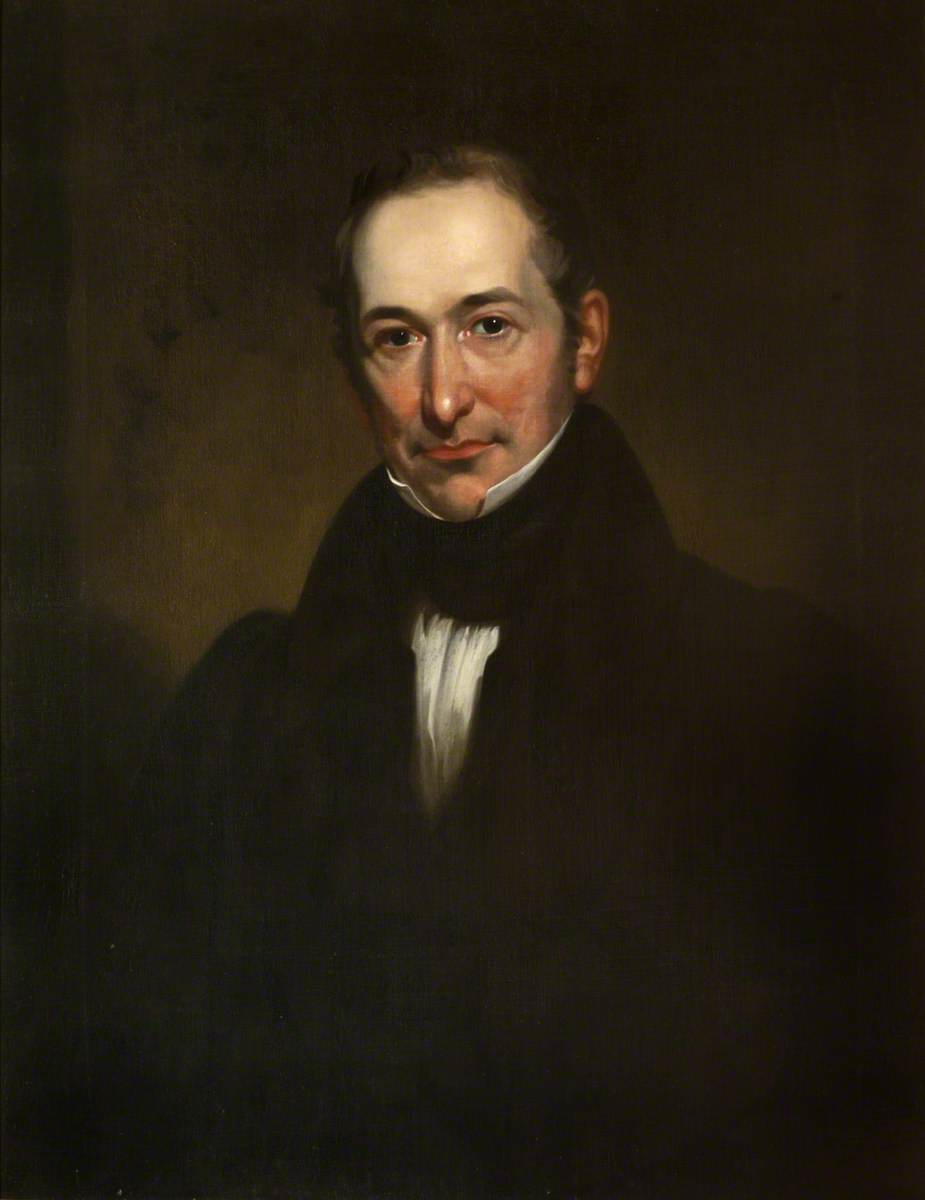
- Armstrong in an oil painting held by the National Trust at Cragside

Mayor of Newcastle Upon Tyne
- In office 1850–1851
- Preceded by: Joseph Crawhall
- Succeeded by: James Hodgson

Personal details
- Born: William Armstrong; 1778 Wreay, Cumbria
- Died: 1857 (age 79)
- Spouse: Ann Potter
- Occupation: Corn merchant

William Armstrong (1778–1857) was an English corn merchant and local politician of Newcastle-upon-Tyne. He was also the father of prominent industrialist William Armstrong, 1st Baron Armstrong.

Armstrong was born in a small Cumberland village, where he came into acquaintance with the wealthy Losh family. These contacts were to help him gain a commercial foothold when he moved to Newcastle-upon-Tyne, joining a Losh-owned corn firm. Upon the proprietors' bankruptcy, Armstrong collected together the funds to establish his own corn firm: Armstrong, & Co.

Financially established, Armstrong was able to pursue his own interests. Armstrong took part local reformist politics. He and his allies, James Losh and Armorer Donkin, took up causes within Newcastle. Armstrong attempted to reform the administration of the River Tyne, to limited success. He entertained high society at the Newcastle Literary and Philosophical Society, warmly supporting its growth. Armstrong also pursued a recreational mathematical interest, contributing to some minor journals, and leaving a large collection of mathematical volumes to the society.

== Early life and education ==
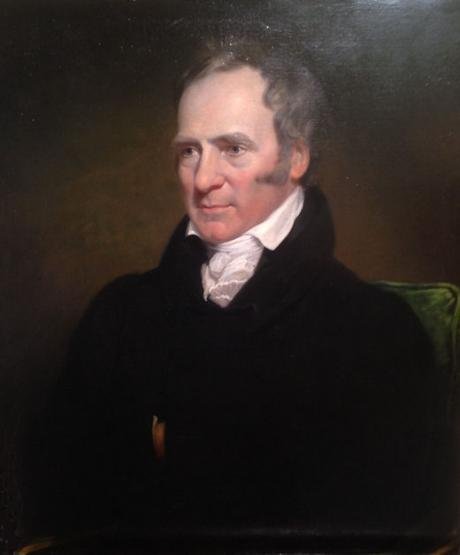
James Losh (1763–1833), friend of Armstrong, member of the powerful Losh family, and fellow reformer of Newcastle.

Very little is known of Armstrong's early life. He was born in 1778, in the small village of Wreay, Cumbria, the son of a local shoemaker, and descended from a long line of yeomen. Armstrong attended the local village school, developing an early interest in mathematics, and attending alongside the children of John Losh, from the local Losh family: James (1763–1833), George (1766–1846) and William. The Losh family were powerful in this area. They were descended from the Arloshes, who had occupied the area for over two centuries, and resided in the large local mansion known as Woodside. Though the family were never honoured with titles, John Losh was known locally as "the big black squire" of Woodside. At this school, Armstrong was tutored by the local priest, William Gaskin, an eccentric man whom James Losh recalled as "uncouth in his manners and abrupt and confused in his manner of speaking", if also "a man of considerable powers of mind". Armstrong was also likely introduced to the celebrated mathematics teacher, John Dawson, by John and James Losh, who both later studied under him at Sedbergh School.

== Career as a corn merchant ==
In the mid-1790s, Armstrong arrived in Newcastle upon Tyne, promptly joining Losh, Lubbren & Co, a Quayside firm of corn merchants, as a clerk in the firm's counting house. George Losh was here, a senior partner in the firm, alongside the naturalised German merchant, John Diedrich Lubbren. The Losh family had grown powerful in Newcastle, with George also owning the local Newcastle Fire Office and Water Company, and his brothers - William and James - later becoming influential members of Tyneside's high society. In Summer 1803, the firm went bankrupt, when the abrupt collapse of the Newcastle banking house, Surtrees and Burdon, left George Losh and his partners financially embarrassed, the first of a series of failures that led Losh to migrate to France. Armstrong - then married and with one daughter - was forced to rely on financial support from his wife's family, Diedrich Lubbren, and possibly William Losh, using the funds to start his own enterprise in the corn industry: "Armstrong & Co., merchants, Cowgate".

== Career as a local politician ==
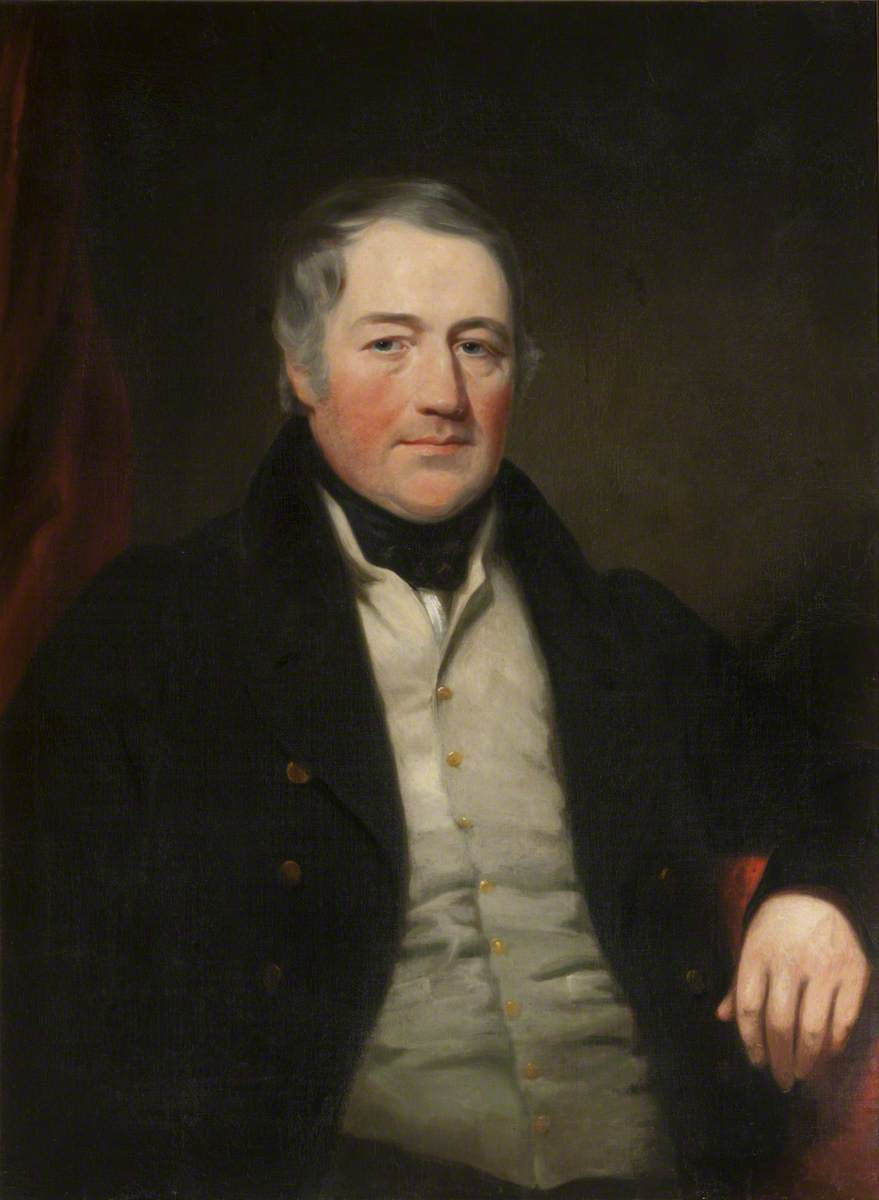
Armorer Donkin (1779–1851), close friend of Armstrong and fellow reformer of Newcastle.

In August 1824, Armstrong and Armorer Donkin, a close friend of Armstrong's, both with a passion for reform in their city, were appointed by the Moot Hall to a committee to recommend the construction of either a horse-drawn railway or canal between Newcastle and Carlisle. Armstrong clearly saw the importance of his duty, noting: "We can bring corn from the Cape of Good Hope to Newcastle cheaper than we can convey it between Newcastle and Carlisle". Armstrong was cautious of a railway system, as a relatively new form of transport, referring to the plan as "spiritless". This argument did not meet with agreement on the committee, and the following year, it recommended the construction of the Newcastle & Carlisle Railway, headed by the more radical reformer, James Losh. This preference has variously been suggested as evidence of his innate fear of new technology, or his rational preference as a cautious corn merchant, wanting his stock to be carried in more safe and established modes of transport.

In 1831, Armstrong, James Losh, and Donkin attended Northumberland reform meeting in support of the Great Reform Act - a wide-ranging democratic act of parliament - and in support of a resolution against the House of Lords, which had vigorously opposed the act's passage. After the Municipal Corporations Act 1835, which reformed the governance of local boroughs, Armstrong was elected as a reformist candidate in the Newcastle town council, an office he attained with a substantial majority against the reactionary Matthew Anderson. At the council, Armstrong voted in favour of the removal of the furniture and fittings of the Mayor's residence, and the end of the tradition of the Mayor's feasts, held at the public expense. His success didn't sustain in the following, 1839 election, where he was defeated by a landslide by the "more formidable opponent", George Palmer, losing his seat 38 votes to 8. Upon Palmer's retirement, Armstrong returned to the office in 1842 unopposed. In January 1849, upon the vacancy of a seat, he was unanimously elected an alderman of Newcastle. The aldermen were not so harmonious when, a few months later, he was proposed to be made the mayor of Newcastle, as the queen was expected to visit the town soon. The better known Joseph Crawhall II, a watercolourist, was selected in his stead to preside over the royal visit. By November the following year, Armstrong was elected mayor; he led a mayoralty described by local historian Richard Welford as "quiet and uneventful", in which Armstrong led the "usual festivities" and "presided over the usual number of public meetings".

Armstrong was generally a progressive, but began as a more independent, and sometimes reactionary, politician, remaining a "timid reformer" even afterwards, according to Welford. In the 1832 general election he voted for both Tory and Whig Newcastle MP candidates. By the 1835 election, he was decidedly in favour of the Whigs. In 1837, he was divided between two candidates - Charles John Bigge and William Ord - after which he expressly favoured Whig (or, later, Liberal) candidates. One political concern he held fast, in spite of his reformist reputation, was that against the abolition of the Corn Laws - a set of taxes on imported food, which kept domestic grain prices high. He spoke out vigorously against any such reform in 1845, not improbably out of self-interest as a corn merchant.

While a local politician, Armstrong primarily concerned himself with the management of the River Tyne. Before the 1835 Act, the council had been derided for its neglect of the river, and many hoped the new council would attend to its problems. In his first term as councillor Armstrong issued a polemical pamphlet of his observations on the river's improvement, and in 1843 (upon the previous chairman's death) promptly took over the local River Committee. Despite the many heated debates Armstrong presided over, "neither he nor the council's appointed engineer had the skills needed to enable a programme of improvement to be pursued with any degree of confidence", according to Stafford M. Linsley, writing for the Oxford Dictionary of National Biography. Armstrong's incompetence, as well as the widespread belief that the Committee's funds were being inappropriately used, led to agitation against the Committee, especially from those heavily economically invested in the river (for example, among the residents of North and South Shields). Armstrong held out, continuing his demands for reform, which would invariably meet with the formidable opposition of the council until the River Tyne Improvement Act 1850 (13 & 14 Vict. c. lxiii) was passed. This act dismantled the council's authority over the river, instead putting it under the control of a group of commissioners. The bill was put forth to the House of Commons in June 1850, naming Armstrong as one of the life commissioners, but, after complaints from the council Armstrong's name was substituted for that of William Rutherford Hunter before the bill was presented to the Lords.

== Personal life and death ==
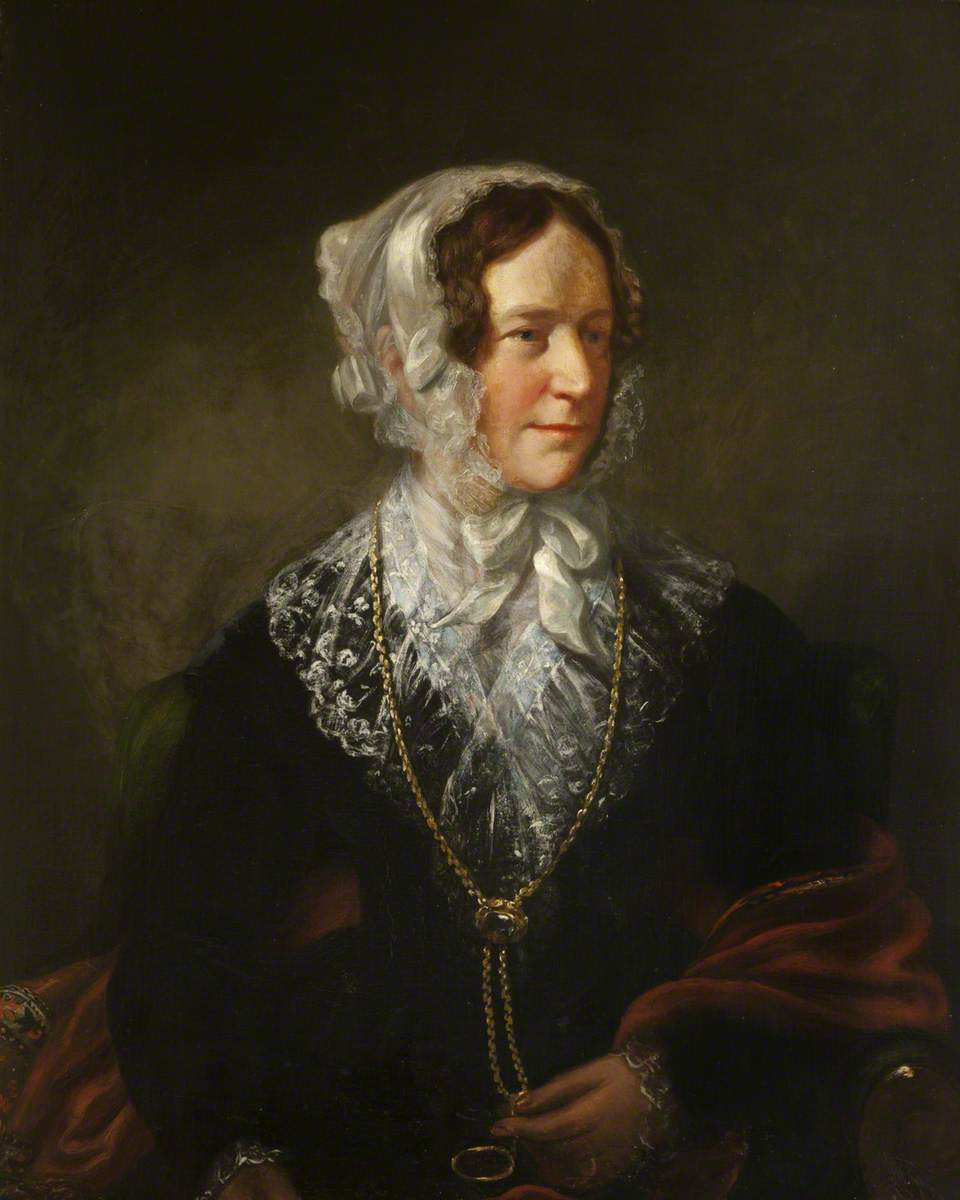
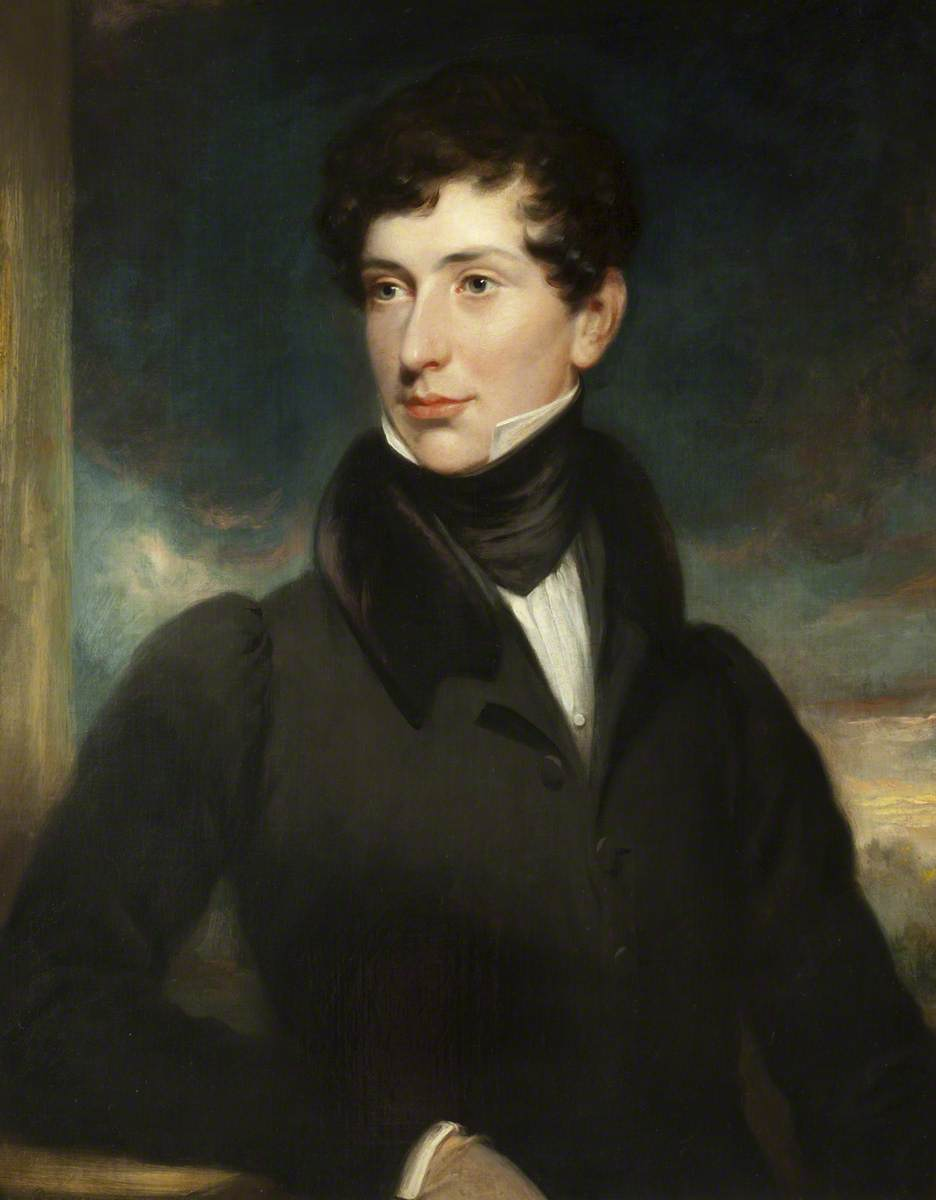
Armstrong's wife, Ann and their son, William, later 1st Baron Armstrong, aged 21. Both paintings owned by the National Trust and housed at Cragside, the home of Armstrong's son.

Around 1801, Armstrong married Ann Potter, the eldest daughter of William Potter of Walbottle House, and a "highly cultured woman" according to Henry Palin Gurney, writing for the Dictionary of National Biography. They had two children, a daughter and a son. The daughter, Ann, the eldest of the two, married William Henry Watson, a minor politician and judge. The son, William, later to become first Baron Armstrong, became a prominent industrialist, scientist, and inventor. The Armstrong household allowed William to nurture an early mechanical interest, often visiting the joiner employed by William Potter for lessons in mechanics. The family initially lived in a three-storey terraced house on 9 Pleasant Row, Shieldfield, where his son, William was born, and spent his early childhood, developing a passion for water and fishing. The house no longer exists, but the remaining lintel refers to the establishment as the 'Armstrong House', and a stone adjacent to Christ Church, Shieldfield, commemorates it. By the 1820s, with Armstrong's trade flourishing, the family moved to a larger, 12 acre establishment in Ouseburn Valley, where Armstrong built a house, known as South Jesmond House.

His financial success in the corn industry allowed Armstrong to pursue several personal interests, including a passion for mathematics. He contributed to the recreational mathematics journals, The Ladies' Diary and Gentleman's Diary, and collected a large mathematical library. Armstrong joined the recently founded Newcastle Literary and Philosophical Society in 1798, "a warm supporter of the institution and man of scholarly acquirements" according to a contemporary, and helped found the local Natural History Society. He also provided funds for the establishment of a local chamber of commerce, where he served on the committee. At the Literary and Philosophical Society, Armstrong became close friends with the local solicitor, Armorer Donkin. "Their tastes were similar; their political views harmonized; their aims were practically identical, and they became as brothers" according to local historian, Alfred Cochrane. Donkin remained a family friend and, later in his life, took the younger William as an apprentice.

Armstrong died on 2 June 1857, having given up many of his offices weeks earlier. Armstrong requested that his son, William, leave his large library of mathematical and local tracts to the Literary and Philosophical Society, a wish William fulfilled the following year, with 1284 works added to the society's libraries. This allowed the society "a more complete mathematical department than any other provincial institution in the kingdom" according to Dr. Robert Spence Watson, secretary of the society, 1862–93. Armstrong was buried in the local Jesmond Old Cemetery, in the same grave as his wife, who had predeceased him on 8 June 1848, and next to the grave of Armorer Donkin, who had died in 1851. Armstrong and Donkin's graves are, aside from their inscriptions, identical, with the twin low, cruciform, granite structures likely designed by the younger Armstrong.

== Sources ==
- "William Armstrong (1778-1857)". Friends of Jesmond Old Cemetery.
- Heald, Henrietta (2011). William Armstrong: Magician of the North. McNidder and Grace Limited. ISBN 978-0-85716-035-5.
- Guthrie, James (1880). The River Tyne: Its History and Resources (PDF). London: Longmans & Co. OCLC 1127098438.
- Gurney, Henry Palin (1901). "Armstrong, William George" . In Lee, Sidney (ed.). Dictionary of National Biography (1st supplement). London: Smith, Elder & Co.
- Linsley, Stafford M. (2006). "Armstrong, William (1778–1857), corn merchant and local politician". Oxford Dictionary of National Biography (online ed.). Oxford University Press. doi:10.1093/ref:odnb/668. (Subscription, Wikipedia Library access or UK public library membership required.)
- "Mayors and Sheriffs 1216 to date" (PDF). Newcastle City Council.
- Welford, Richard (1895). "William Armstrong, father of Lord Armstrong". Men of Mark 'twixt Tyne and Tweed. Vol. 1. London: Walter Scott, Ltd. pp. 106–108. OCLC 54294917.

Political offices
Preceded by Joseph Crawhall	Mayor of Newcastle-upon-Tyne; 1850-1851	Succeeded by James Hodgson
