= William Watson-Armstrong, 2nd Baron Armstrong =

British and Canadian peer (1892–1972)

Lord Armstrong in June 1953, wearing his coronation robe.

William John Montagu Watson-Armstrong, 2nd Baron Armstrong (10 October 1892 – 6 July 1972) was a British and Canadian aristocrat and soldier.

== Early life ==
Armstrong was born in 1892 as the first child of the businessman William Watson-Armstrong and Winifreda Jane (née Adye). When Armstrong was 11 in 1903, his father was created Baron Armstrong after inheriting his industrialist great-uncle's wealth but not title in 1900, at which point he became The Hon William Watson-Armstrong. Armstrong was educated at Eton and then Trinity College, where he received a first class degree in history in 1914.

== Military service ==
Commissioned into the 7th Battalion of the Northumberland Fusiliers in the Territorial Force in 1913, Armstrong served during World War I as a captain in France and Belgium, being mentioned in despatches and severely wounded in the Second Battle of Ypres in 1915, and invalided home in November 1917. Thereafter he served in India for a year from 1918 to 1919.

== Personal life ==
Armstrong married Zaida Cecile Drummond-Wolff in 1917 in Billere during the Great War. Their only child, William Henry Cecil John Robin Watson-Armstrong, was born in 1919.

== Diplomatic service ==
In 1924, Armstrong moved to Canada, where he was appointed Consul for Siam, and after five years promoted in 1929 to Consul-General, where he stayed in post until 1942, through the Siamese revolution of 1932 to do so on behalf of Thailand. For his service, he was appointed Commander of the Order of the Crown of Siam and Commander of the Order of the White Elephant.

In 1941, Armstrong's father died, and he succeeded as 2nd Lord Armstrong. He remained in Canada.

In 1942, Armstrong became Consul of the Netherlands for British Columbia and Yukon, serving until 1946, for which he was appointed Commander of the Order of Orange-Nassau.

== Retirement and death ==
Following World War II, Armstrong returned to the UK in 1946, splitting his time between Cragside and Bamburgh Castle.

Armstrong died in 1972, and was succeeded by his son.

== Arms ==
Coat of arms of William Watson-Armstrong, 2nd Baron Armstrong

Crest
1st a dexter arm embowed in armour couped at the shoulder and encircled at the elbow by a wreat of oak the hand grasping all Proper (Armstrong) 2nd in front of an arm embowed in armour Proper garnished Or holding a palm branch Vert a martlet between two crosses bottony Gules (Watson).
Escutcheon
Quarterly 1st & 4th Gules in fess a tilting spear Or headed Argent between two dexter arms embowed in armour couped at the shoulder fesswise Proper the hand extended also Proper (Armstrong) 2nd & 3rd Argent a fess raguly Gules between two crosses bottony in chief and a martlet in base Gules (Watson).
Supporters
On either side a figure habited as a smith holding with the exterior hand a hammer resting on the shoulder all Proper.
Motto
Fortis In Armis (Strong In Arms)

Peerage of the United Kingdom
Preceded by William Henry Armstrong Fitzpatrick Watson-Armstrong	Baron Armstrong; 1941–1972	Succeeded by William Henry Cecil John Robin Watson-Armstrong
