= William Watson-Armstrong, 1st Baron Armstrong =

British benefactor

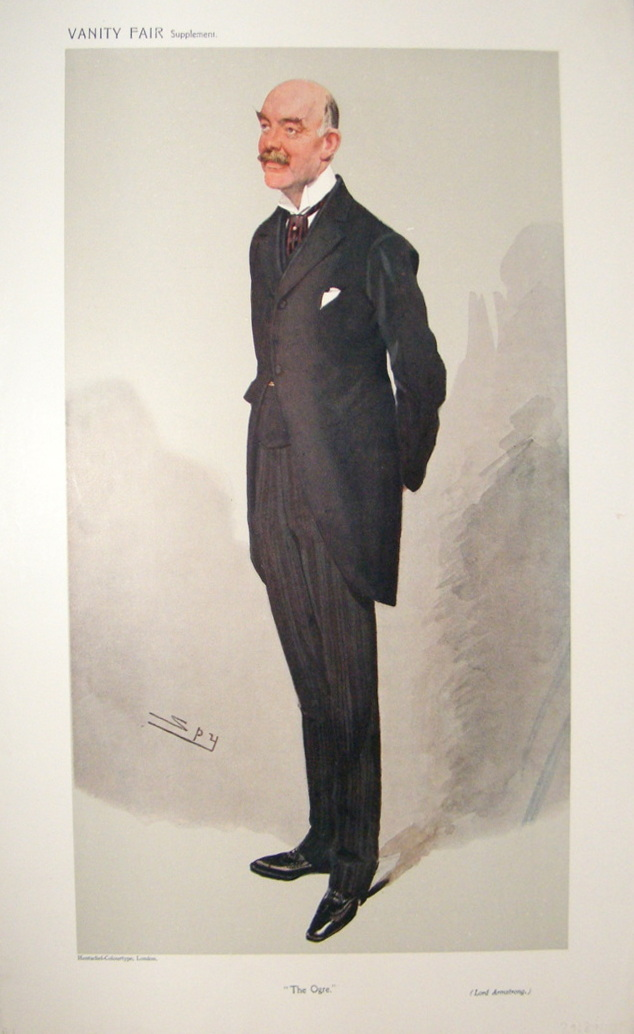
"The Ogre", caricature by Spy in Vanity Fair, 1908.

William Henry Armstrong Fitzpatrick Watson-Armstrong, 1st Baron Armstrong, DL, (3 May 1863 – 16 October 1941), was a British benefactor.

Born William Watson, he was born at 65 Eccleston Square, London, and educated at Eton and Trinity College, Cambridge. His parents were John William Watson, of Adderstone Hall, Belford, Northumberland and Margaret Godman Fitzpatrick, daughter of Patrick Persse Fitzpatrick, of Bognor Regis, Sussex. His father's parents were Sir William Henry Watson, Baron of the Exchequer, and Anne Armstrong, daughter of William Armstrong, a corn merchant and Mayor of Newcastle upon Tyne, whose son William Armstrong, 1st Baron Armstrong was the founder of the Armstrong Whitworth manufacturing empire. In 1889 William Watson assumed by royal licence the additional surname of Armstrong.

Watson-Armstrong served in the Northumberland Hussars, where he was promoted Major on 12 April 1902. He was High Sheriff of Northumberland in 1899, and was appointed a Deputy Lieutenant of Northumberland in 1901.

In 1900 he succeeded to the vast fortune of his great-uncle, Lord Armstrong. The following year he gave £100,000 (equivalent to £13,712,955 in 2023), for the building of the new Royal Victoria Infirmary in Newcastle upon Tyne, for which the city conferred upon him the honorary Freedom in July 1901. The original 1753 infirmary buildings at Forth Banks near the river Tyne were inadequate and impossible to expand.

In September 1901 he was awarded the honorary degree of Doctor of Civil Law (DCL) from the University of Durham.

In 1903 he was raised to the peerage as Baron Armstrong, of Bamburgh and Cragside in the County of Northumberland, a revival of the barony which had become extinct on his great-uncle's death three years earlier.

Lord Armstrong was married three times. He married firstly Winifreda Jane Adye, daughter of General Sir John Miller Adye, in 1889. They had one son and one daughter. After her death in December 1914 he married secondly Beatrice Elizabeth Cowx, daughter of Jonathan Cowx, in 1916. After her death in November 1934 he married thirdly Kathleen England (b. 12 August 1898), daughter of Reverend Charles Thorpe England, in 1935. The last two marriages were childless. Lord Armstrong died in October 1941, aged 78, and was succeeded in the barony by his only son, William. Lady Armstrong died on 2 September 1970.

== Arms ==
Coat of arms of William Watson-Armstrong, 1st Baron Armstrong

Crest
1st a dexter arm embowed in armour couped at the shoulder and encircled at the elbow by a wreat of oak the hand grasping all Proper (Armstrong) 2nd in front of an arm embowed in armour Proper garnished Or holding a palm branch Vert a martlet between two crosses bottony Gules (Watson).
Escutcheon
Quarterly 1st & 4th Gules in fess a tilting spear Or headed Argent between two dexter arms embowed in armour couped at the shoulder fesswise Proper the hand extended also Proper (Armstrong) 2nd & 3rd Argent a fess raguly Gules between two crosses bottony in chief and a martlet in base Gules (Watson).
Supporters
On either side a figure habited as a smith holding with the exterior hand a hammer resting on the shoulder all Proper.
Motto
Fortis In Armis (Strong In Arms)

Peerage of the United Kingdom
New creation	Baron Armstrong; 1903–1941	Succeeded by William John Montagu Watson-Armstrong
