= Literary and Philosophical Society of Newcastle upon Tyne =

Library in Newcastle upon Tyne, England

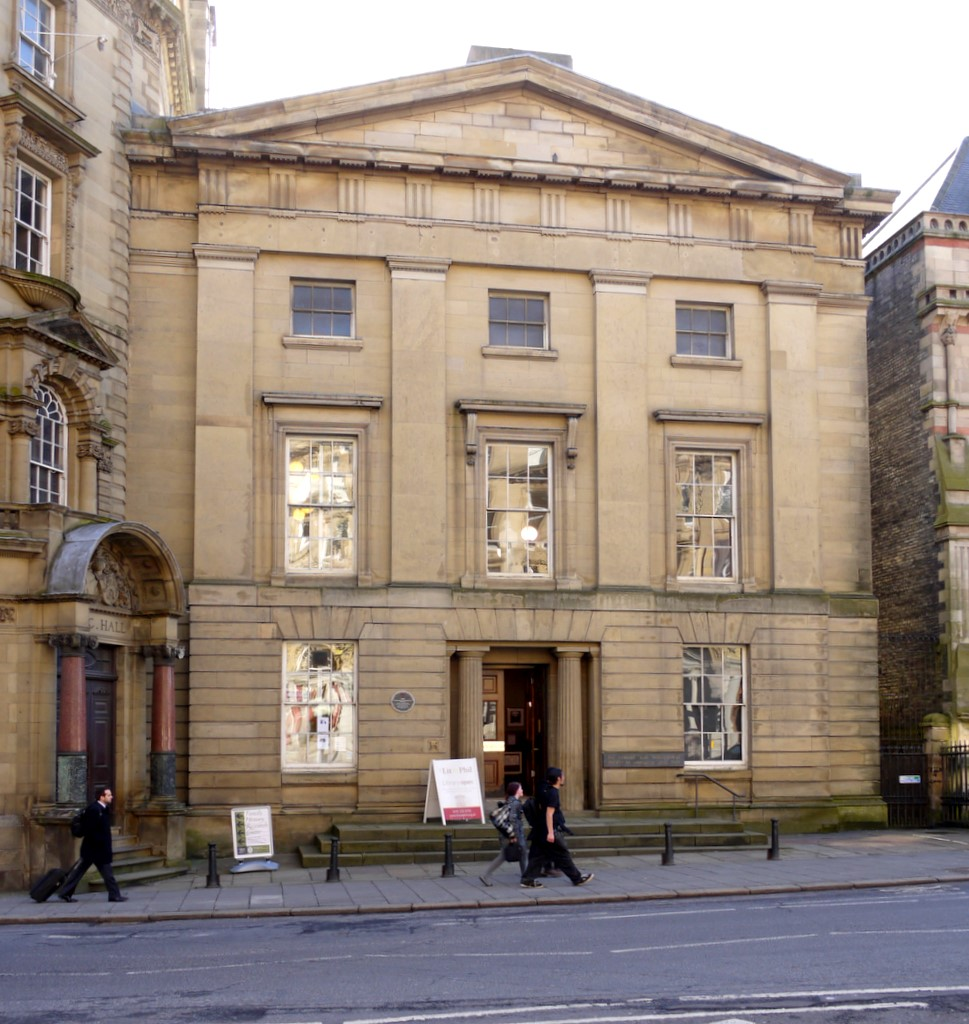
- Location in Tyne and Wear
- 54.969°N 1.614°W grid reference NZ248638
- Location: Tyne and Wear, England
- Established: 1793

The Literary and Philosophical Society of Newcastle upon Tyne (or the Lit & Phil as it is popularly known) is a historical library in Newcastle upon Tyne, England. It is the largest independent library outside London. The library is still available for both lending (to members) and as a free reference library. The society is a registered charity.

== Founding ==
Founded in 1793 as a "conversation club" by the Reverend William Turner and others – more than fifty years before the London Library – the annual subscription was originally one guinea. The Lit & Phil library contained works in French, Spanish, German and Latin; its contacts were international, and its members debated a wide range of issues, but religion and politics were prohibited. Women were first admitted to the library in 1804.

In February 2011, actor and comedian Alexander Armstrong became President of the Lit & Phil. He launched their funding appeal at a special gala event. At the start of 2012, membership of the Library reached 2,000, the highest number since 1952.

== History ==
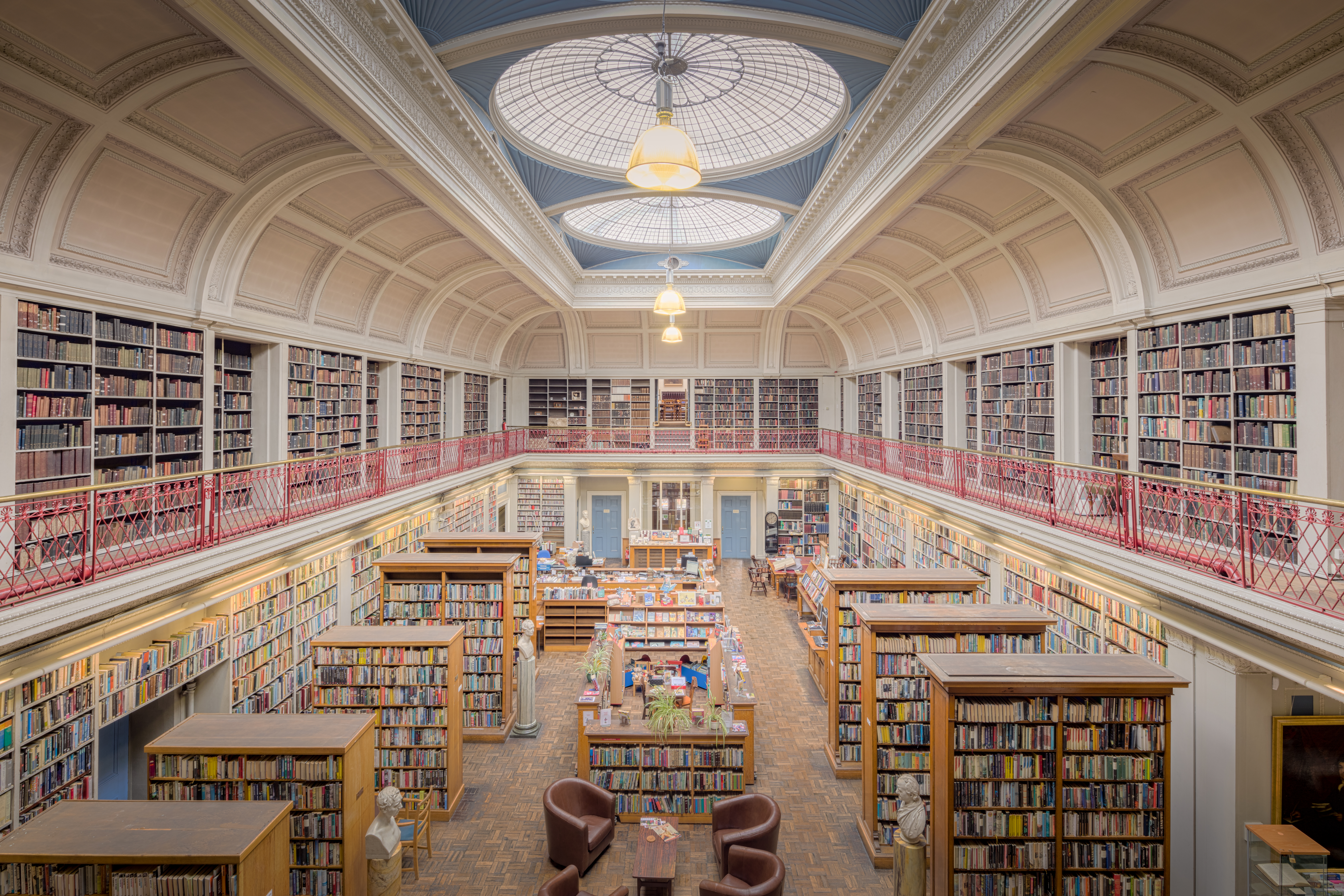
Library interior

During the 19th and 20th centuries, the Lit & Phil was host to a long list of the intelligentsia of the era. Engineer and inventor George Stephenson showed his miner's lamp there, and in 1879, when Joseph Swan demonstrated his electric light bulbs, the Lit & Phil building became the first public building to be so illuminated.

The Society received in 1800 the country's first specimens of the wombat and the duck-billed platypus from John Hunter, Governor of New South Wales and honorary member of the Lit & Phil.

Between 1822 and 1825, a new building was created for the Society on Westgate Road, designed by John Green. The building is still in use today, with many original features including iron-work second-floor galleries.

=== Presidents ===
- 1793–1798: John Widderington
- 1798–1838: Sir John Swinburne, 6th Baronet
- 1838–1851: Charles William Bigge
- 1851–1855: Thomas Emerson Headlam
- 1855–1859: Robert Stephenson
- 1860–1900: William, Lord Armstrong of Cragside
- 1901–1911: Robert Spence Watson
- 1911–1914: Joseph Swan
- 1914–1916: Richard Oliver Heslop
- 1916–1931: Charles Algernon Parsons
- 1931–1940: G. M. Trevelyan
- 1940–1961: C. H. Hunter Blair
- 1961–1966: A. D. S. Rogers
- 1967–1968: P. L. Robinson
- 1969–1979: J. Philipson
- 1979–1987: S. T. L. Harbottle
- 1987–1998: D. T. Turnbull
- 1998–2005 P. J. Turnbull
- 2005–2008: B. R. Bennison
- 2008–2009: W. L. Bower
- 2009–2011: Mrs J. R. Sharp
- 2012–present: Alexander Armstrong

=== Notable members ===
Amongst the historic and contemporary members are the following:

- David Almond (born 1951)
- William Armstrong (1778–1857)
- John James Audubon (1785–1851)
- Thomas Bewick (1753–1828)
- Sid Chaplin (1916–1986)
- John Dobson (1787–1865)
- Ruth Dodds (1890–1976)
- Richard Grainger (1797–1861)
- Charles, 2nd Earl Grey (1764–1845)
- J. Thomas Looney (1870–1944)
- James Losh (1763–1833)
- Harriet Martineau (1802–1876)
- Robert Stephenson (1803–1859)
- Joseph Wilson Swan (1828–1914)
- Neil Tennant (born 1954)
- Elizabeth and Robert Spence Watson (1837–1911)
- Thomas Masterman Winterbottom (1766–1859)

== Sources ==
- Association of Independent Libraries
- The National Archives
