= Jesmond Dene House =

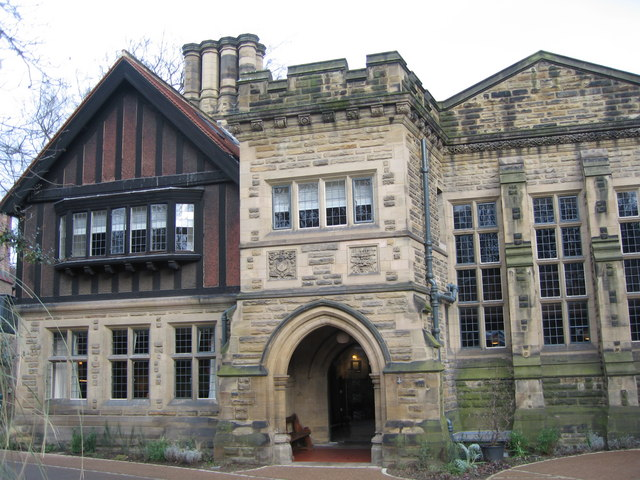
- Jesmond Dene House

- Location in Tyne and Wear

General information
- Location: Tyne and Wear, England, UK
- Coordinates: 54.999°N 1.604°W
- OS grid: NZ254672

Listed Building – Grade II
- Official name: Jesmond Dene House
- Designated: 8 May 1981
- Reference no.: 1024853

Jesmond Dene House is a 19th-century mansion house at Jesmond Dene, Newcastle upon Tyne, England which is now a hotel. It is a Grade II listed building.

== History ==
The house, which was designed by John Dobson for Thomas Emerson Headlam, a physician and Mayor of Newcastle, was completed in 1822. (Note: This was not the home of Lord Armstrong, a wealthy industrialist, whose nearby house has been demolished, though its Banqueting Hall survives. However Armstrong did landscape and develop the adjacent Jesmond Dene into a woodland park and garden.)

In 1851, Dobson made substantial changes to the house for its new owner, William Cruddas. In 1871 the house was bought by Lord Armstrong's business partner Andrew Noble. At this time Noble had architect Norman Shaw make significant alterations to the house. In 1897, Noble carried out further extensive alterations and extensions to the house, with the assistance of architect Frank West Rich, including a new west wing, a great hall and a Gothic-style porch.

Following the death of Noble's widow in 1929 the house was put to various uses, including a college, a civil defence establishment, a seminary and a residential school. Following an extensive restoration and refurbishment in 2005, Jesmond Dene House became a 40-bedroom boutique hotel with a three-rosette restaurant.
