= Sir Andrew Noble, 1st Baronet =

Scottish physicist (1831–1915)

Sir Andrew Noble Bt KCB FRS
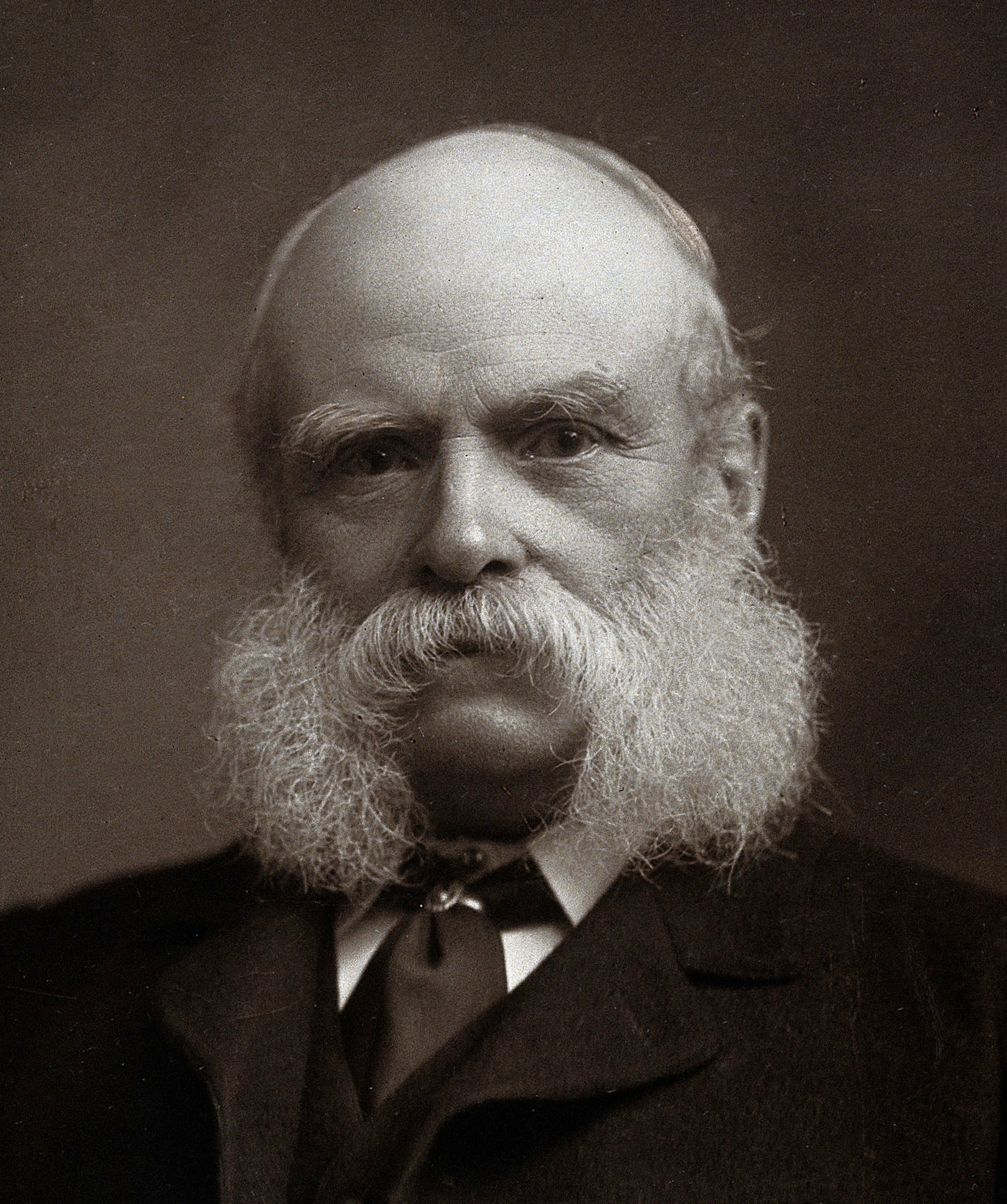
- Sir Andrew Noble c. 1907
- Born: 13 September 1831; Greenock, Scotland
- Died: 22 October 1915 (aged 84); Argyll, Scotland
- Known for: Ballistics
- Spouse: Margery Durham Campbell (m. 1854)
- Children: 2 daughters, 4 sons
- Awards: Royal Medal (1880); Albert Medal (1909)
- Scientific career
- Fields: Physics

Sir Andrew Noble, 1st Baronet KCB FRS (13 September 1831 – 22 October 1915) was a Scottish physicist noted for his work on ballistics and gunnery.

== Early life ==
Born at Greenock, he was educated at Edinburgh Academy and at the Royal Military Academy, Woolwich. He was commissioned in the Royal Artillery in 1849, promoted captain in 1855 and became secretary of the Royal Artillery Institution. He was secretary of the British government select committee on the replacement of smooth-bore cannon with rifled artillery and carried out research on the subject. In 1859 he became Assistant-Inspector of Artillery and in 1860 a member of the Ordnance Select Committee and of the Committee on Explosives, remaining on the committee until it was dissolved in 1880.

== Notable work ==
In 1860 he joined Armstrong's armaments works in Elswick, Newcastle-upon-Tyne, first as joint manager and, from 1861, as a partner, where he continued research into artillery, in particular inventing ways of measuring breech pressures. In 1862 he invented the Electro-Mechanical Chronoscope to measure small time intervals between triggers inserted into a gun to determine the acceleration of projectiles as they travelled down the barrel, allowing him to assess the performance of different powders. He was initially accommodated at one of Armstrong's properties, Deep Dene House.

He worked with Sir Frederick Abel on improving the properties of black powder, making it burn more slowly to produce more gas and a more consistent pressure, with the result that he was able to increase muzzle velocities from 1600 to 2100 feet per second, while the energy developed increased by about 75%. Noble's work also assisted Abel's further development of a new smokeless powder, cordite, in 1889. These developments required the re-design of both the guns and their mountings, manufactured by Armstrongs, which gave them a competitive advantage, ultimately helping the company expand into shipbuilding, locomotives, tanks and aircraft to become one of the world's largest armament firms by 1914. With Sir William Armstrong's effective retirement from active control in about 1890, Noble's primary role changed from scientist to businessman, formally becoming chairman in 1900, and he oversaw much of this growth of the company. Noble claimed that all the Japanese guns which sank the Russian fleet at the crucial battle of Tsushima in 1905, had been manufactured at Elswick.

In 1870, at the age of 38 he was recognised for his scientific work and was elected a Fellow of the Royal Society. He was awarded the Society's gold medal in 1880. He was made a Companion of the order of the Bath in 1881 and knighted in 1893. He served as High Sheriff of Northumberland in 1896. It was announced that he would receive a baronetcy in the 1902 Coronation Honours list published on 26 June 1902 for the (subsequently postponed) coronation of King Edward VII, and on 24 July 1902 he was created a Baronet, of Ardmore and Ardardan Noble, in the parish of Cardross, in the county of Dumbarton.

== Personal life ==
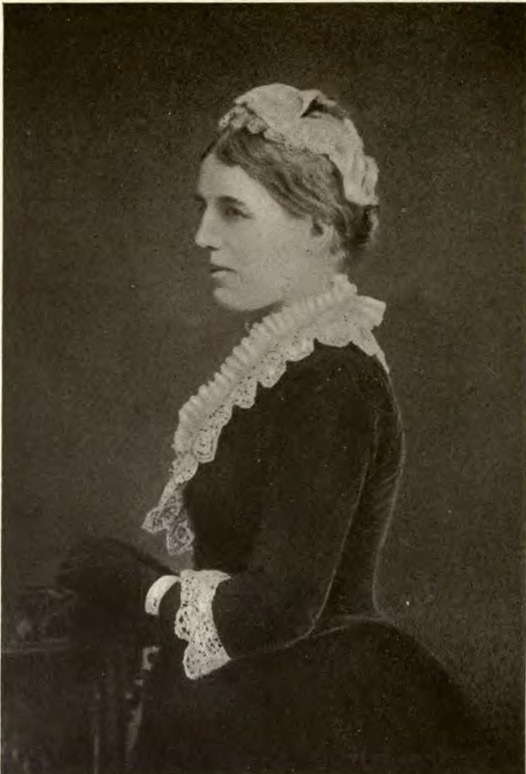
Margery Durham Campbell Noble

In 1854, while stationed with his regiment in Quebec, Noble married Margery Durham Campbell. They had four sons and two daughters. Margery lived to the age of 101.

Noble's first and second sons George and Saxton became successively second and third baronets, while his third son John Noble, also involved with Armstrongs, was created a baronet in his own right in 1923. The latter's youngest son Michael Noble became a prominent Conservative politician and was created a life peer as Baron Glenkinglas in 1974.

Noble's youngest daughter Ethel married Alfred Cochrane, a cricketer and poet, who was Company Secretary at Armstrongs. His granddaughter Cynthia Noble was a noted society hostess and diarist who married the diplomat Gladwyn Jebb.

== Architectural patronage ==
Noble and his sons used their wealth to commission a number of important houses from some of the foremost architects of the day.

In 1871, he bought Jesmond Dene House, which was originally designed by John Dobson, and commissioned Norman Shaw and later local architect Frank West Rich to double the size of the house adding a west wing, billiard room, Gothic porch, Great Hall and a range of bedrooms. In 1894 he also built a real tennis court in the grounds of the house, one of only around 50 currently in use worldwide. Jesmond Dene House is now an hotel and restaurant.

In 1905, Noble bought the Ardkinglas estate on Loch Fyne in Argyllshire, commissioning Sir Robert Lorimer to build a large new house, Lorimer's masterpiece, and later to restore Dunderave Castle on the other side of the loch.

In 1910 his eldest son George commissioned Randall Wells to rebuild Besford Court, Worcestershire in a Tudor gothic style, the architect's masterpiece and the last great gothic English country house.

In 1911 his second son Saxton commissioned Reginald Blomfield to build Wretham Hall, Norfolk in a William and Mary style. Following the near-collapse of Armstrongs in 1927 Wretham was demolished, and Saxton commissioned designs for a topiary garden representing the plan of a huge house for the site from Sir Edwin Lutyens.

In 1920 his youngest son Philip again commissioned Sir Robert Lorimer to alter Glendoe, Inverness-shire.

== Orders, decorations, and medals ==
- Grand Cross of the Imperial Order of the Rose
- Commander of the Order of the Crown of Italy
- Commander of the Portuguese Order of Christ
- Royal Medallist of the Royal Society (1880)
- Companion of the Order of the Bath (1881)
- Knight Commander of the Order of the Bath (1893)
- Knight of the Order of Charles III
- Baronet in the Baronetage of the United Kingdom (1902)

== See also ==
- Internal ballistics
- Noble baronets

Baronetage of the United Kingdom
New creation	Baronet (of Ardmore and Ardardran Noble); 1902–1915	Succeeded by George John William Noble
