= Baron Armstrong =

Extinct barony in the Peerage of the United Kingdom

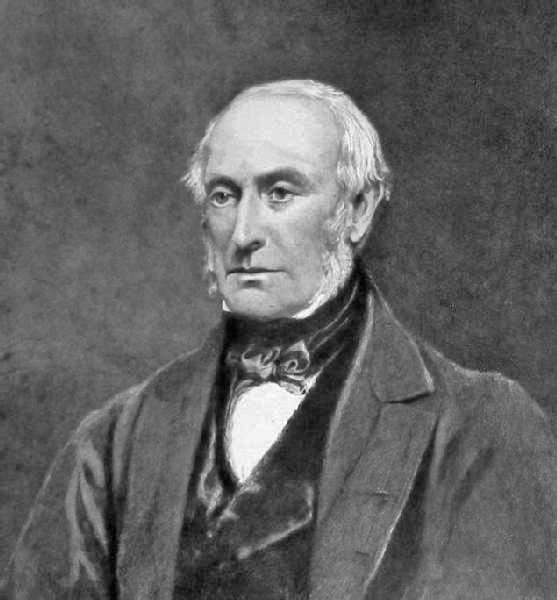
William Armstrong, 1st Baron Armstrong

Baron Armstrong is a title that has been created twice in the Peerage of the United Kingdom.

The first creation came on 6 July 1887 when the industrialist Sir William Armstrong was made Baron Armstrong, of Cragside in the County of Northumberland. The title became extinct on his death in 1900. The title was revived three years later, on 4 August 1903, for his great-nephew William Watson-Armstrong, who was created Baron Armstrong, of Bamburgh and of Cragside in the County of Northumberland. Born William Watson, he had assumed the additional surname of Armstrong by Royal licence in 1889.

Lord Armstrong was the grandson of Sir William Henry Watson, Baron of the Exchequer, by his wife Anne, sister of the first Baron of the first creation. He was succeeded by his son, the second Baron. He unsuccessfully contested Berwick-on-Tweed as an independent candidate in the 1918 general election. The title became extinct from the male line in 1987 on the death of his son, the third Baron.

== Barons Armstrong; First creation (1887) ==
- William George Armstrong, 1st Baron Armstrong (1810–1900)

== Barons Armstrong; Second creation (1903) ==
- William Henry Armstrong Fitzpatrick Watson-Armstrong, 1st Baron Armstrong (1863–1941)
- William John Montagu Watson-Armstrong, 2nd Baron Armstrong (1892–1972)
- William Henry Cecil John Robin Watson-Armstrong, 3rd Baron Armstrong (1919–1987). He married Baroness Maria-Theresa Chiodelli-Manzoni in 1947 and adopted two children: a son, Francis, and a daughter, Isabella. Francis Watson-Armstrong has three children, William, Rosie and Juliet, and owns the Bamburgh Castle estate.

== Arms ==
Coat of arms of Baron Armstrong

Crest
1st a dexter arm embowed in armour couped at the shoulder and encircled at the elbow by a wreat of oak the hand grasping all Proper (Armstrong) 2nd in front of an arm embowed in armour Proper garnished Or holding a palm branch Vert a martlet between two crosses bottony Gules (Watson).
Escutcheon
Quarterly 1st & 4th Gules in fess a tilting spear Or headed Argent between two dexter arms embowed in armour couped at the shoulder fesswise Proper the hand extended also Proper (Armstrong) 2nd & 3rd Argent a fess raguly Gules between two crosses bottony in chief and a martlet in base Gules (Watson).
Supporters
On either side a figure habited as a smith holding with the exterior hand a hammer resting on the shoulder all Proper.
Motto
Fortis In Armis (Strong In Arms)
