= Jesmond Dene Banqueting Hall =

Former entertainment facility in Newcastle upon Tyne, England

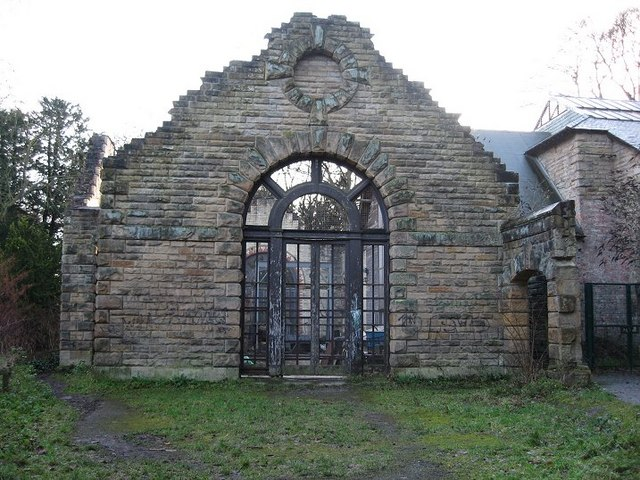
- The original banqueting hall in 2007

- Shown in Tyne and Wear
- 54.9928°N 1.5943°W
- Location: Jesmond Dene Road, Jesmond Dene

History
- Built: 1862

Site notes
- Architect: John Dobson (banqueting hall) Norman Shaw (gatehouse)
- Architectural styles: Italianate style (banqueting hall) and Gothic Revival style (gatehouse)

Listed Building – Grade II
- Official name: Banqueting House with added gatehouse and other extensions
- Designated: 12 November 1965
- Reference no.: 1024855

Jesmond Dene Banqueting Hall is a former entertainment facility for important guests in Jesmond Dene Road, Jesmond Dene, Newcastle upon Tyne. The building, which is currently derelict, is a Grade II listed building.

== History ==
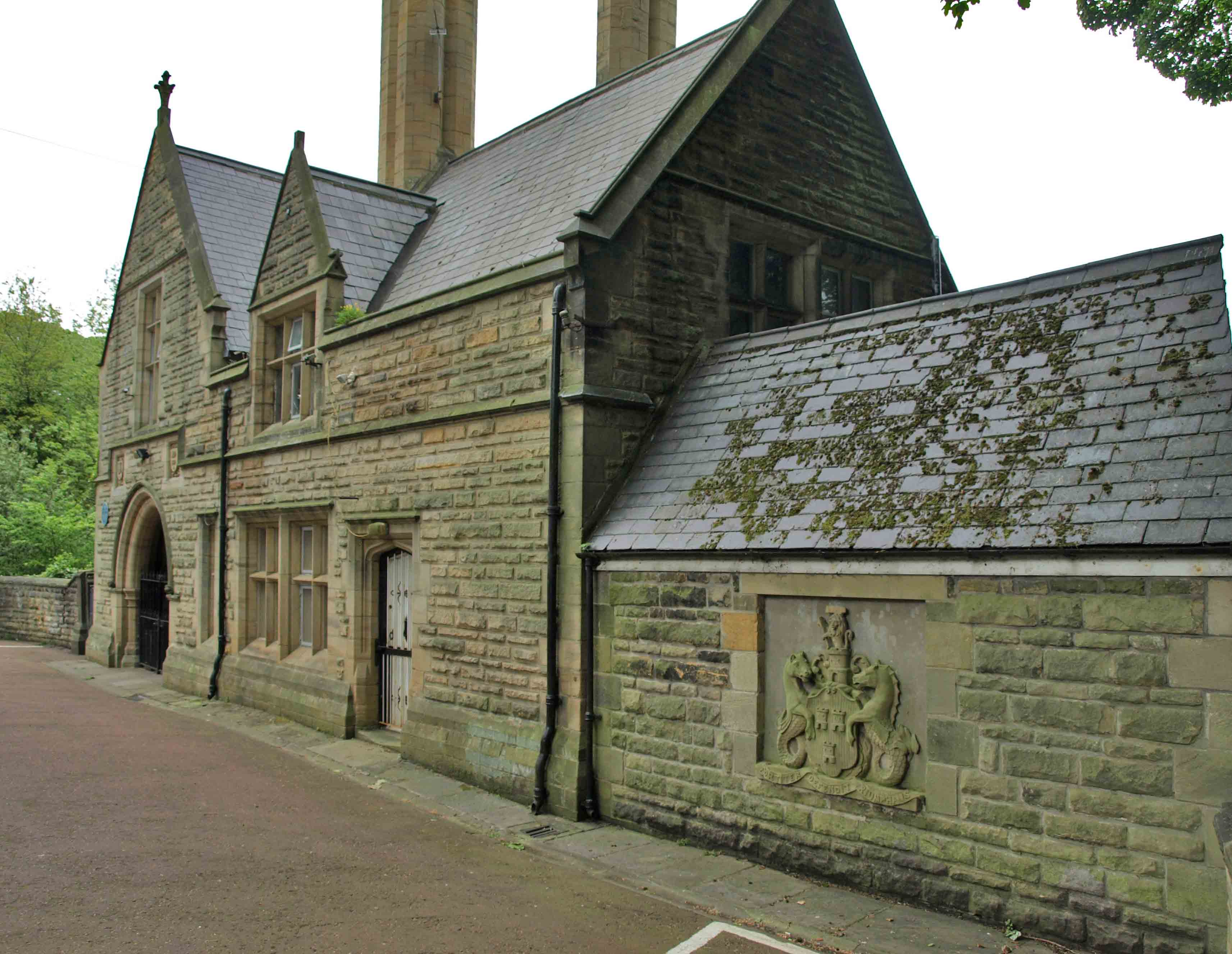
The gatehouse, visible from Jesmond Dene Road

The building was commissioned by William Armstrong, 1st Baron Armstrong as an entertainment facility for important guests to complement the large mansion (since demolished) that he had built to the west of Jesmond Dene in 1835. Armstrong had tunnels built to connect his house with the banqueting hall. The banqueting hall was designed by John Dobson in the Italianate style, built in rubble masonry and was completed in 1862. The design, which was orientated from north to south, was a rectangular structure with tall round headed windows at both ends.

The complex was extended to a design by Norman Shaw with a gatehouse, reception hall and art gallery between 1869 and 1870. The gatehouse provided access to the other structures, which included the banqueting hall, all of which were reached down a steep staircase and were swept back down the hill. The design of the gatehouse, the only part of the structure visible from Jesmond Dene Road, involved an asymmetrical main frontage of three bays. The left-hand bay featured an arched opening with an archivolt and a hood mould with a tall mullioned and transomed window in the gable above. The central bay was fenestrated with a pair of square mullioned and transomed windows on the ground floor and a tripartite mullioned and transomed window on the first floor with a small gablet above. The right-hand bay contained a small arched doorway on the ground floor.

Armstrong donated the banqueting hall together with Jesmond Dene gardens to Newcastle Corporation in 1883, on the understanding that the complex would be used for the arts, literature, science or education. The Prince of Wales was one of the guests entertained, to celebrate the donation of the gardens, in 1884.

During the first half of the twentieth century, the banqueting hall was used by Newcastle Corporation for entertaining civic guests, and the works of art included a 20 feet (6.1 m) portrait of Prince Hal. However, by 1970, the complex was disused and in 1977 the roof was removed from the original hall.

In September 2017, Newcastle City Council sought expressions of interest on how the complex might be brought back into use. The Tyne and Wear Building Preservation Trust asked the Miller Partnership to prepare design proposals for development of the complex; drawings were duly submitted. However, the complex was listed by the Victorian Society as one of the top ten buildings at risk in May 2024.

A charity, Urban Green Newcastle, became responsible for the city's parks in 2019 but, after failing to restore the buildings including the Banqueting Hall, handed the parks back to the city in November 2025.
