= William Armstrong, 1st Baron Armstrong =

English inventor, scientist, engineer and industrialist (1810–1900)

The Right Honourable The Lord Armstrong CB FRS
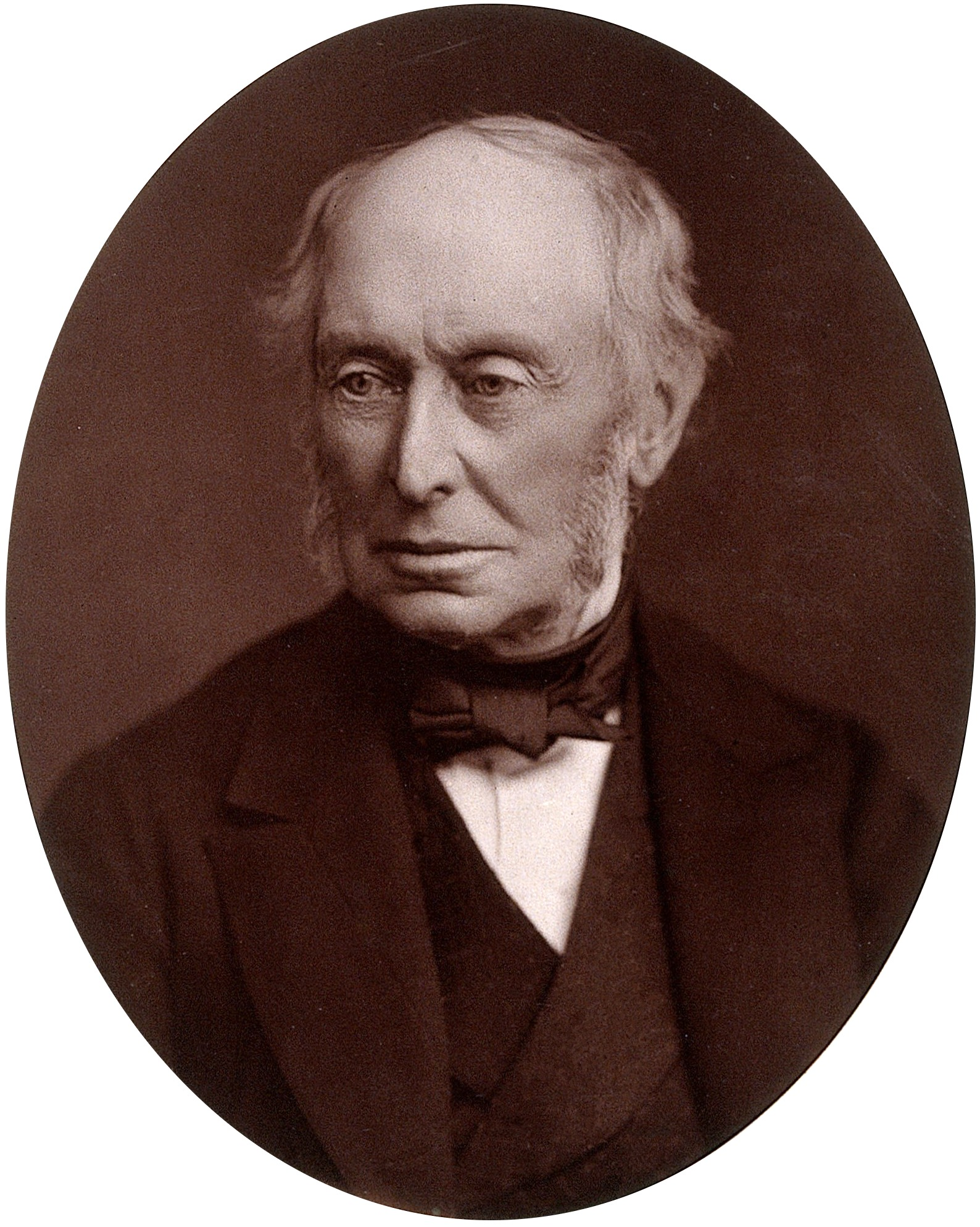
- Born: William George Armstrong; 26 November 1810; Newcastle upon Tyne, England
- Died: 27 December 1900 (aged 90); Rothbury, Northumberland, England
- Spouse: Margaret Ramshaw
- Parent(s): William Armstrong; Anne Potter
- Engineering career
- Discipline: Civil, Mechanical, Electrical, Structural
- Institutions: British Association for the Advancement of Science (President), Royal Society (Fellow), Institution of Civil Engineers (President), Institution of Mechanical Engineers (President), North of England Institute of Mining and Mechanical Engineers (President), Literary and Philosophical Society of Newcastle upon Tyne (President)
- Significant design: hydraulic crane, hydroelectric machine, accumulator, Armstrong Gun
- Awards: Telford Medal (1850), Albert Medal (1878), Bessemer Medal (1891)

Signature
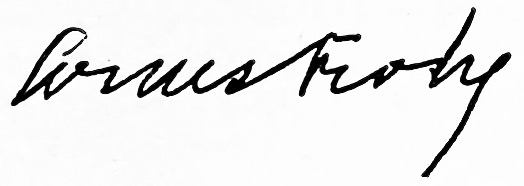

William George Armstrong, 1st Baron Armstrong (26 November 1810 – 27 December 1900) was an English engineer and industrialist who founded the Armstrong Whitworth manufacturing concern on Tyneside. He was also an eminent scientist, inventor and philanthropist. In collaboration with the architect Richard Norman Shaw, he built Cragside in Northumberland, the first house in the world to be lit by hydroelectricity. He is regarded as the inventor of modern artillery.

Armstrong was knighted in 1859 after giving his gun patents to the government. In 1887, during Queen Victoria's golden jubilee year, he was raised to the peerage as Baron Armstrong, of Cragside.

== Early life ==
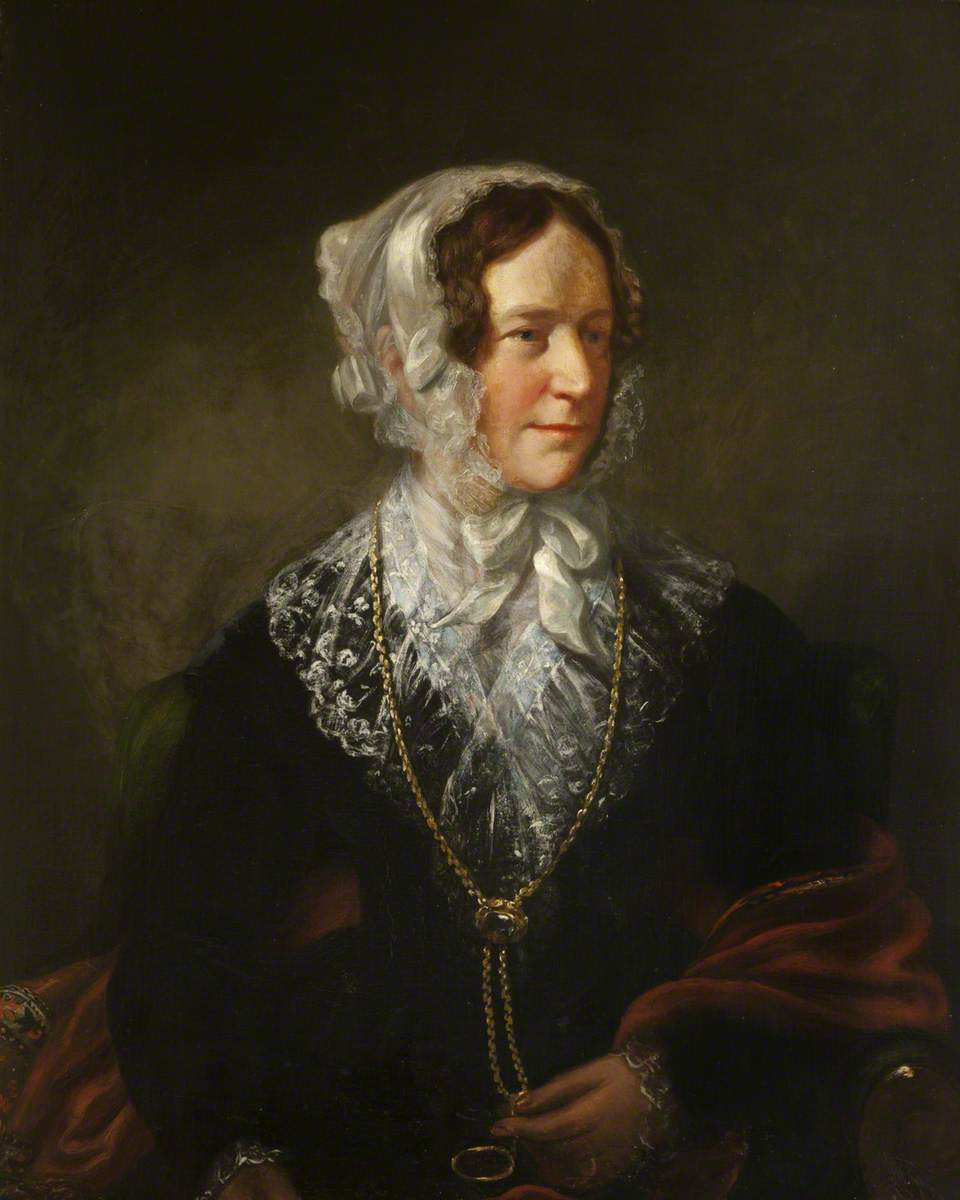
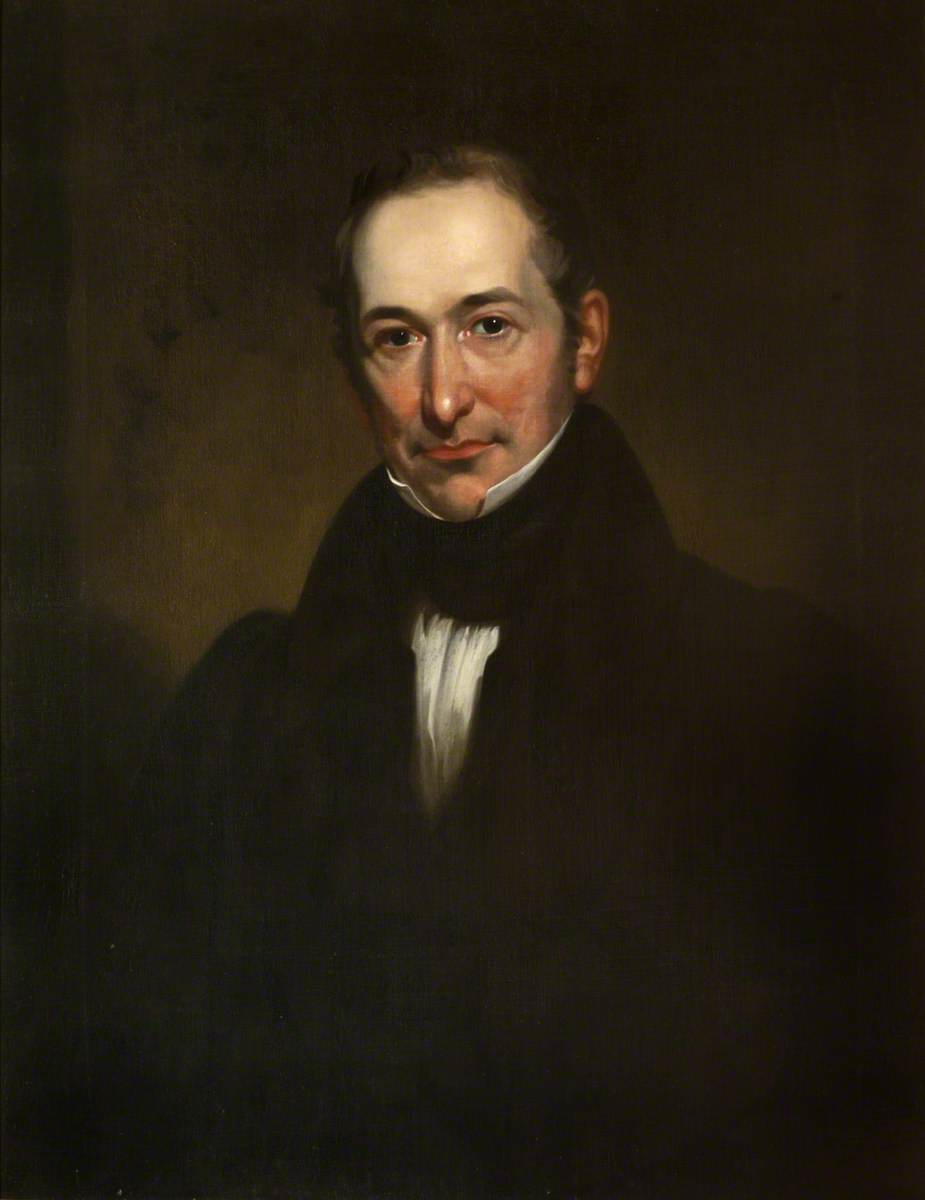
Armstrong's parents: William and Anne, in two oil paintings held by the National Trust at Cragside.

Armstrong was born in Newcastle upon Tyne at 9 Pleasant Row, Shieldfield. Although the house in which he was born no longer exists, an inscribed granite tablet marks the site where it stood. At that time, the area – next to the Pandon Dene – was rural. His father, also called William, was a corn merchant on the Newcastle quayside, who rose through the ranks of Newcastle society to become mayor of the town in 1850. An elder sister, Anne, born in 1802, was named after his mother, the daughter of Addison Potter.

Armstrong was educated at the Royal Grammar School, Newcastle upon Tyne, until he was sixteen, when he was sent to Bishop Auckland Grammar School. While there, he often visited the nearby engineering works of William Ramshaw. During his visits, he met his future wife, Ramshaw's daughter Margaret, six years his senior.

Armstrong's father was set on his following a career in the law, and so he was articled to Armorer Donkin, a solicitor friend of his father. He spent five years in London studying law and returned to Newcastle in 1833. He became a partner in Donkin's business in 1835, and the firm became Donkin, Stable and Armstrong. He married Margaret Ramshaw in 1835, and they built a house in Jesmond Dene, on the eastern edge of Newcastle. Armstrong worked for eleven years as a solicitor, but during his spare time, he showed great interest in engineering and developed the "Armstrong Hydroelectric Machine" between 1840 and 1842. In 1837, he laid the foundations for the engineering and environmental consultancy which is today known as Wardell Armstrong.

== Change of career ==
Armstrong was a very keen angler, and while fishing on the River Dee at Dentdale in the Pennines, he saw a waterwheel in action, supplying power to a marble quarry. It struck Armstrong that much of the available power was being wasted. When he returned to Newcastle, he designed a rotary engine powered by water, and this was built in the High Bridge works of his friend Henry Watson. Little interest was shown in the engine. Armstrong subsequently developed a piston engine instead of a rotary one and decided that it might be suitable for driving a hydraulic crane. In 1846 his work as an amateur scientist was recognized when he was elected a Fellow of the Royal Society.

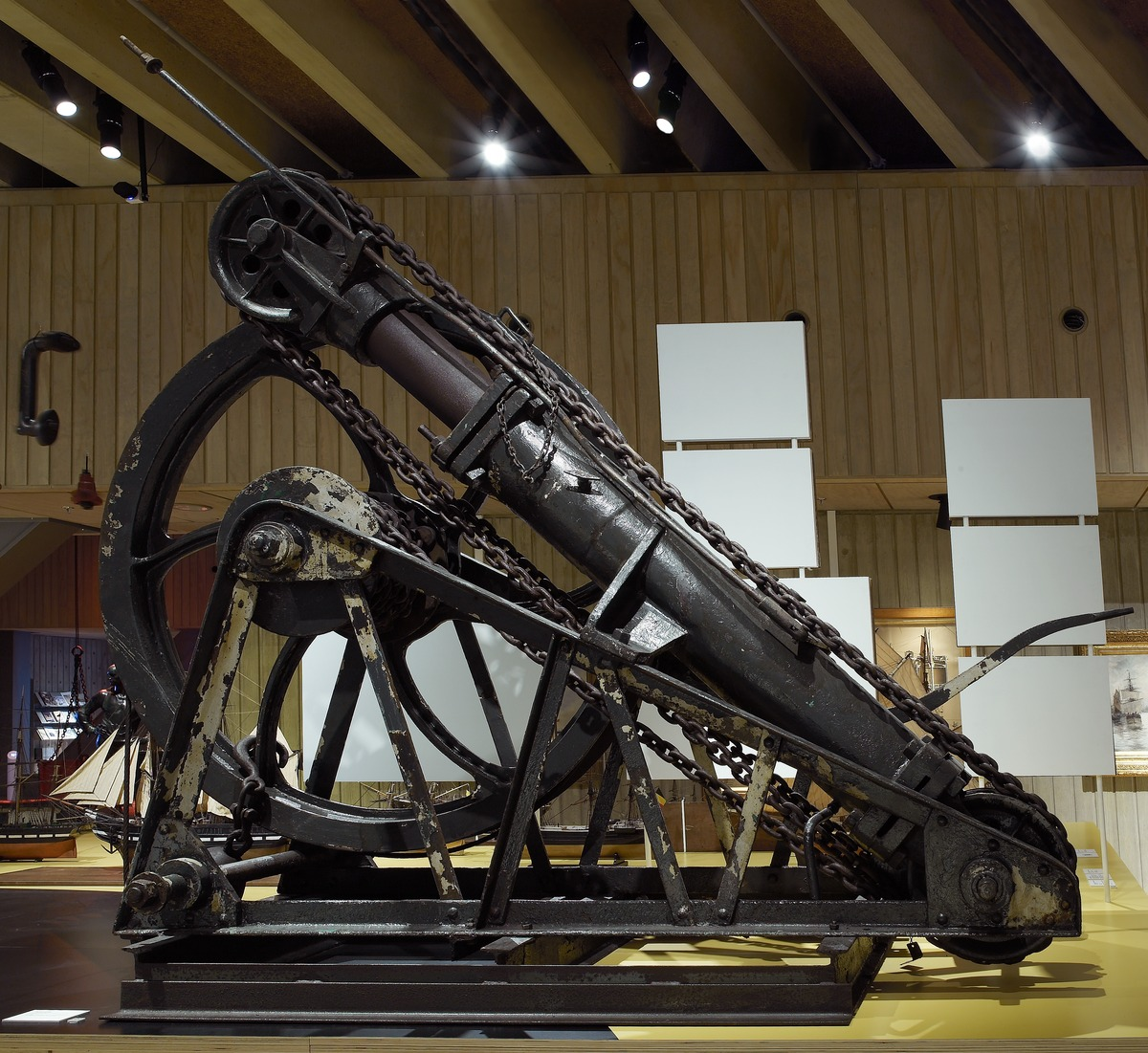
Armstrong hydraulic jigger winch of 1888

In 1845 a scheme was set in motion to provide piped water from distant reservoirs to the households of Newcastle. Armstrong was involved in this scheme and he proposed to Newcastle Corporation that the excess water pressure in the lower part of town could be used to power a quayside crane specially adapted by himself. He claimed that his hydraulic crane could unload ships faster and more cheaply than conventional cranes. The Corporation agreed to his suggestion, and the experiment proved so successful that three more hydraulic cranes were installed on the Quayside.

The success of his hydraulic crane led Armstrong to consider setting up a business to manufacture cranes and other hydraulic equipment. He therefore resigned from his legal practice. Donkin, his legal colleague, supported him in his career move, providing financial backing for the new venture. In 1847 the firm of W. G. Armstrong & Company bought 5.5 acres (22,000 m^{2}) of land alongside the river at Elswick, near Newcastle, and began to build a factory there. The new company received orders for hydraulic cranes from Edinburgh and Northern Railways and from Liverpool Docks, as well as for hydraulic machinery for dock gates in Grimsby. The company soon began to expand. In 1850 the company produced 45 cranes and two years later, 75. It averaged 100 cranes per year for the rest of the century. In 1850 over 300 men were employed at the works, but by 1863 this had risen to 3,800. The company soon branched out into bridge building, one of the first orders being for the Inverness Bridge, completed in 1855.

== Hydraulic accumulator ==
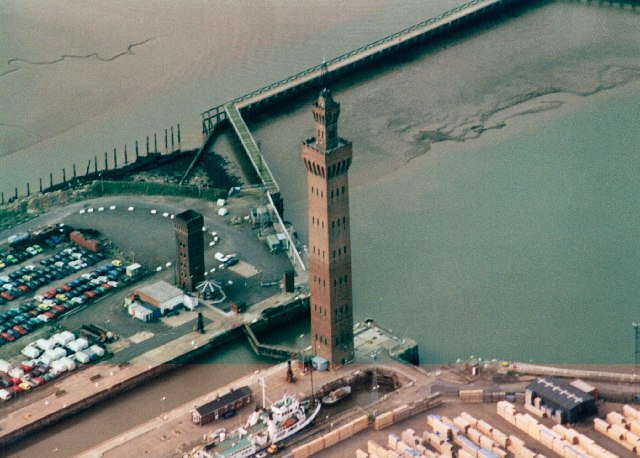
Grimsby Dock Tower

Armstrong was responsible for developing the hydraulic accumulator. Where water pressure was not available on site for the use of hydraulic cranes, Armstrong often built high water towers to provide a supply of water at pressure – for instance, the Grimsby Dock Tower. However, when supplying cranes for use at New Holland on the Humber Estuary, he was unable to do this because the foundations consisted of sand. After much careful thought he produced the weighted accumulator, a cast-iron cylinder fitted with a plunger supporting a very heavy weight. The plunger would slowly be raised, drawing in water, until the downward force of the weight was sufficient to force the water below it into pipes at great pressure. The accumulator was a very significant, if unspectacular, invention, which found many applications in the following years.

== Armaments ==
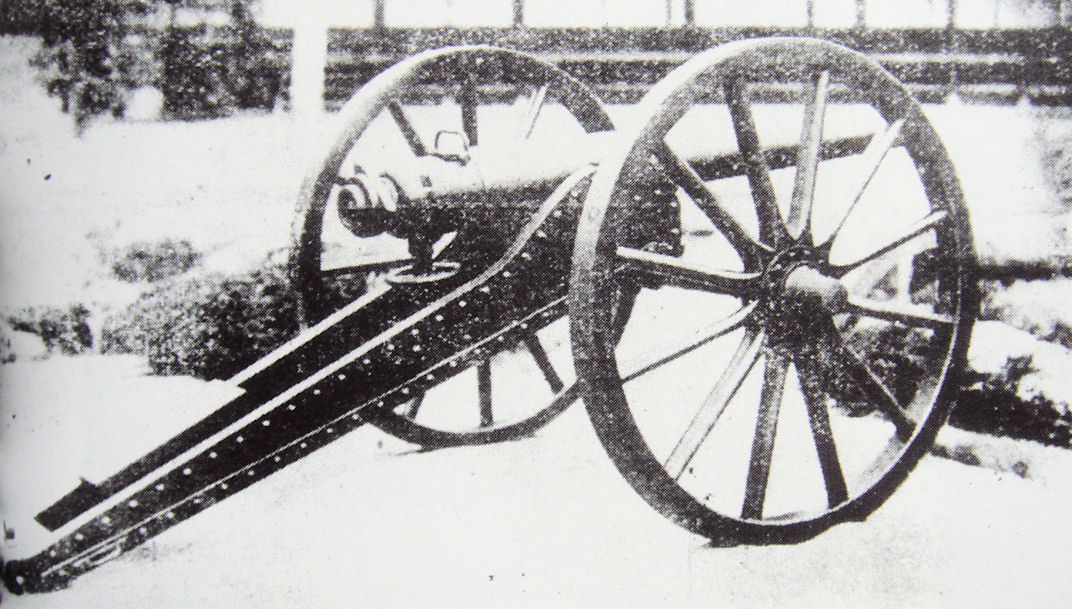
Armstrong gun deployed by Japan during the Boshin war (1868–69).

In 1854, during the Crimean War, Armstrong read about the difficulties the British Army experienced in manoeuvring its heavy field guns. He decided to design a lighter, more mobile field gun, with greater range and accuracy. He built a breech-loading gun with a strong, rifled barrel made from wrought iron wrapped around a steel inner lining, designed to fire a shell rather than a ball. In 1855, he had a five-pounder ready for inspection by a government committee. The gun proved successful in trials, but the committee thought a higher calibre gun was needed, so Armstrong built an 18-pounder on the same design.

After trials, this gun was declared to be superior to all its rivals. Armstrong surrendered the patent for the gun to the British government, rather than profit from its design. As a result he was created a Knight Bachelor and in 1859 was presented to Queen Victoria. Armstrong became employed as Engineer of Rifled Ordnance to the War Department. In order to avoid a conflict of interests if his own company were to manufacture armaments, Armstrong created a separate company, called Elswick Ordnance Company, in which he had no financial involvement. The new company agreed to manufacture armaments for the British government and no other. Under his new position, Armstrong worked to bring the old Woolwich Arsenal up to date so that it could build guns designed at Elswick.

However, just when it looked as if the new gun was about to become a great success, a great deal of opposition to the gun arose, both inside the army and from rival arms manufacturers, particularly Joseph Whitworth of Manchester. Stories were publicised that the new gun was too difficult to use, that it was too expensive, that it was dangerous to use, that it frequently needed repair and so on. All of this smacked of a concerted campaign against Armstrong. Armstrong was able to refute all of these claims in front of various government committees, but he found the constant criticism very wearying and depressing. In 1862 the government decided to stop ordering the new gun and return to muzzle loaders. Also, because of a drop in demand, future orders for guns would be supplied from Woolwich, leaving Elswick without new business. Compensation was eventually agreed with the government for the loss of business to the company, which went on legitimately to sell its products to foreign powers. Speculation that guns were sold to both sides in the American Civil War was unfounded.

== Warships ==
In 1864 the two companies, W. G. Armstrong & Company and Elswick Ordnance Company merged to form Sir W. G. Armstrong & Company. Armstrong had resigned from his employment with the War Office, so there was no longer a conflict of interest. The company turned its attention to naval guns. In 1867 Armstrong reached an agreement with Charles Mitchell, a shipbuilder in Low Walker, whereby Mitchells would build warships and Elswick would provide the guns. The first ship, in 1868 was HMS Staunch, a gunboat.

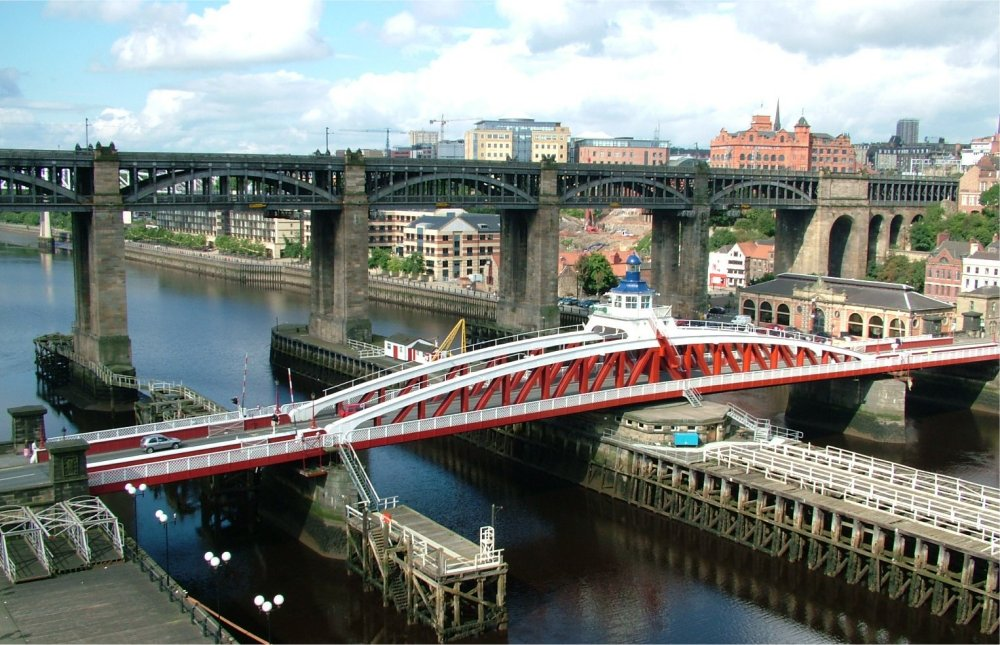
The Swing Bridge in Newcastle

In 1876, because the 18th-century bridge at Newcastle restricted access by ships to the Elswick works, Armstrong's company paid for a new Swing Bridge to be built, so that warships could have their guns fitted at Elswick. In 1882 Armstrong's company merged with Mitchell's to form Sir William Armstrong, Mitchell and Co. Ltd. and in 1884 a shipyard opened at Elswick to specialise in warship production. The first vessels produced were the torpedo cruisers Panther and Leopard for the Austro-Hungarian Navy. The first battleship produced at Elswick was HMS Victoria, launched in 1887. The ship was originally to be named Renown, but the name was changed in honour of the Queen's Golden Jubilee. Armstrong drove the first and last rivets. The ship was ill-fated, as she was involved in a collision with HMS Camperdown just six years later in 1893 and sank with the loss of 358 men, including Vice-Admiral Sir George Tryon. An important customer of the Elswick yard was Japan, which took several cruisers, some of which defeated the Russian fleet at the Battle of Tsushima in 1905. It was claimed that every Japanese gun used in the battle had been provided by Elswick. Elswick was the only factory in the world that could build a battleship and arm it completely.

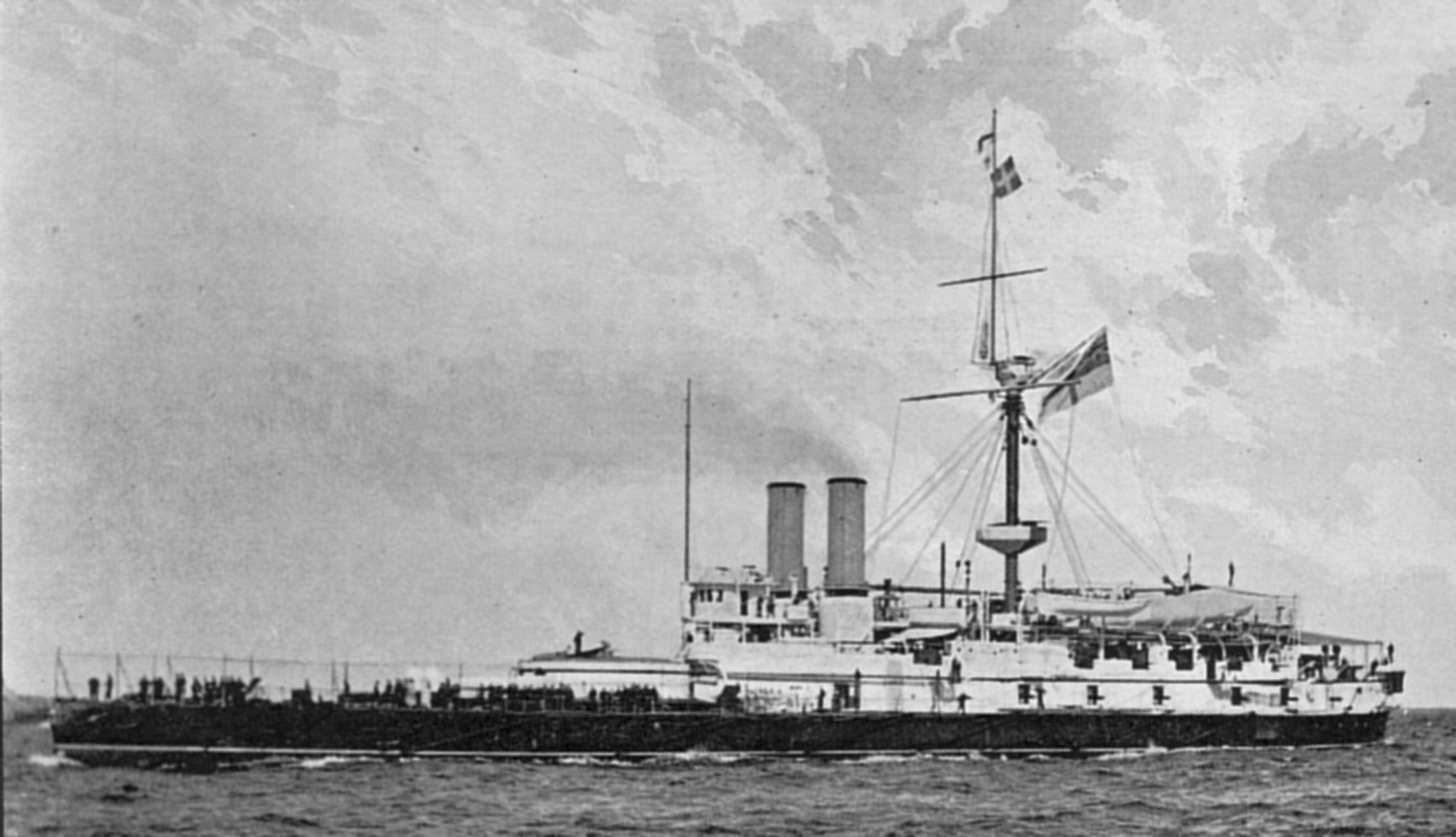
HMS Victoria in 1887

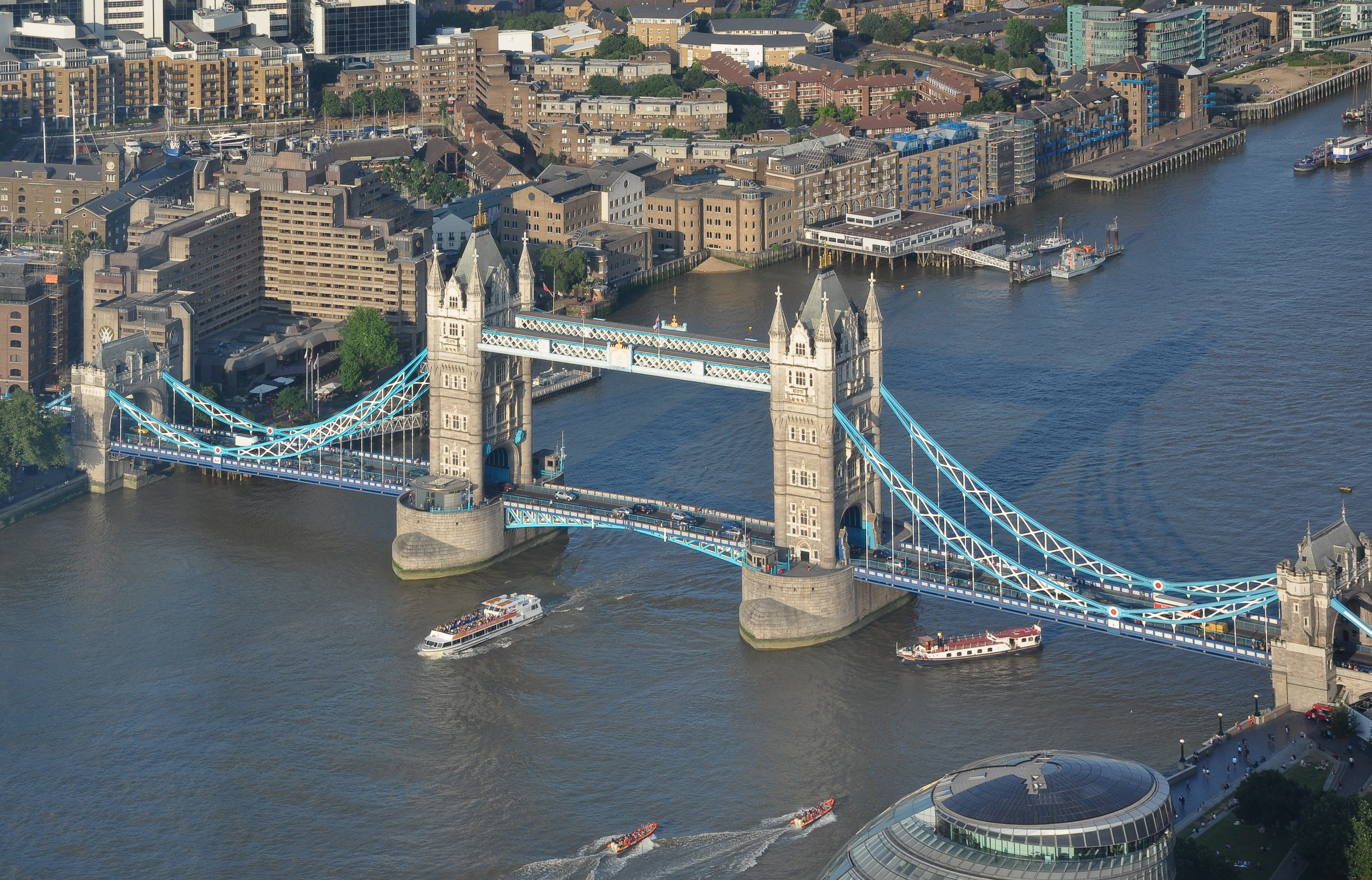
Aerial view of Tower Bridge, London

The Elswick works continued to prosper, and by 1870 stretched for three-quarters of a mile along the riverside. The population of Elswick, which had been 3,539 in 1851, had increased to 27,800 by 1871. In 1894, Elswick built and installed the steam-driven pumping engines, hydraulic accumulators and hydraulic pumping engines to operate London's Tower Bridge. In 1897 the company merged with the company of Armstrong's old rival, Joseph Whitworth, and became Sir W. G. Armstrong, Whitworth & Co Ltd. Whitworth was by this time dead.

Armstrong gathered many excellent engineers at Elswick. Notable among them were Andrew Noble and George Wightwick Rendel, whose design of gun-mountings and hydraulic control of gun-turrets were adopted worldwide. Rendel introduced the cruiser as a naval vessel. There was great rivalry and dislike between Noble and Rendel, which became open after Armstrong's death.

== Cragside ==
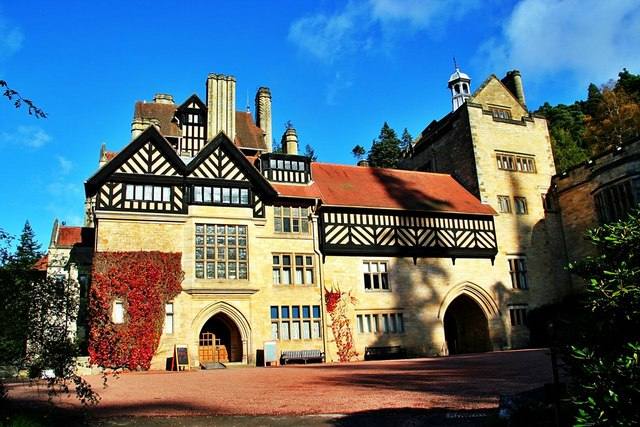
The entrance front of Cragside – Shaw's "Wagnerian" overture

From 1863 onwards, although Armstrong remained the head of his company, he became less involved in its day-to-day running. He appointed several very able men to senior positions and they continued his work. When he married, he acquired a house called Jesmond Dean (sic), which is now demolished, and not to be confused with the nearby Jesmond Dene House. Armstrong's house was to the west of Jesmond Dene, Newcastle, and thus not far from his birthplace, and he began to landscape and improve land that he bought within the Dene. In 1860 he paid local architect John Dobson to design a Banqueting Hall overlooking the Dene, which still survives, though it is now roofless. His house close to Newcastle was convenient for his practice as a solicitor and his work as an industrialist, but when he had more spare time he longed for a house in the country.

He had often visited Rothbury as a child, when he was afflicted by a severe cough, and he had fond memories of the area. In 1863 he bought some land in a steep-sided, narrow valley where the Debdon Burn flows towards the River Coquet near Rothbury. He had the land cleared and supervised the building of a house perched on a ledge of rock, overlooking the burn. He also supervised a programme of planting trees and mosses so as to cover the rocky hillside with vegetation.

His new house was called Cragside, and over the years Armstrong added to the Cragside estate. Eventually the estate was 1,729 acres (7.00 km^{2}) and had seven million trees planted, together with five artificial lakes and 31 miles (50 km) of carriage drives, and his demonstration centre at Cragend Farm Hydraulic Silo. The lakes were used to generate hydro-electricity, and the house was the first in the world to be lit by hydro-electricity, using incandescent lamps provided by the inventor Joseph Swan.

As Armstrong spent less and less time at the Elswick works, he spent more and more time at Cragside, and it became his main home. In 1869 he commissioned the celebrated architect Richard Norman Shaw to enlarge and improve the house, and this was done over a period of 15 years. In 1883 Armstrong gave Jesmond Dene, together with its banqueting hall to the city of Newcastle. He retained his house next to the Dene. Armstrong entertained several eminent guests at Cragside, including the Shah of Persia, the King of Siam, the prime minister of China and the Prince and Princess of Wales.

== Later life ==
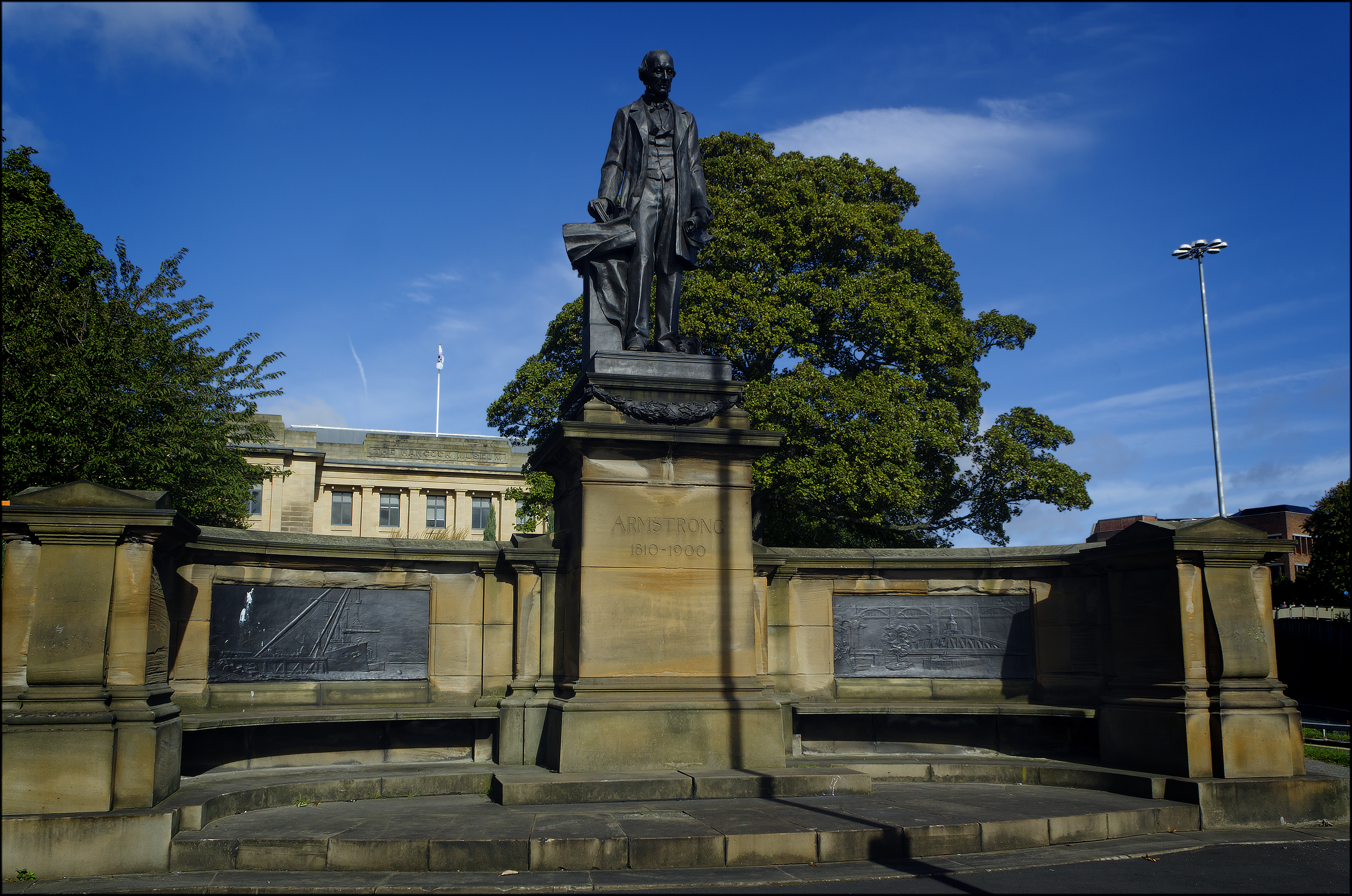
Armstrong statue, Newcastle upon Tyne, in front of the Great North Museum: Hancock which he helped pay for

In 1873 he served as High Sheriff of Northumberland. He was President of the North of England Institute of Mining and Mechanical Engineers from 1872 to 1875. He was elected as the president of the Institution of Civil Engineers in December 1881 and served in that capacity for the next year. He was conferred with Honorary Membership of the Institution of Engineers and Shipbuilders in Scotland in 1884. In 1886, he was persuaded to stand as a Unionist Liberal candidate for Newcastle, but was unsuccessful, coming third in the election. That same year he was presented with the Freedom of the City of Newcastle. In 1887 he was raised to the peerage as Baron Armstrong, of Cragside in the County of Northumberland. His last great project, begun in 1894, was the purchase and restoration of the huge Bamburgh Castle on the Northumberland coast, which remains in the hands of the Armstrong family. His wife, Margaret, died in September 1893, at their house in Jesmond. Armstrong died at Cragside on 27 December 1900, aged ninety. He was buried in Rothbury churchyard, alongside his wife. The couple had no children, and Armstrong's heir was his great-nephew William Watson-Armstrong. He was succeeded as chairman of the company by his one-time protégé, Andrew Noble.

Such was Armstrong's fame as a gun-maker that he is thought to be a possible model for George Bernard Shaw's arms magnate in Major Barbara. The title character in Iain Pears' historical-mystery novel Stone's Fall also has similarities to Armstrong.

== His attitude to armaments ==
There is no evidence that Armstrong agonised over his decision to go into armament production. He once said: "If I thought that war would be fomented, or the interests of humanity suffer, by what I have done, I would greatly regret it. I have no such apprehension." He also said: "It is our province, as engineers to make the forces of matter obedient to the will of man; those who use the means we supply must be responsible for their legitimate application."

== Views on renewable energy ==
Armstrong advocated the use of renewable energy. Stating that coal "was used wastefully and extravagantly in all its applications", he predicted in 1863 that Britain would cease to produce coal within two centuries. As well as advocating the use of hydroelectricity, he also supported solar power, stating that the amount of solar energy received by an area of 1 acre (4,000 m^{2}) in the tropics would "exert the amazing power of 4,000 horses acting for nearly nine hours every day".

== The benefactor ==
Armstrong donated the long wooded gorge of Jesmond Dene to the people of the city of Newcastle upon Tyne in 1883, as well as Armstrong Bridge and Armstrong Park nearby. He was involved in the foundation in 1871 of the College of Physical Science – a forerunner of the University of Newcastle, renamed Armstrong College in 1906. He was President of the Literary and Philosophical Society of Newcastle upon Tyne from 1860 until his death, as well as twice president of the Institution of Mechanical Engineers. Armstrong gave £11,500 towards the building of Newcastle's Hancock Natural History Museum, which was completed in 1882. This sum is equivalent to over £555,000 in 2010. Lord Armstrong's generosity extended beyond his death. In 1901 his heir, William Watson-Armstrong gave £100,000 (equivalent to £10,626,992 in 2025), for the building of the new Royal Victoria Infirmary in Newcastle upon Tyne. Its original 1753 building at Forth Banks near the River Tyne was inadequate and impossible to expand. In 1903 the barony of Armstrong was revived in favour of William Watson-Armstrong.

== Honours ==
- In 1846 he was made a Fellow of the Royal Society (FRS).
- In 1850 he received the Telford Medal from the Institution of Civil Engineers.
- In 1859 William Armstrong was knighted as a Knight Bachelor (Kt).
- He was made a Companion of the Order of the Bath in the Civil Division
- In 1874 he was elected an International Member of the American Philosophical Society.
- In 1878 he received the Albert Medal from the Royal Society of Arts.
- In 1886 he was awarded the Freedom of the City of Newcastle.
- In 1887 he was raised to the peerage as a Hereditary peer, allowing him to sit in the House of Lords. He took the title Baron Armstrong, of Cragside in the County of Northumberland.
- In 1887 he was elected to honorary membership of the Manchester Literary and Philosophical Society
- In 1891 he received the Bessemer Gold Medal from the Iron and Steel Institute.

Honorary Degrees

Location	Date	School	Degree
England	1862	University of Cambridge	Doctor of Laws (LL.D)
England	1870	University of Oxford	Doctor of Civil Law (DCL)
England	1882	University of Durham	Doctor of Civil Law (DCL)

== Arms ==
Coat of arms of William Armstrong, 1st Baron Armstrong

Crest
A Dexter Arm embowed in Armour holding a Sledge Hammer encircled at the elbow by a Wreath of Oak all proper
Escutcheon
Gules a Tilting spear in fess Or headed Argent between two Dexter Arms embowed in Armour fesswise proper Hands of the last
Supporters
On either side a Smith shirt sleeves rolled up, leather apron, and dark blue breeches, dark grey stockings, holding over the shoulder in the exterior hand a Sledge Hammer all proper
Motto
Fortis in armis

=== Publications ===
- Armstrong, W.G. (18 April 1840), "On the application of a column of water as a motive power for driving machinery", The Mechanics' Magazine, 32 (871), J.C. Robertson: 530–536, illus. p. 529
- —— (1868). "On the transmission of power by water pressure, with the application to railway goods stations, forge and foundry cranes, and blast-furnace hoists". Proc. Inst. Mech. Eng. 19 (1868). Institution of Mechanical Engineers: 21–26. doi:10.1243/PIME_PROC_1868_019_007_02.
- —— (1869), "Description of the hydraulic swing bridge for the North Eastern Railway over the River Ouse near Goole", Proc. Inst. Mech. Eng., 20 (1869), Institution of Mechanical Engineers: 121–126, doi:10.1243/PIME_PROC_1869_020_013_02, Plates: 17–24

Professional and academic associations
Preceded by James Kennedy	President of the Institution of Mechanical Engineers; 1861–1862	Succeeded by Robert Napier
Preceded by John Penn	President of the Institution of Mechanical Engineers; 1868–1869	Succeeded by John Ramsbottom
Preceded by James Abernethy	President of the Institution of Civil Engineers; December 1881 – December 1882	Succeeded by James Brunlees
Peerage of the United Kingdom
New creation	Baron Armstrong; 1887–1900	Extinct
