= Crag Mill railway station =

Disused railway station in Belford, Northumberland

Crag Mill
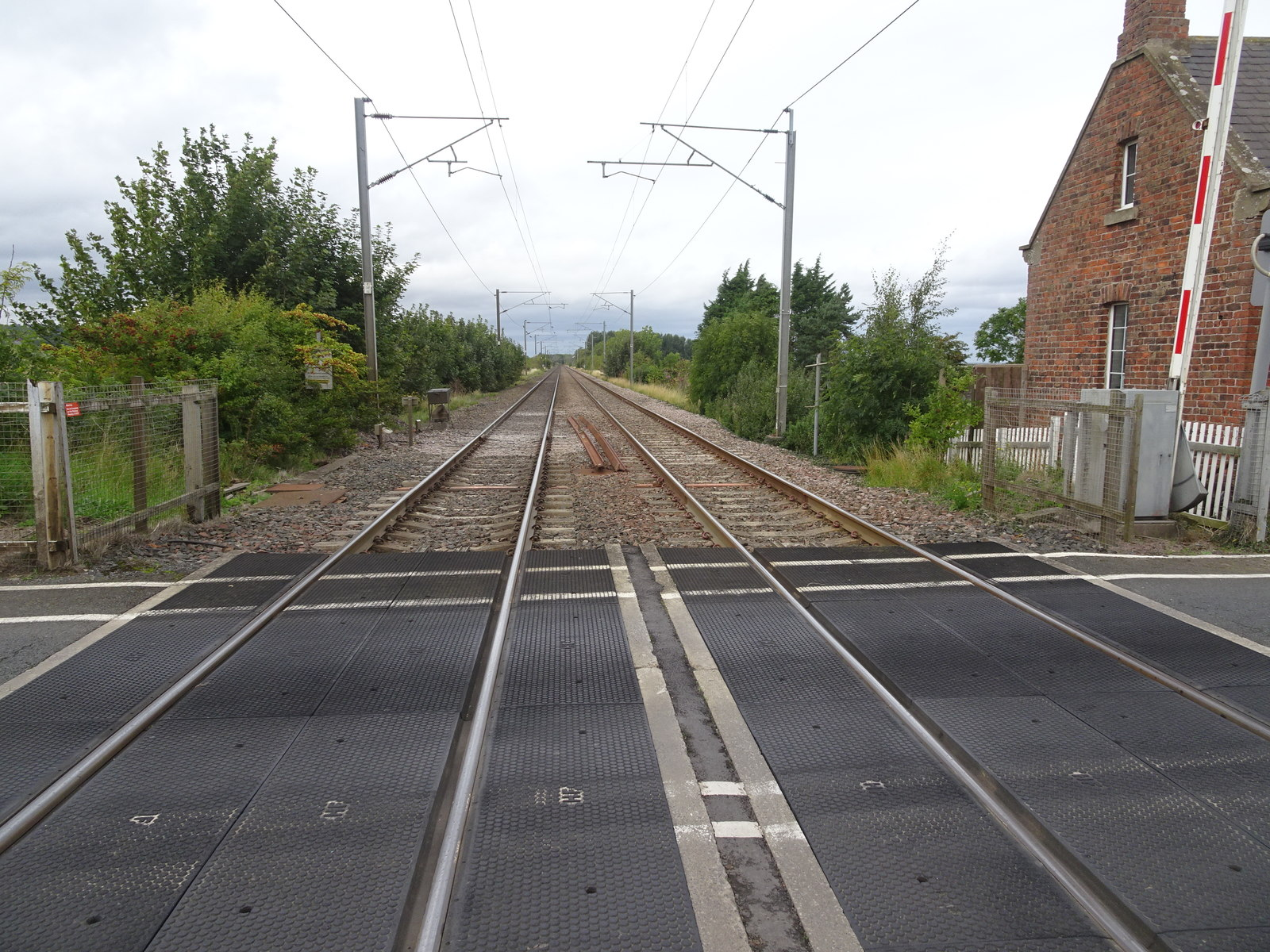
- The site of the station, looking northwest towards Smeafield, in 2018

General information
- Location: Belford, Northumberland; England
- Coordinates: 55.6078°N 1.8178°W
- Grid reference: NU115349
- Platforms: 2

Other information
- Status: Disused

History
- Original company: North Eastern Railway

Key dates
- January 1862: Opened
- October 1877: Closed to passengers
Location

Crag Mill railway station served the village of Belford, Northumberland, England from around 1862 to 1877 on the East Coast Main Line.

== History ==
The location was proposed for a station to serve Belford but, in 1846, the local populace organised a petition requesting a station at the eventual site of Belford station. In 1862, passengers attending the Northumberland Agricultural Society's annual show were advised to use this station rather than Belford.

The station first appeared in the NER working timetable of February 1871. The station was situated northwest of the level crossing on Cragmill Lane. The station was very short lived. Crag Mill disappeared from the Bradshaw timetable in October 1877. The date on which the station closed completely is unknown.

Preceding station	Historical railways	Following station
Belford (Northumberland); Line open, station closed	North Eastern Railway; East Coast Main Line	Smeafield; Line open, station closed
