= Beal railway station =

Disused railway station in Northumberland, England

Beal
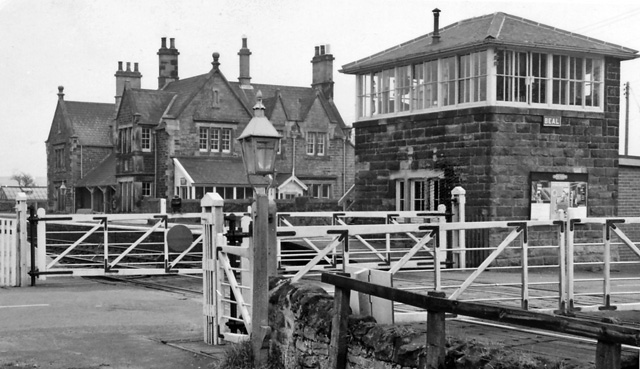
- The level crossing at the station in 1965

General information
- Location: Beal, Northumberland; England
- Coordinates: 55.6769°N 1.9029°W
- Grid reference: NU062426
- Platforms: 2

Other information
- Status: Disused

History
- Original company: York, Newcastle and Berwick Railway
- Pre-grouping: North Eastern Railway
- Post-grouping: LNER; British Rail (North Eastern)

Key dates
- 29 March 1847: Opened
- 29 January 1968: Closed
Location

Beal railway station, also known as Beal for Holy Island railway station, was a railway station that served the village of Beal, Northumberland, England from 1847 to 1968 on the East Coast Main Line.

== History ==
The station opened on 29 March 1847 by the York, Newcastle and Berwick Railway. It was situated just under a mile along the Holy Island Road which runs from the A1 to Holy Island. There was no footbridge or subway so the passengers had to switch between platforms via a level crossing. A large stone-built goods warehouse was provided to the northwest of the station which was entered via one of the two sidings. In 1941, Beal was one of the few stations to remain open during the period of the Second World War, the others being Alnmouth, Chathill, Tweedmouth and Belford. The goods warehouse was demolished sometime after British Rail formed. The station closed on 29 January 1968.

The local rail user group SENRUG has been campaigning since September 2016 to have local services on the Newcastle - Berwick - Edinburgh corridor increased with regular local commuter services extended northwards from Morpeth to Berwick-upon-Tweed and Edinburgh. As part of this campaign they have proposed that the former station at Beal should be reopened so as to improve public transport access to Lindisfarne and St Cuthbert's Way.

Preceding station	Historical railways	Following station
Smeafield; Line open, station closed	York, Newcastle and Berwick Railway; East Coast Main Line	Goswick; Line open, station closed
