= Smeafield railway station =

Disused railway station in Northumberland, England

Smeafield
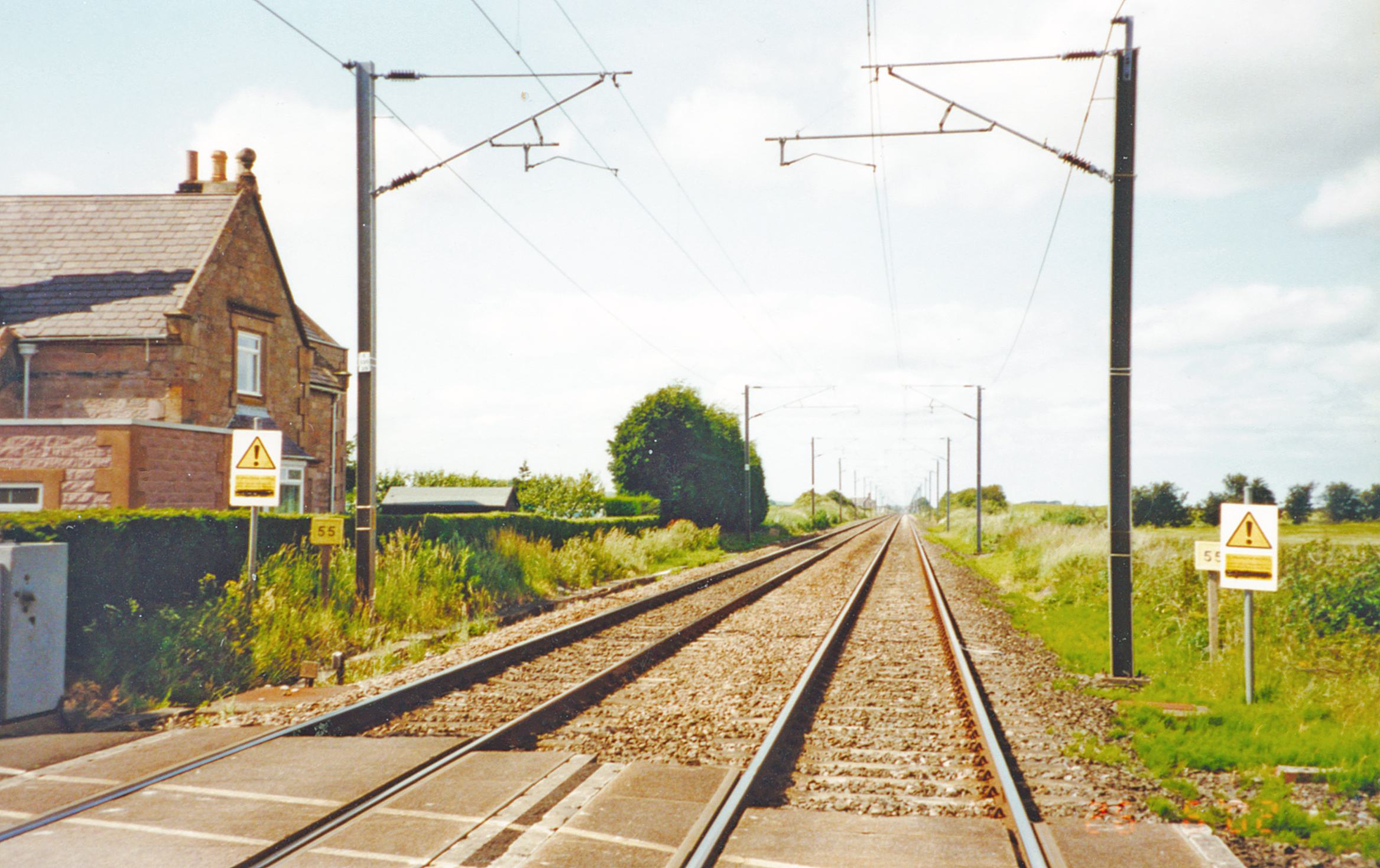
- The site of the station in 2002

General information
- Location: Smeafield, Northumberland; England
- Coordinates: 55.6355°N 1.8538°W
- Grid reference: NU093380
- Platforms: 2

Other information
- Status: Disused

History
- Original company: North Eastern Railway
- Pre-grouping: North Eastern Railway
- Post-grouping: LNER

Key dates
- February 1871: Opened
- 1 May 1930: Closed to passengers
Location

Smeafield railway station served the farmstead of Smeafield, Northumberland, England from 1871 to 1930 on the East Coast Main Line.

== History ==
The station was shown on the NER timetable of February 1871 by the North Eastern Railway, which was the station's private use for market stops on Tuesdays and Saturdays but the station was publicly used in January 1875 when it first appeared in the Bradshaw timetable. The station was situated 500 yards east of the A1. The station wasn't used much during its lifespan and it disappeared from the timetable at the end of 1929. The station later closed to passengers on 1 May 1930 but the date of complete closure of the station is unknown, although it may have closed on the same date due to the station not having a coal or goods depot.

Preceding station	Historical railways	Following station
Crag Mill; Line open, station closed	York, Newcastle and Berwick Railway; East Coast Main Line	Beal; Line open, station closed
