= EE1 =

EE1 or ee1 may refer to:

- Empire Earth (video game), a video game
- Epsilon Euskadi ee1, a racing car
- LNER Class EE1, an electric locomotive
