= Goswick railway station =

Disused railway station in Northumberland, England

Goswick
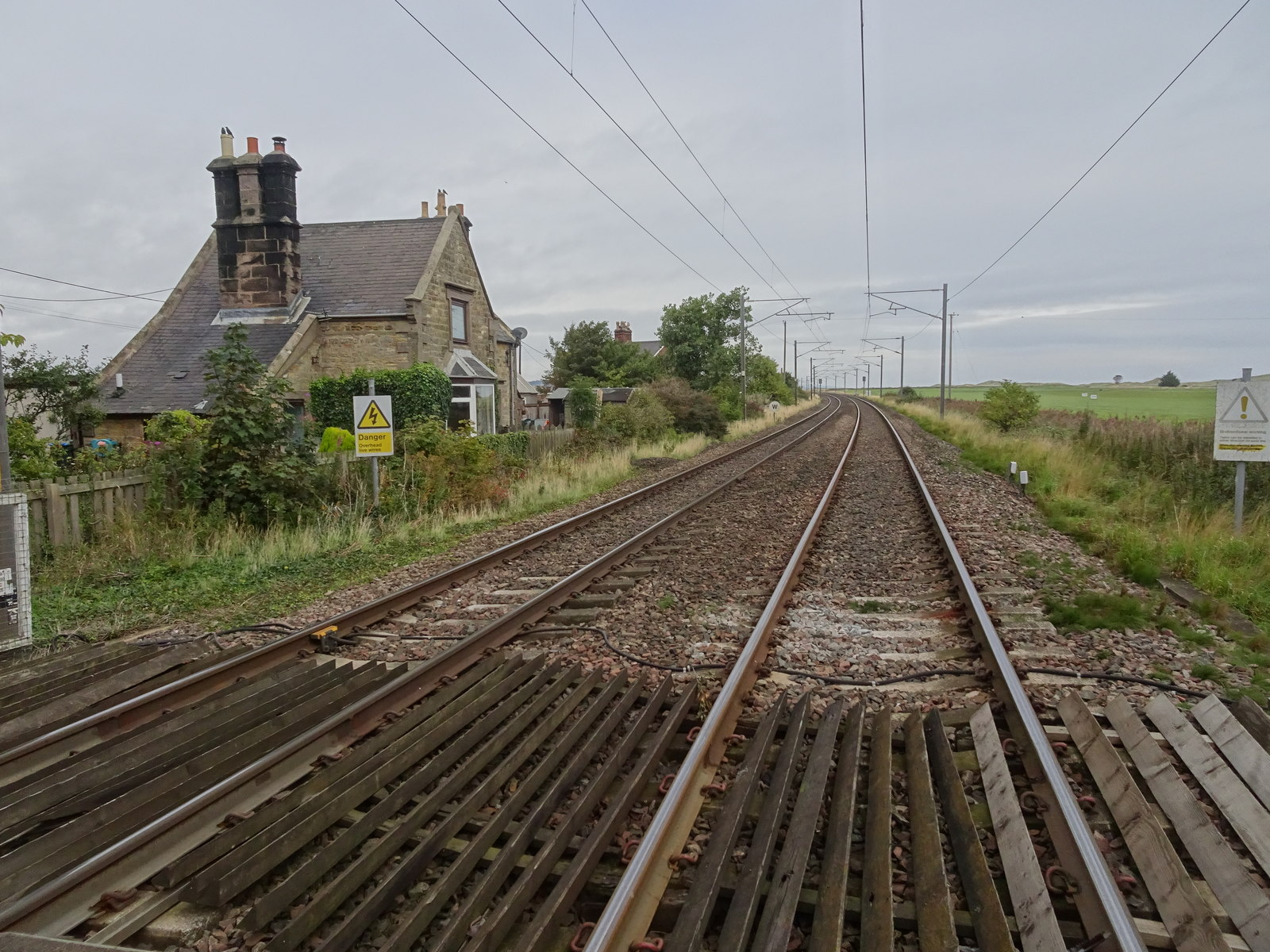
- The site of the station, looking northwest to Scremerston, in 2018

General information
- Location: Goswick, Northumberland; England
- Coordinates: 55.7063°N 1.9286°W
- Grid reference: NU046459
- Platforms: 2

Other information
- Status: Disused

History
- Original company: North Eastern Railway
- Pre-grouping: North Eastern Railway
- Post-grouping: LNER; British Railways (North Eastern)

Key dates
- November 1870: Opened as Wind Mill Hill
- 1 January 1898: Renamed Goswick
- 5 May 1941: Temporarily closed to passengers
- 7 October 1946: Reopened
- 15 September 1958: Closed to passengers again
- 10 August 1964: Closed completely
Location

Goswick railway station served the hamlet of Goswick, Northumberland, England from 1870 to 1964 on the East Coast Main Line.

== History ==
The station first opened on 6 March 1850 but it wasn't open to passengers. The earliest evidence of passenger use was on 11 May 1858, but only for those attending the Goswick farm sale. It was included in the Newcastle Journal as Windmill Hill on 6 January 1853 but only excursion trains stopped here. Regular passenger service began in November 1870.

The station's name was changed to Goswick on 1 January 1898. It was situated at a level crossing of an unnamed minor lane 2 miles (3.2 km) east from the A1. It was close to the Berwick-upon-Tweed Golf Club. A goods siding was northwest of the down platform. However, a mission room was established which joined the goods siding. This was established at the end of the nineteenth century, and this eventually became Wind Mill Hill Presbyterian Church. The station closed to passengers in late 1941 after a strafing attack by the Luftwaffe when a local passenger train was in the station. Six people suffered minor injuries, but the station was reopened on 7 October 1946, although Sunday services were not restored. An accident occurred on 26 October 1947 near the station when the Flying Scotsman derailed due to the driver failing to stop at the signals and the guard not reading the notice of the diversions at Haymarket TMD. The station house was used as a triage for the injured and the church at the goods sidings was used as a mortuary for the 28 people that were killed. Three other accidents have occurred here, in August 1907, March 1922, and October 1953.

The station closed to passengers on 15 September 1958, and completely on 10 August 1964 after the last goods service on 10 April 1964 had stopped.

Preceding station	Historical railways	Following station
Beal; Line open, station closed	North Eastern Railway; East Coast Main Line	Scremerston; Line open, station closed
