= Beal, Northumberland =

Village in Northumberland, in England

Coordinates: 55.677°N 1.897°W

Beal
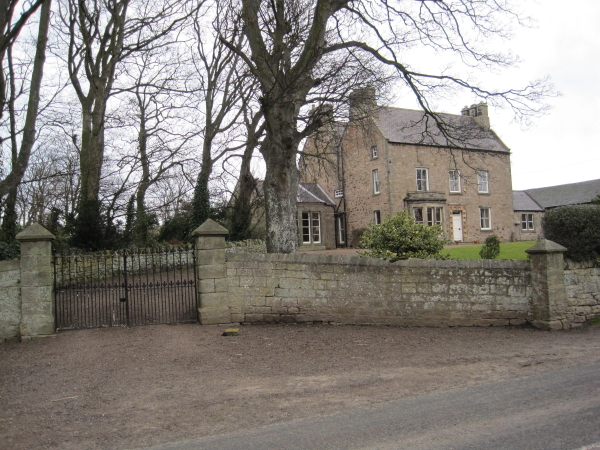
- Beale House

- Location within Northumberland
- OS grid reference: NU065427
- Unitary authority: Northumberland
- Ceremonial county: Northumberland
- Region: North East
- Country: England
- Sovereign state: United Kingdom
- Post town: BERWICK-UPON-TWEED
- Postcode district: TD15
- Dialling code: 01289
- Police: Northumbria
- Fire: Northumberland
- Ambulance: North East
- UK Parliament: North Northumberland

Beal is a village in Northumberland, in England. It is situated a short distance inland from the North Sea coast, and lies on the link road between the A1 and Lindisfarne. The East Coast Main Line runs to the west of the village but the station was closed in the 1960s. The station site has been landscaped and includes a Peckett 0-4-0ST steam locomotive and an ex-North Eastern Railway cast metal warning sign.

== History ==
The place-name Beal derives from the Old English 'beo-hyll', which means 'bee hill'.

== Governance ==
Beal is in the parliamentary constituency of Berwick-upon-Tweed.

== Economy ==
The area is largely agricultural in outlook.

There is a pub at Beal situated on the main road called The Lindisfarne Inn. It re-opened after being refurbished and was renamed having previously been named The Plough.

The Barn at Beal is a visitor centre with various wild birds and looks at the link between farming and the local environment.

There is a small caravan site located at Brock Mill farmhouse and there are a number of bed-and-breakfast outlets.

== Transport ==
The following bus services operate to Beal (October 2011) - the A1 minibus link from Newcastle operated by Holy Island minibuses and 477 from Berwick upon Tweed by Perrymans Buses.

The South East Northumberland Rail Users Group would like to see the station re-opened for local and tourist (for Lindisfarne) traffic.
