= HM Tug Char =

HM Tug Char, formally the North Eastern Railway tug Stranton, was a ship requisitioned by the Admiralty during the Great War.

Char was lost at sea on 16 January 1915.

== History ==
HM Tug Char was built by JP Rennoldson & Sons at South Shields as the tug Stranton for the North Eastern Railway (NER) for use at West Hartlepool Docks. It was launched on 12 June 1899 and was completed in August of that year. It had a two-cylinder engine of 98 rhp.

On 8 July 1913, Stranton ran aground off of Middleton Sands whilst assisting the Swedish barque Meda. During the assistance, Stranton collided with a submerged object, damaging her propellers, Stranton was left adrift. It took two attempted rescues by the RNLI at Hartlepool but on the second, the Stranton's captain, J.P. Whale, elected to stay behind. Stranton was eventually refloated and taken to Newcastle for repair and soon after returned to West Hartlepool Dock for work.

In November 1914, Stranton was requisitioned by the Admiralty for use during the First World War.

== Admiralty service ==
On 17 November 1914, Stranton was requisitioned for war service by the Admiralty. Stranton was to work as a unarmed boarding vessel, as part of the North Downs Flotilla based in Ramsgate.

The crew of Stranton requested that they stay with Stranton, now named HM Tug Char, during its war service. Most of the crew joined the Mercantile Marine Reserve, with the captain joining the Royal Naval Reserve. The NER crew where supplemented by a further seven members of the Royal Navy or the Royal Naval Reserve and two members of the Royal Marine Light Infantry.

Char's crew were part of HMS Pembroke, the naval designation for HMNB Chatham.

== Loss ==
On 16 January 1915 at 0130, Char was inspecting the steamship SS Erivan in high seas when a collision occurred to Char below the waterline, causing Char to take on water. The crew of Char could be heard screaming for help as it drifted into the storm. The captain of Erivan sent out a distress beacon which was answered by the Deal Lifeboat, which undertook a search for the Char and its crew but nothing was found. Later that day, the crew of Char was posted as Lost at Sea.

To date, the location of HM Tug Char is unknown but is believed to be in the area around the former South Goodwin Light Vessel.

== Aftermath ==
On the 20th January 1915, a memorial service was held in St. George's Church in Ramsgate.

Soon after the collision, Erivan was taken to Dover Harbour where it was later repaired.

== Technical Details ==
Char was described by the NER Magazine in February 1915 as being:

Length: 105 ft 4in

Beam: 22 ft 1in

Depth: 9 ft 7in

Horsepower: 98 hp
