= Belford railway station (England) =

Disused railway station in Northumberland, England

Belford
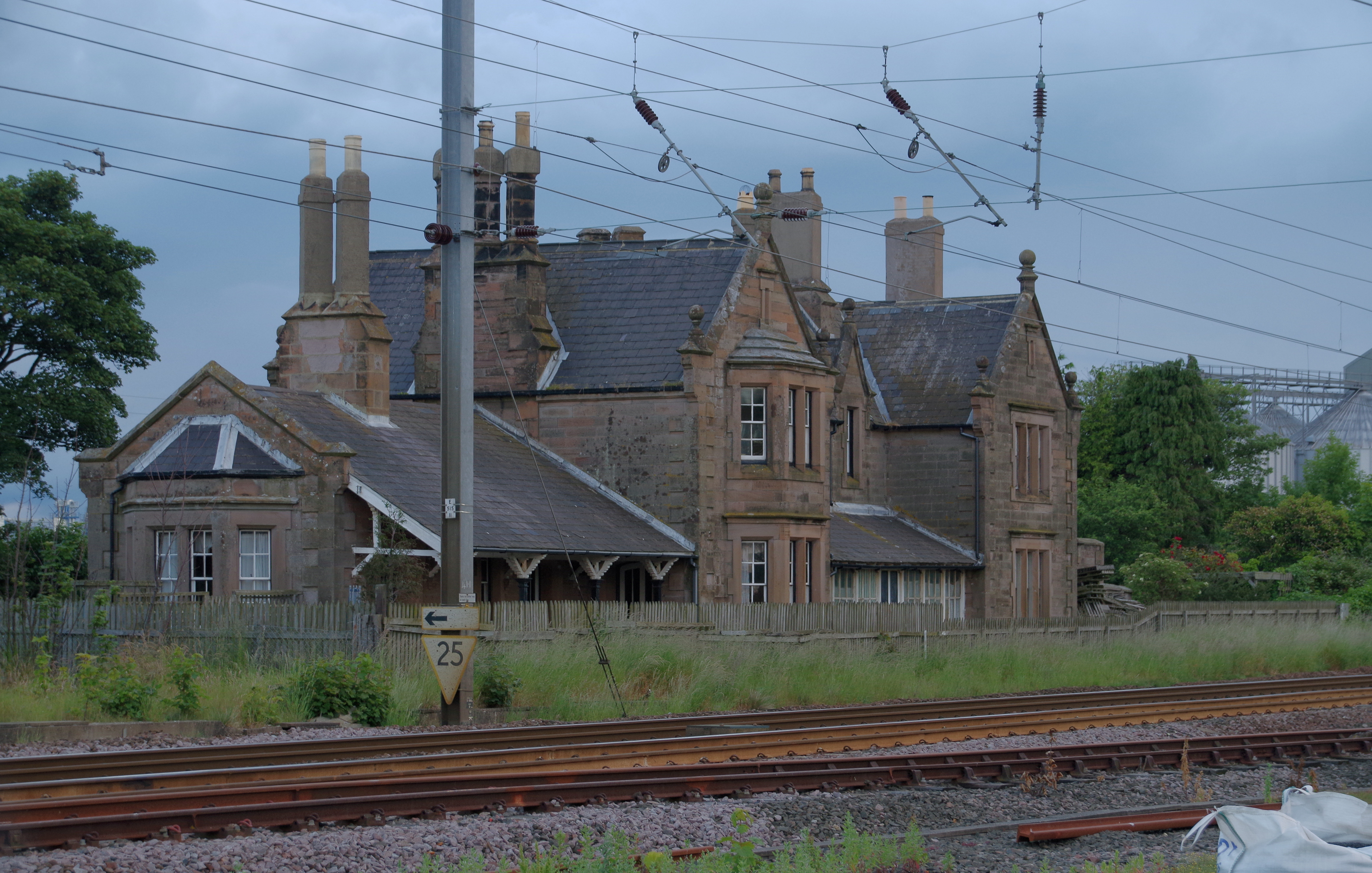
- Northbound station building in July 2014

General information
- Location: Belford, Northumberland; England
- Coordinates: 55.596317°N 1.802411°W
- Grid reference: NU125336
- Platforms: 2

Other information
- Status: Disused

History
- Original company: Newcastle and Berwick Railway
- Pre-grouping: North Eastern Railway
- Post-grouping: London & North Eastern Railway; Eastern Region of British Railways

Key dates
- 29 March 1847: Opened
- 29 January 1968: Closed
Location

Belford railway station is a disused station situated on the East Coast Main Line between the current Chathill and Berwick-upon-Tweed stations serving the village of Belford. It opened on 29 March 1847, closing on 29 January 1968. Today only the northbound station building remains.

After a 2010 plan to rebuild the station did not proceed, in 2015, Berwick Town Council allocated £100,000 to investigate reopening the station. The local rail user group SENRUG has been campaigning since September 2016 to have local services on the Newcastle - Berwick - Edinburgh corridor increased with regular local commuter services extended northwards from Morpeth to Berwick-upon-Tweed and Edinburgh. As part of this campaign they have proposed that the former station at Belford should be reopened so as to improve public transport access to the Northumberland Coast and St Cuthbert's Way.

In March 2020, a bid was made to the Restoring Your Railway fund to get funds for a feasibility study into reinstating the station. This bid was unsuccessful.

Preceding station	Historical railways	Following station
Lucker; Line open, station closed	York, Newcastle and Berwick Railway; East Coast Main Line	Crag Mill; Line open, station closed
