= Belford, Northumberland =

Village and civil parish in Northumberland, England

Coordinates: 55.598°N 1.828°W

Belford
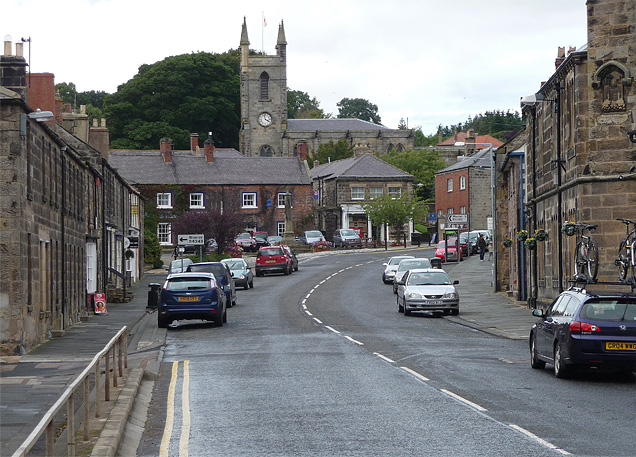
- High Street, Belford

- Location within Northumberland
- Population: 1,313 (2021 Census)
- OS grid reference: NU108339
- Unitary authority: Northumberland
- Ceremonial county: Northumberland
- Region: North East
- Country: England
- Sovereign state: United Kingdom
- Post town: BELFORD
- Postcode district: NE70
- Dialling code: 01668
- Police: Northumbria
- Fire: Northumberland
- Ambulance: North East
- UK Parliament: North Northumberland

Belford is a village and civil parish in Northumberland, England, about halfway between Alnwick and Berwick-upon-Tweed, around 4 km inland from the east coast and just off the Great North Road, the A1. At the 2001 census it had a population of 1,055, increasing to 1,258 at the 2011 Census.

Belford is surrounded by rich pastoral farmland, and to the west of the village is found one of the better rock climbing locations in the county, Bowden Doors.

== Governance ==
Belford is in the parliamentary constituency of Berwick-upon-Tweed and is currently served by David Smith (Labour). Belford is served by Northumberland County Council.

== Landmarks ==
=== Belford Hall ===
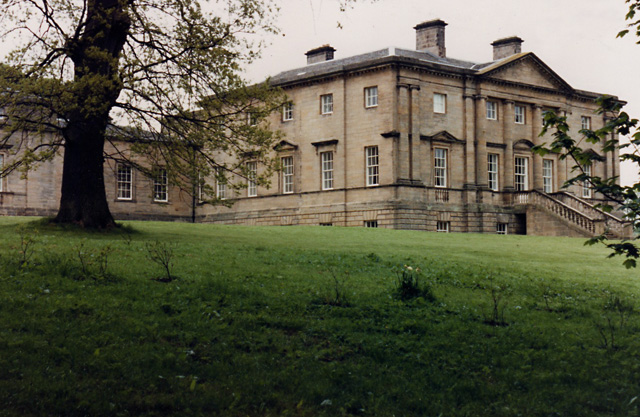
Belford Hall

Belford Hall is a Grade I listed building, an 18th-century mansion house.

The Manor of Belford was acquired by the Dixon family in 1726 and in 1752 Abraham Dixon built a mansion house in a Palladian style to a design by architect James Paine. In 1770 heiress Margaret Dixon married William Brown. Their daughter later married Newcastle upon Tyne merchant, Lt. Col. William Clark, Deputy Lieutenant and High Sheriff of Northumberland who, in 1818, remodelled the house and added two new wings, with the assistance of architect John Dobson.

An extensive park, created in the mid 18th century, retains several original features and has been designated a conservation area. An 18th-century folly in the park is a Grade II listed building. During World War II the Hall was requisitioned by the Army and thereafter became neglected and dilapidated. In the 1980s it was acquired by the Northern Heritage Trust, renovated and restored and converted to residential flats.

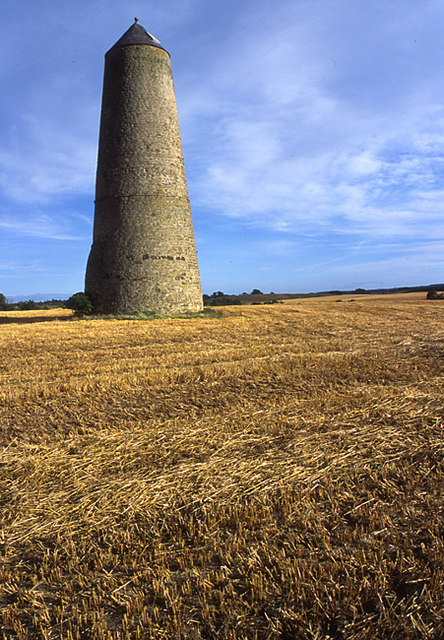
Spindlestone Ducket Mill

=== Spindlestone Ducket Mill ===
This is located about 3 km east of Belford, and is an 18th-century tapering cylindrical stone tower with a conical roof of Welsh slate. Its usage is uncertain, being sometimes classified as a windmill and sometimes as a dovecote.

=== Westhall ===
Westhall is a privately owned Victorian house built in the style of the castellated fortified house that it replaced on the same site. The moat that surrounded the original building can still clearly be seen. It is now in use as a farmhouse.

== History ==
For much of the Middle Ages, Belford was at the forefront of the ongoing border conflict between the Scots and the English and it is believed that only Well House escaped damage or destruction at the hands of Scottish raiders. In 1272 it is recorded that Walter de Huntercombe, the Lord of the Manor, was charged with 'assisting pirates'. They had seized, by force, goods belonging to some wealthy Spanish merchants and landed with their booty on Holy Island.

In 1726, A wealthy city merchant, Abraham Dixon bought the Belford Estate. He made improvements which enhanced the fortunes of its inhabitants significantly including purchasing a licence in 1742 allowing him to hold a weekly market and two annual fairs at Belford. His son continued improvements after his death in 1746 and by 1770, a visitor was able to report the existence of a woollen mill, a tannery, collieries and a 'large lime kiln'. Improvements to hygiene were also imposed upon the inhabitants with the forced removal of muck heaps from the houses and the banning of swine.

Larger market towns have gradually replaced Belford in importance and the location of the station outside of the town itself did nothing to halt a gradual decline in its fortunes since the end of the 19th century. Many of the features of its heyday have been retained however.

== Transport ==
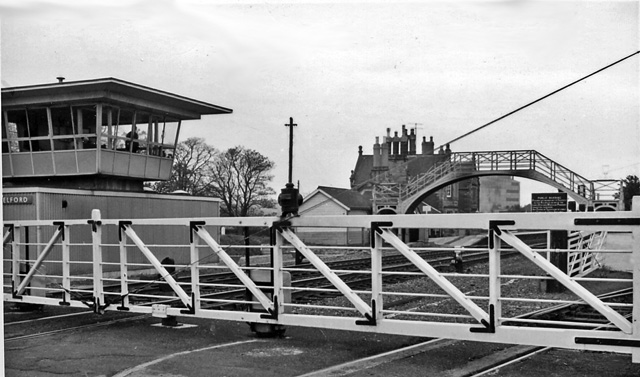
The former Belford railway station in 1965

Belford was for many years a coaching stop on the main A1 road from London to Edinburgh, which passed through the village. However, in 1983 a bypass was opened, and, freed from the constant traffic and pollution, the village could hold events on the High Street and in the Market Place once again.

Belford railway station opened on 29 March 1847. Freight services ceased on 7 June 1965 and the station finally closed for passenger services on 20 January 1968. However, on 8 February 2010 Northumberland County Council agreed plans to resume passenger services by constructing a new platform, access and car parking.

== Education ==
St Mary's Church of England Voluntary Aided Middle School in Williams Way, Belford provides mainstream education for just under 100 boys and girls aged from nine to thirteen.

== Churches ==
The Church of England parish church of St Mary is an Early English Gothic stone building on a hill overlooking the village square. Its tower has two bells. St Mary's was built in about 1200, rebuilt in 1615, and renovated in 1700 and 1828.

Belford has also a United Reformed Church.

== Sports ==
In 2008, Belford Junior Football Club was awarded the Queen's Award for Voluntary Service.

== Public services ==
Belford has an active local history society which has published a series of books in recent years, the latest being 'Bygone Belford' (2010). In 1995 the society carried out A Survey of Belford. A booklet was published and the text of the survey is available online (see external links). A similar survey had been conducted quarter of a century earlier, in 1970.

== Notable people ==
Births:

- Marcus Dods, Scottish divine and biblical scholar, was born in Belford in 1834
- Robert Mason (Liberal politician) was born in Belford in 1857 and was a member of parliament from 1918 to 1922
- Michael Clark (Canadian politician) was born in Belford in 1861 and moved to Canada in 1902
- Sir William Coldstream, artist, was born in Belford, 28 February 1908
- William Wilson Allen, VC (Rorke's Drift) lived at Belford Moor, (now Belford Mains) as a child.
- Lucy Bronze, an English female footballer who plays for Manchester City Ladies, lived for a time in Belford

Deaths:

- Geoffrey Hornblower Cock, MC, World War I flying ace died in Belford in 1980

== Belford in the media ==
Belford is mentioned in "The Great Race" episode of the 1970s sitcom Whatever Happened to the Likely Lads? when Terry claims he overtook Bob in a bicycle race by cycling through the town whereas Bob used the A1 bypass.

Belford was featured on the TV programme Countryfile on 10 April 1994, following a telephone call to the BBC by a resident. At the time, like other villages in the area, Belford was suffering from an increasing number of power cuts. Inspired by the programme a group was formed and, after much campaigning and lobbying, the electricity supply was improved.

Belford again achieved momentary fame in April 2000 when protests about the closure of Barclays Bank in the village were picked up and used by the mainstream media to illustrate stories of rural decline brought about by bank branch closures. Until the 1980s there was a branch of Lloyds Bank, with limited opening hours towards the end.

During the 2000s a series of major floods affected the villagers causing widespread damage to property. This led to the development of a flood protection scheme for the village termed Natural Flood Management which was developed by a Newcastle University research group in conjunction with the Environment Agency flood levy team

== See also ==
- Middleton Hall
