= Westhall, Northumberland =

Westhall
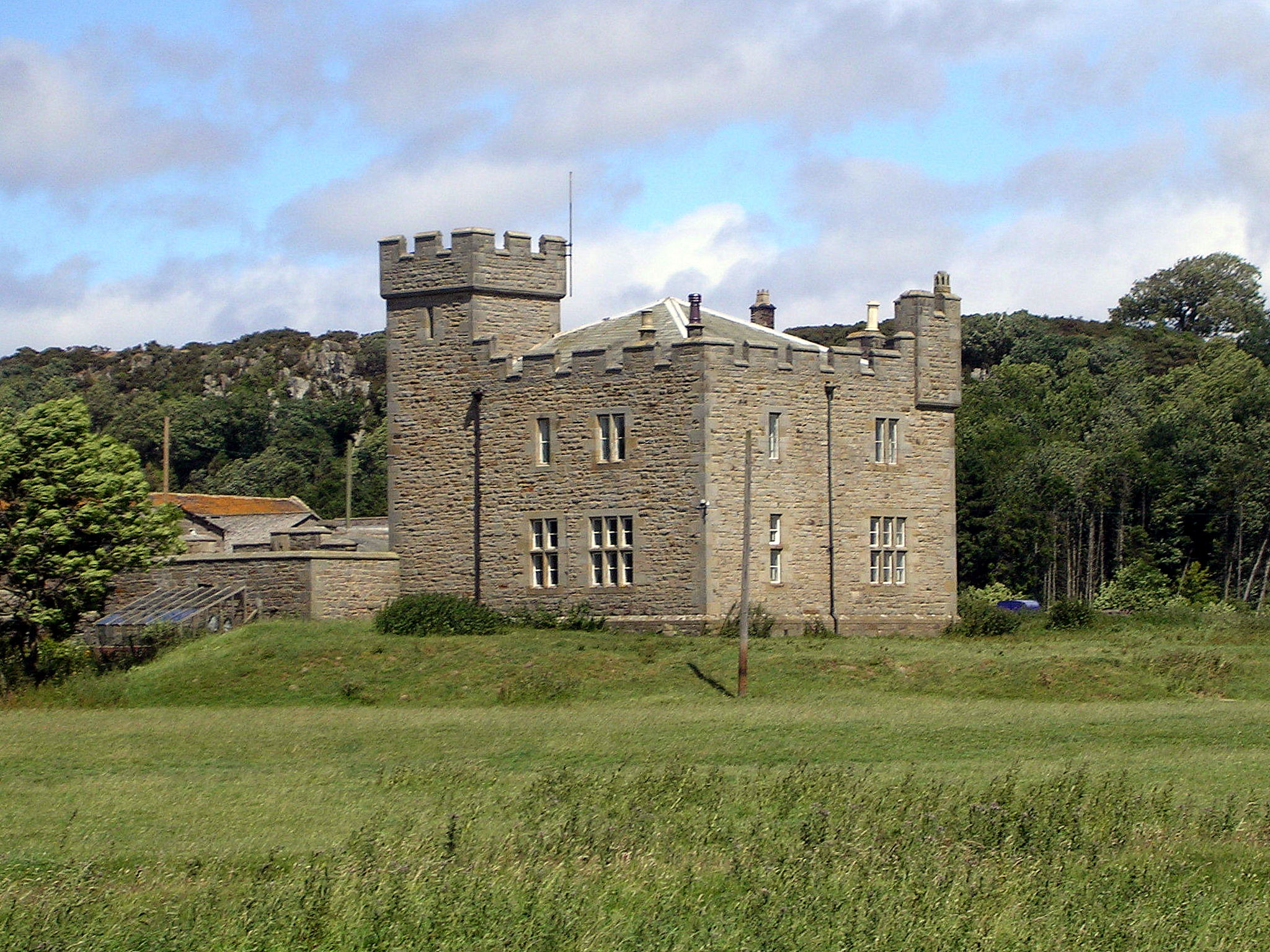

- Location in Northumberland

General information
- Location: Northumberland, England, UK
- Coordinates: 55.601°N 1.838°W
- OS grid: NU103341

Westhall is a privately owned 19th-century castellated house at Belford in Northumberland, England now in use as a farm. It is on a site with older historical associations.

== History ==
Westhall Farm, a little to the north-west of the town and approached by a lane from the Wooler road, is the site of a fortified house that was surrounded by a moat, mentioned in a 15th-century document as the Castrum de Belford. The present house was built in 1837 in a castellated Gothic style.

== Motte and bailey castle ==
It has been suggested that Westhall is the site of a much earlier Motte and bailey castle, however, Davis, in particular, has strong reservations against it:

Earthworks survive, modern farm on site of a possible C11 Motte and Bailey. Later received C15 tower (qv). Recorded as moat to C15 Tower in SMR and PastScape. The 1415 list mentions a castle here held by the D'Arcy family, it later passed to the Conyers, and then to the Forsters and Dixons, before being sold to William Clarke in the 18th Century. Although the presence of the later tower suggests this may have been a high status location the very nearby presence of a strong natural position and already existing Prehistoric camp at Chapel Crag (qv), which has a medieval chapel on it, would suggest this may not be the manorial centre. Philip Davis offers I can see no reason to build a motte when there is a more dramatic, better defended but still easily accessible site so close by. If there was a C11 or C12 castle at Belford I would suggest that the remains of the Chapel at NU10463449 suggest where it was located.
