= Middleton Hall, Middleton, Northumberland =

Coordinates: 55°36′47.0″N 1°51′05.0″W

Middleton Hall
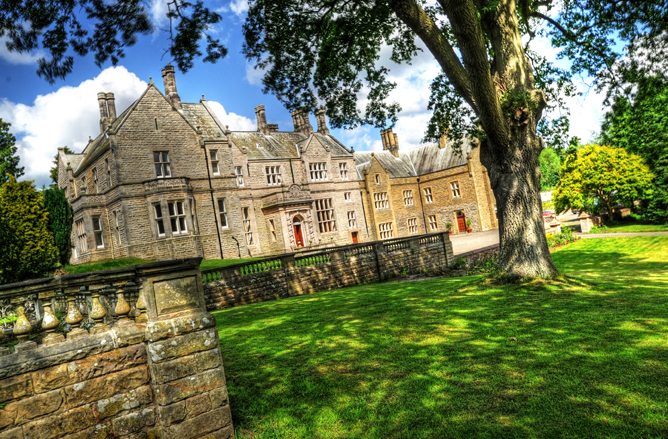
- The Main Hall

- Location within Northumberland
- Location: Northumberland, England

Site notes
- Area: 30 acres (12 ha)

Listed Building – Grade II
- Designated: 22 December 1969
- Reference no.: 1233967

Middleton Hall is a country house near the settlement of Middleton, Northumberland, in that parish, that dates from 1871. It is listed Grade II on the National Heritage List for England.

Middleton Hall sits on a private 30 acres (0.12 km^{2}) estate which includes two large lakes. The Main Hall has 10 bedrooms and is currently being operated as an exclusive hire multiuse estate. It currently has three other properties on its grounds: a boathouse, a folly and the Lake Cottages. The hall recently featured in The Times Best 100 British Holiday destinations.
