= LNER Class EE1 =

Type of electric locomotive

North Eastern Railway EE1
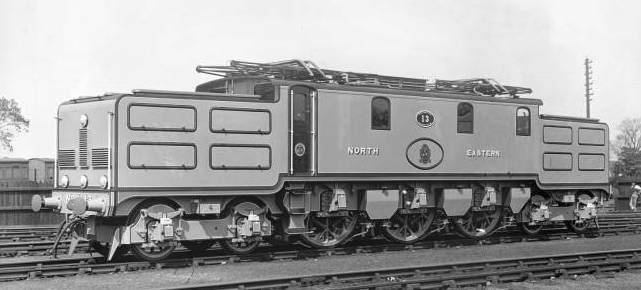
Type and origin
- Power type: Electric
- Builder: North Eastern Railway Darlington Works
- Build date: 1922
- Total produced: 1
Specifications
- Configuration
  - UIC: 2′Co2′
  - Commonwealth: 2-Co-2
- Gauge: 4 ft 8 1/2 in (1,435 mm) standard gauge
- Driver dia.: 6 ft 8 in (2.032 m)
- Loco weight: 110.05 long tons (111.82 t; 123.26 short tons)
- Electric system/s: 1500 V DC Catenary
- Current pickups: Pantograph, 2 off
- Traction motors: 300 hp (224 kW) Metropolitan-Vickers, 6 off
- Train heating: Steam generator
- Train brakes: Vacuum
Performance figures
- Power output: 1,800 hp (1,300 kW)
- Tractive effort: 28,000 lbf (124.6 kN)
Career
- Operators: North Eastern Railway; London and North Eastern Railway; British Railways
- Numbers: NER: 13; LNER: 13; later 6999; BR: 26600
- Axle load class: Route availability 7
- Disposition: Stored 1923–1950; scrapped 1950

Class EE1 (Electric Express 1) was a one-off electric locomotive commissioned by the North Eastern Railway in 1922. Ownership passed to the London and North Eastern Railway in 1923 and to British Railways in 1948.

It was an electrically powered locomotive in the pre-TOPS period.

== Overview ==
In 1919 the North Eastern Railway made plans to electrify its York to Newcastle stretch of the East Coast Main Line, as part of this scheme, they had this locomotive built as a prototype for hauling passenger trains. It had an electrically heated boiler to generate steam for train heating.

The wheels were arranged as in a 4-6-4 steam locomotive with the driving wheels being 6 ft 8 in (2.032 m) diameter. Each of the three driving axles was powered by a pair of traction motors. Electric locomotives of this design were common in continental Europe and the United States, but this was the only example on a British railway.

After grouping in 1923 the NER's successor, the London and North Eastern Railway dropped the electrification project so (apart from some trials on the Shildon line) the locomotive was never used. It survived into British Railways ownership but was withdrawn in August 1950, and scrapped on 15 December 1950.

In common with other LNER electric locomotives, no classification was given to this locomotive until 4 October 1945, when no. 13 was classified EE1 (Electric Express 1). In May 1946, no. 13 was renumbered to 6999; and under British Railways, it became no. 26600 in 1948.

== Specification ==
- Numbers: (NER) 13; (LNER) 6999; (BR) 26600
- Wheel arrangement: 2-Co-2
- Introduced: 1922
- Builder: North Eastern Railway
- Motors: 6 x 300 hp (220 kW), Metropolitan-Vickers
- Total power: 1,800 hp (1,342 kW)
- Supply: 1,500 V DC overhead
