= Chill October =

Painting by John Everet Millais

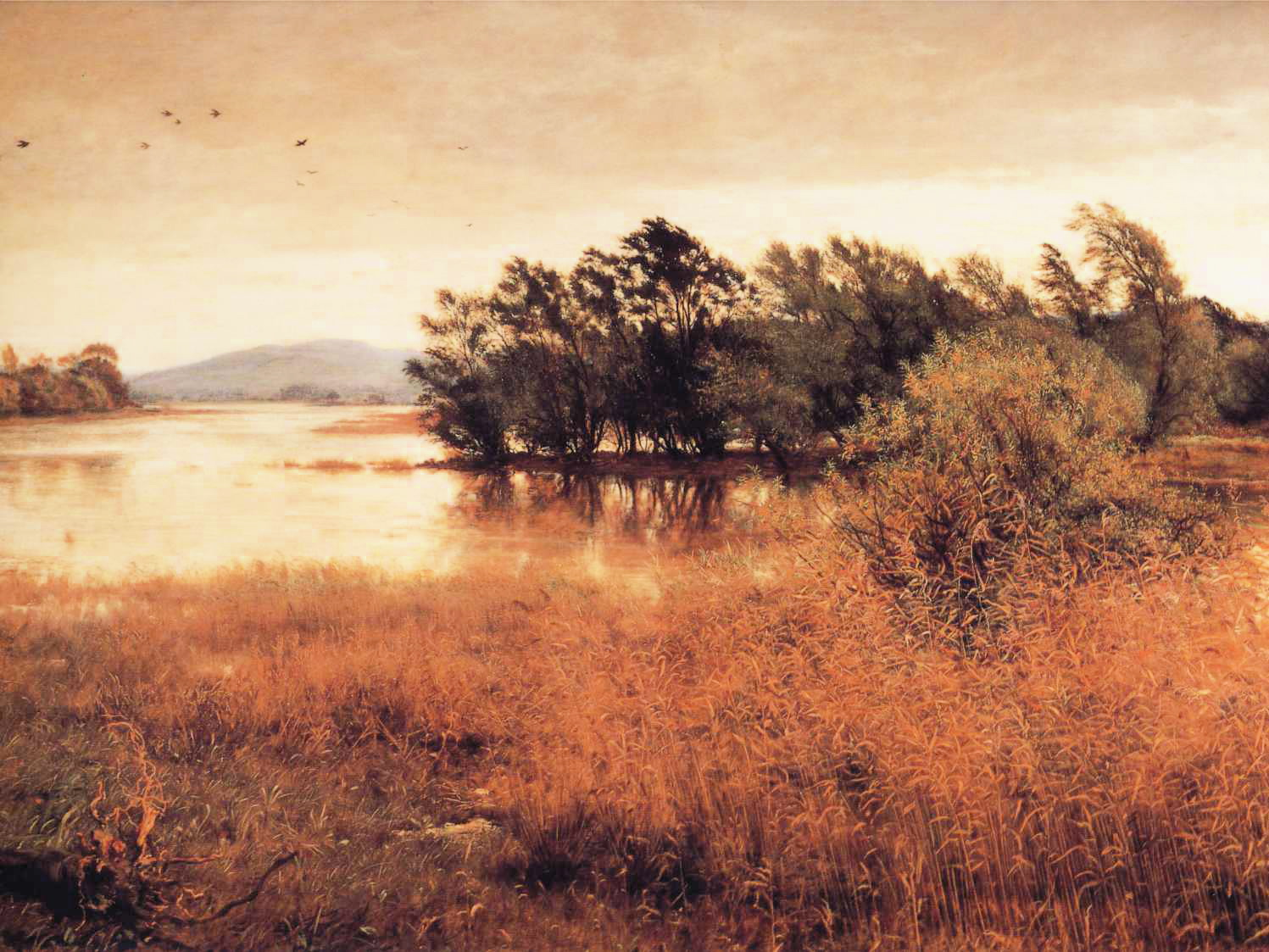
- Artist: John Everett Millais
- Year: 1870
- Medium: Oil on canvas
- Dimensions: 141.0 cm × 186.7 cm (55.5 in × 73.5 in)
- Location: Andrew Lloyd Webber Collection

Chill October is an 1870 oil painting by John Everett Millais which depicts a Scottish landscape in autumn. The painting measures 141.0 cm × 186.7 cm (55.5 in × 73.5 in). It was the first large-scale Scottish landscape painted by Millais.

== The painting ==
The work was painted en plein air, near the railway line from Perth to Dundee, close to the family home of Millais' wife Effie Gray at Bowerswell House in Perth. Millais first noticed the scene when passing by train, and returned to paint it. The right foreground is dominated by long grasses, with the landscape stretching out to the left past a river bank with wind-blown willows and reeds to a distant hill beside the Firth of Tay. The scene is dominated by muted greens, yellows and browns of autumn, under a sombre grey sky.

In the winter of 1898 an exhibition was held at the Royal Academy, a retrospective of Millais' work. The accompanying catalogue notes that a piece of paper with a note by Millais was pasted to the stretcher at the back of the painting, reading as follows:

"Chill October" was painted from a backwater of the Tay just below Kinfauns near Perth. The scene, simple as it is, had impressed me for years before I painted it. The traveller between Perth and Dundee passes the spot where I stood. Danger on either side—the tide which once carried away my platform, and the trains which threatened to blow my work into the river. I chose the subject for the sentiment it always conveyed to my mind, and I am happy to think that the transcript touched the public in a like manner, although many of my friends at the time were at a loss to understand what I saw to paint in such a scene. I made no sketch for it, but painted every touch from Nature, on the canvas itself, under irritating trials of wind and rain. The only studio work was in connexion with the effect. John Everett Millais. 18th May/82.

== Exhibition and owners ==
It was exhibited at the Royal Academy in 1871, and won a prize at the Paris Exposition Universelle in 1878. It was bought in 1871 for £1,000 by Samuel Mendel for his house at Manley Hall. It was sold at auction in 1875 for 3,100 guineas (£3,255) and acquired by William Armstrong for his house, Cragside. The Magazine of Art, vol.14 in 1891 described Chill October in the Armstrong collection as "the most famous landscape in the collection ... the first and noblest of his great landscapes. It would be superfluous to describe in detail a picture which is known intimately by every British lover of art."

It was sold by Armstrong's heirs in 1910 for 4,800 guineas (£5,040), and remained in the same family for three generations until it was bought by Andrew Lloyd Webber in 1991 for £370,000.

== See also ==
- Millais' Autumn Leaves, 1855–56
- List of paintings by John Everett Millais
