= St Clement's Church, Chorlton-cum-Hardy =

St Clement's Church
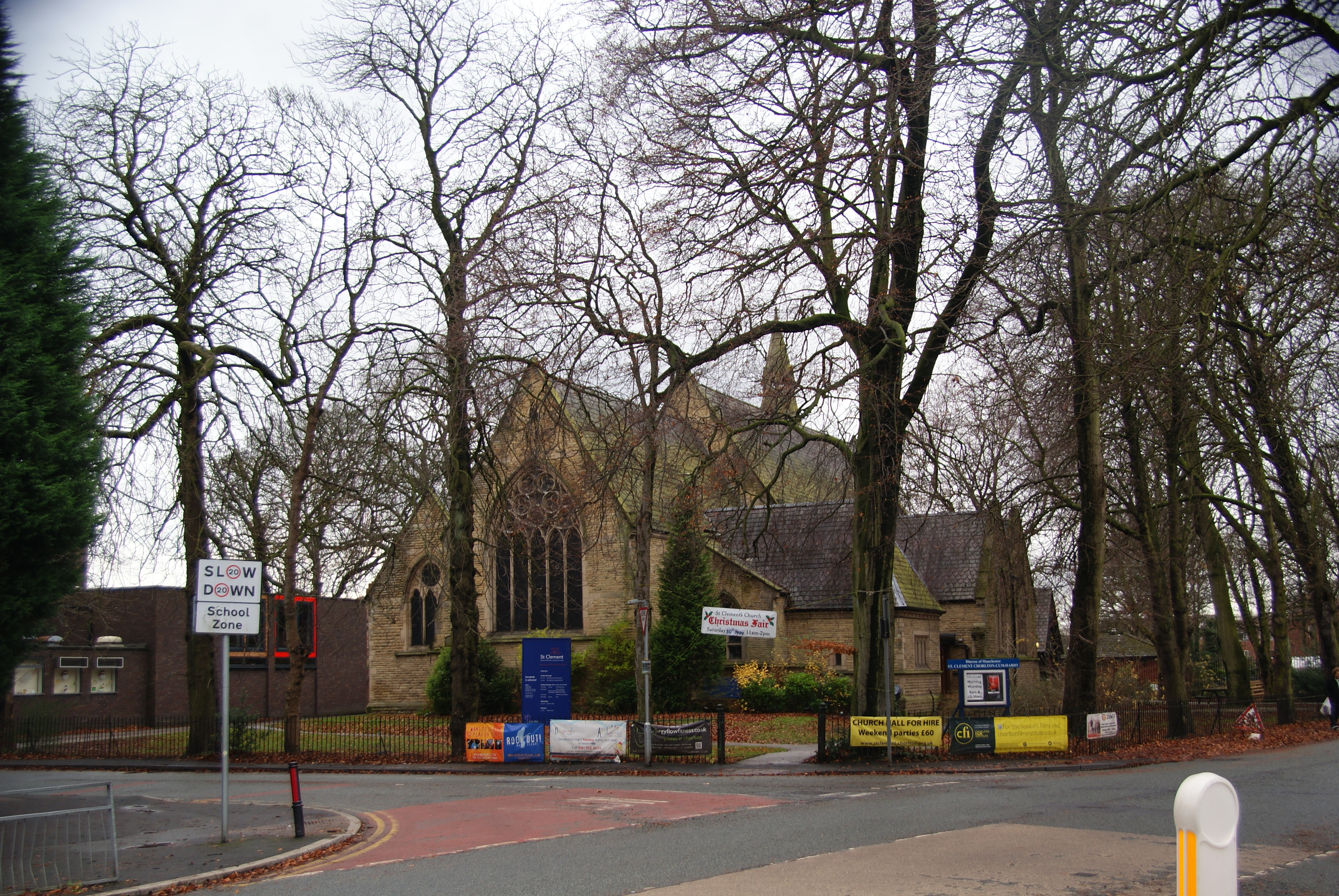
- St Clement's Church, Chorlton-cum-Hardy
- St Clement's Church
- 53.44069°N 2.28368°W
- OS grid reference: SJ 81253 93804
- Location: Chorlton-cum-Hardy, Manchester
- Country: England
- Denomination: Anglican

History
- Status: Parish church
- Founded: 1866
- Dedication: Saint Clement
- Consecrated: 1896

Architecture
- Functional status: Active
- Architect(s): Pennington & Bridgen
- Architectural type: Decorated Gothic

Administration
- Diocese: Manchester
- Deanery: Hulme

St Clement's Church is an active Anglican parish church in Chorlton-cum-Hardy, Manchester, England. Its daughter church, St Barnabas (opened 1951), serves the Barlow Moor estate and south Chorlton. St Clement's is in the Hulme deanery in the diocese of Manchester.

== History ==
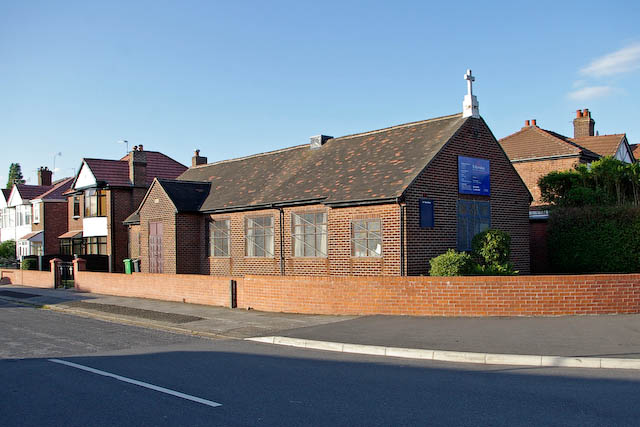
The church of St Barnabas, Chorlton

Chorlton's first church was south of Chorlton Green. The chapel, dedicated to St Clement, was established early in the 16th century, probably in 1512, as a chapel of ease to the Church of St James, Didsbury in the huge ecclesiastical parish of Manchester in the Diocese of Lichfield. The chapel was replaced by another brick-built chapel in 1779. For about 35 years it was Roman Catholic, until the separation from Rome under King Henry VIII.

By 1860 there was a need for a larger church and the new St Clement's Church on Edge Lane opened in 1866, although it was not consecrated until 1896. Sir William Cunliffe Brooks, a benefactor to the township, did not support building the new church. Two of his daughters who died in infancy were buried at the old church. Another wealthy and influential parishioner who opposed the move was the merchant, Samuel Mendel of Manley Hall, Whalley Range. The situation continued until 1940, when the endowment was formally transferred to the new church. The old church was demolished in 1949 it having become dilapidated. Its ground plan is still apparent and its site was excavated in 1980–81. At Hurstville Road, Hardy Lane, is St Barnabas's Church, a chapel dependent upon St Clement's. It opened in 1951. St Clement's celebrated its 500th anniversary during 2012. David Bonser, the Anglican Bishop of Bolton from 1991 until 1999, was rector of St Clement's from 1968 to 1972.

Among the clergy who ministered here were Joshua Brookes, curate from 1782 to 1791, and Peter Hordern (died 1836) who was librarian of Chetham's Library. John Edmund Booth was rector from 1859 until his death in 1892; during which time a new church was built and the school building was replaced by a larger one.

In 1898 the parish was divided. St Werburgh's Church was consecrated in 1902 on land taken from the eastern part of St Clement's parish to serve that area and Whalley Range.

=== Churchyard ===
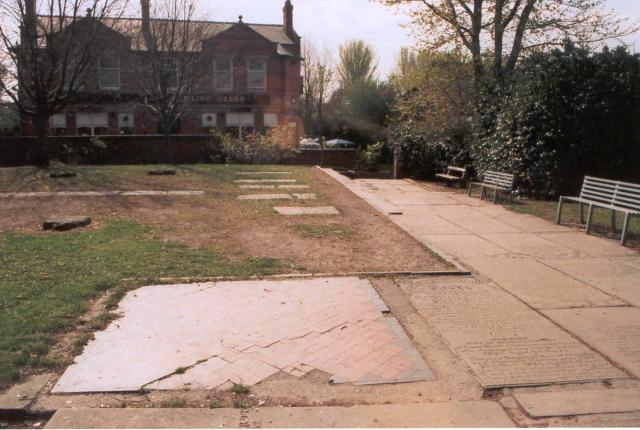
The old St Clement's churchyard, the site of the former church on the left

The old St Clement's churchyard is next to the Bowling Green Hotel although interments ceased in 1882 except for spaces in existing graves. It was in use for about 160 years. The extant burial registers begin in 1753 and end in 1916 although the Rev John Edmund Booth said there was a gravestone dated 1660. By 1881 re-burials caused a scandal which was resolved by the appointment of a Home Office inspector in November of that year. He recommended an order be made to close the burial ground to new interments, save for certain exceptions. The order was made in 1882. In 1930 bodies remaining in the churchyard were exhumed and buried in Southern Cemetery, Manchester. By the 1980s, when the site of the church was excavated and the churchyard landscaped, the churchyard contained 380 gravestones some of which were used to make a path and others were left in place. Two clergymen who ministered in Chorlton, John Morton and John Edmund Booth, were buried in the churchyard and their gravestones are extant.

== Architecture ==
The architects for the new St Clement's Church were Pennington & Bridgen who used the Decorated Gothic style; building work began in 1860 and the roof was added in 1866 but the church was not consecrated until 1896. Three additions made by the architect W. Higginbottom are the north transept in 1883, the Lady Chapel in 1895 and the south transept in 1896. Features of interest are the octagonal southwest turret and the stained glass of the east window.

== See also ==
- Listed buildings in Manchester-M21
