= Cragside =

Country house in Northumberland, England

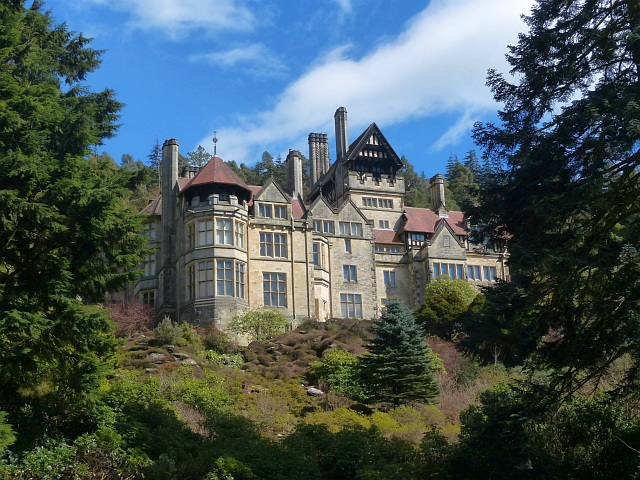
- "Truly the palace of a modern magician" – the Victorian periodical The World describes Armstrong and his house

- Location within Northumberland
- 55.3136°N 1.8853°W
- Type: House
- Location: Rothbury, Northumberland, England

History
- Built: 1869–1895
- Built for: William Armstrong, Baron Armstrong of Cragside

Site notes
- Architect: Richard Norman Shaw
- Architectural style: Tudor Revival
- Governing body: National Trust

Listed Building – Grade I
- Official name: Cragside
- Designated: 21 October 1953
- Reference no.: 1042076

Listed Building – Grade II*
- Official name: Iron Bridge Across the Debdon
- Designated: 25 August 1987
- Reference no.: 1042033

Listed Building – Grade II*
- Official name: Clock Tower 110 Metres North East of Cragside Park House
- Designated: 22 December 1981
- Reference no.: 1354750

National Register of Historic Parks and Gardens
- Official name: Cragside park and gardens
- Designated: 1 January 1985
- Reference no.: 1001046
- Grade: I

Cragside is a Tudor Revival country house near the town of Rothbury in Northumberland, England. Dating to the Victorian era, it was the home of William Armstrong, 1st Baron Armstrong, founder of the Armstrong Whitworth armaments firm. An industrial magnate, scientist, philanthropist and inventor of the hydraulic crane and the Armstrong gun, Armstrong also displayed his inventiveness in the domestic sphere, making Cragside the first house in the world to be lit using hydroelectric power. The estate was technologically advanced: the architect of the house, Richard Norman Shaw, wrote that it was equipped with "wonderful hydraulic machines that do all sorts of things". In the grounds, Armstrong built dams and lakes to power a sawmill, a water-powered laundry, early versions of a dishwasher and a dumb waiter, a hydraulic lift and a hydroelectric rotisserie. In 1887, Armstrong was raised to the peerage, the first engineer or scientist to be ennobled, and became Baron Armstrong of Cragside.

The original building consisted of a small shooting lodge which Armstrong built between 1862 and 1864. In 1869, he employed the architect Richard Norman Shaw to enlarge the site, and in two phases of work between 1869 and 1882, they transformed the house into a northern Neuschwanstein. The result was described by the architect and writer Harry Stuart Goodhart-Rendel as "one of the most dramatic compositions in all architecture". Armstrong filled the house with a significant art collection; he and his wife were patrons of many 19th-century British artists. Cragside became an integral part of Armstrong's commercial operations: honoured guests under Armstrong's roof, including the Shah of Persia, the King of Siam and two future Prime Ministers of Japan, were also customers for his commercial undertakings.

Following Armstrong's death in 1900, his heirs struggled to maintain the house and estate. In 1910, the best of Armstrong's art collection was sold off, and by the 1970s, in an attempt to meet inheritance tax, plans were submitted for large-scale residential development of the estate. In 1971 the National Trust asked the architectural historian Mark Girouard to compile a gazetteer of the most important Victorian houses in Britain which the Trust should seek to save should they ever be sold. Girouard placed Cragside at the top of the list; in 1977, the house was acquired by the Trust with the aid of a grant from the National Land Fund. A Grade I listed building since 1953, Cragside has been open to the public since 1979.

== History ==
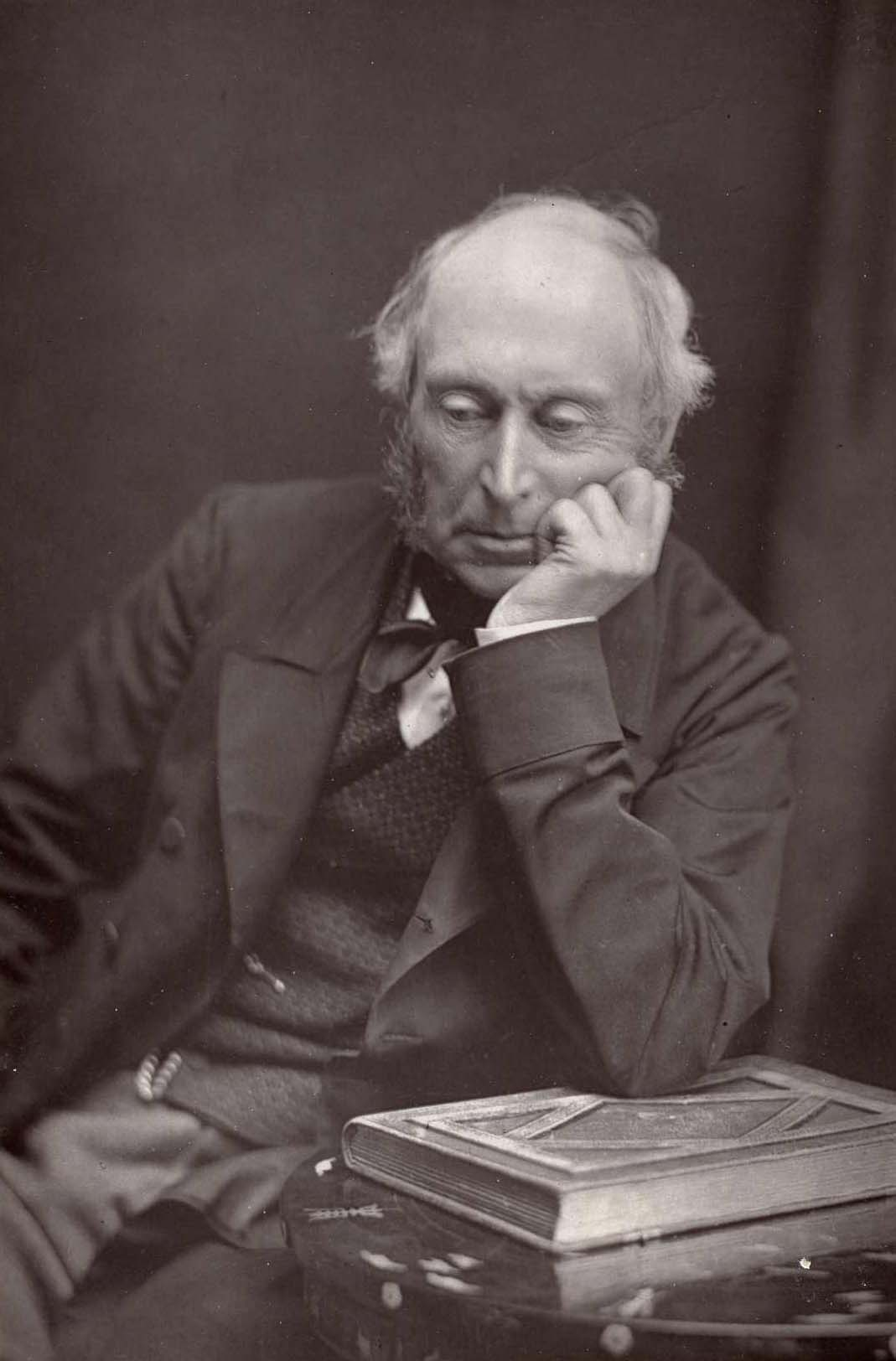
Armstrong in the 1870s

=== William Armstrong ===
William Armstrong was born on 26 November 1810 in Newcastle upon Tyne, the son of a corn merchant. Trained as a solicitor, he moved to London before he was twenty. Returning to Newcastle, in 1835 he met and married Margaret Ramshaw, the daughter of a builder. A keen amateur scientist, Armstrong began to conduct experiments in both hydraulics and electricity. In 1847, he abandoned the law for manufacturing and established W. G. Armstrong and Company at a site at Elswick, outside Newcastle. By the 1850s, with his design for the Armstrong Gun, Armstrong laid the foundations for an armaments firm that would, before the end of the century, see Krupp as its only world rival. He established himself as a figure of national standing: his work supplying artillery to the British Army was seen as an important response to the failures of Britain's forces during the Crimean War. In 1859, he was knighted and made Engineer of Rifled Ordnance, becoming the principal supplier of armaments to both the Army and the Royal Navy. (Note: Britain's military deficiencies had been exposed in the Crimean War. At the time, Britain, in common with other European powers, had a nationalised gun-making industry. Armstrong's appointment as Engineer of Rifled Ordnance saw the almost complete transfer of responsibility for production to his private Elswick Ordnance Company and the development of the first breech-loading gun. Commercial rivalries and governmental in-fighting saw the cancellation of all of Armstrong's contracts in 1862, and in 1863 he resigned his post, merging the EOC with his other engineering concerns to form Sir W G Armstrong and Co.)

=== Shooting box: 1862–1865 ===
Armstrong had spent much of his childhood at Rothbury, escaping from industrial Newcastle for the benefit of his often poor health. He returned to the area in 1862, not having taken a holiday for over fifteen years. On a walk with friends, Armstrong was struck by the attractiveness of the site for a house. Returning to Newcastle, he bought a small parcel of land and decided to build a modest house on the side of a moorland crag. He intended a house of eight or ten rooms and a stable for a pair of horses. The house was completed in the mid-1860s by an unknown architect: a two-storey shooting box of little architectural distinction, it was nevertheless constructed and furnished to a high standard.

=== Fairy palace: 1869–1900 ===
Armstrong's architect for Cragside's expansion was the Scot R. Norman Shaw. Shaw had begun his career in the office of William Burn and had later studied under Anthony Salvin and George Edmund Street. Salvin had taught him the mastery of internal planning which was essential for the design of the large and highly variegated houses which the Victorian wealthy craved. Salvin and Street had taught him to understand the Gothic Revival. At only 24, he won the RIBA Gold Medal and Travelling Studentship. The connection between Armstrong and Shaw was made when Armstrong purchased a picture, Prince Hal taking the crown from his father's bedside by John Callcott Horsley, which proved too large to fit into his town house in Jesmond, Newcastle. Horsley was a friend of both, and recommended that Shaw design an extension to the banqueting hall Armstrong had previously built in the grounds. When this was completed in 1869, Shaw was asked for enlargements and improvements to the shooting lodge Armstrong had had built at Rothbury four years earlier. This was the genesis of the transformation of the house between 1869 and 1884. Over the next thirty years, Cragside became the centre of Armstrong's world; reminiscing years later, in his old age, he remarked, "had there been no Cragside, I shouldn't be talking to you today – for it has been my very life".

The architectural historian Andrew Saint records that Shaw sketched out the whole design for the "future fairy palace" in a single afternoon, while Armstrong and his guests were out on a shooting party. After this rapid initial design, Shaw worked on building the house for over 20 years. The long building period, and Armstrong's piecemeal, and changeable, approach to the development of the house, and his desire to retain the original shooting lodge at its core, occasionally led to tensions between client and architect, and to a building that lacks an overall unity. Armstrong changed the purpose of several rooms as his interests developed, and the German architectural historian Hermann Muthesius, writing just after Armstrong's death in 1900, noted that "the house did not find the unqualified favour with Shaw's followers that his previous works had done, nor did it entirely satisfy (Shaw)". Nevertheless, Shaw's abilities, as an architect and as a manager of difficult clients, ensured that Cragside was composed "with memorable force".

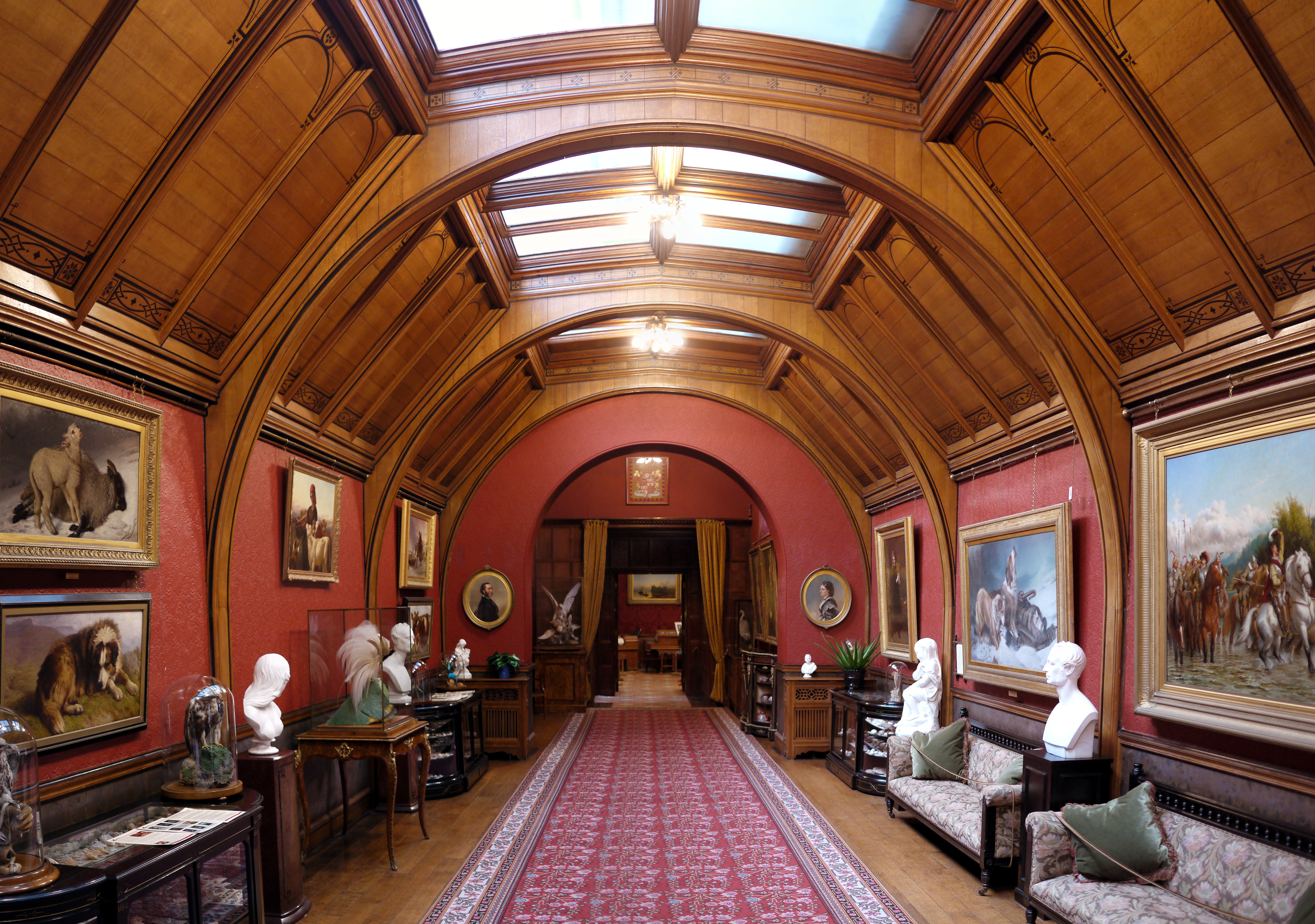
The top-lit Gallery, formerly Armstrong's museum

As well as being Armstrong's home, Cragside acted as an enormous display case for his ever-expanding art collection. The best of his pictures were hung in the drawing room, but Shaw also converted the museum into a top-lit picture gallery. Pride of place was given to John Everett Millais's Chill October, bought by Armstrong at the Samuel Mendel sale at Christie's in 1875. Armstrong also bought Millais' Jephthah's Daughter at the Mendel sale. Both were sold in the 1910 sale; Chill October is now in the private collection of Andrew Lloyd Webber, and Jephthah's Daughter is held by the National Museum Cardiff. (Note: There are conflicting views as to the price Armstrong paid for the paintings. His 2012 biographer Henrietta Heald quotes Armstrong in a letter to his wife: "I have bought Chill October and Jephthah for 900 guineas – a big price but much less than they were expected to bring". Hugh Dixon, in the 2007 guidebook to Cragside, records that Armstrong paid 3,800 guineas for Jephthah's Daughter alone, "one of (his) most expensive purchases". The art historian Gerald Reitlinger gives the following prices in his definitive guide: Chill October, £3,255 and Jephthah's Daughter, £3,990 (that is, 3,100 guineas and 3,800 guineas respectively). Their relative values had changed substantially by 1910: Chill October realised £5,040 but Jephthah only £1,260 (4,800 and 1,200 guineas).)

Cragside was an important setting for Armstrong's commercial activities. The architectural writer Simon Jenkins records: "Japanese, Persian, Siamese and German dignitaries paid court to the man who equipped their armies and built their navies". In his 2005 book Landmarks of Britain, Clive Aslet notes visits with the same purpose from the Crown Prince of Afghanistan and the Shah of Persia. The Shah Naser al-Din visited in July 1889, and the Afghan prince Nasrullah Khan in June 1895. Armstrong's biographer Henrietta Heald mentions two future prime ministers of Japan, Katō Takaaki and Saitō Makoto, among a steady stream of Japanese industrialists, naval officers, politicians and royalty who inscribed their names in the Cragside visitors' book. The Chinese diplomat Li Hung Chang visited in August 1896. King Chulalongkorn of Siam was staying in August 1897, when activity at the Elswick Works was disrupted by a bitter strike over pay and hours.

In August 1884 the Prince and Princess of Wales (the future Edward VII and Queen Alexandra) made a three-day visit to Cragside; it was the peak of Armstrong's social career. The royal arrival at the house was illuminated by ten thousand lamps and a vast array of Chinese lanterns hung in the trees on the estate; fireworks were launched from six balloons, and a great bonfire was lit on the Simonside Hills. On the second day of their visit, the Prince and Princess travelled to Newcastle, to formally open the grounds of Armstrong's old house, Jesmond Dean, which he had by then donated to the city as a public park. It is still a public park today, a ravine known as Jesmond Dene. Three years later, at the Golden Jubilee of Queen Victoria, Armstrong was ennobled as Baron Armstrong of Cragside, and became the first engineer and the first scientist to be granted a peerage. (Note: Others have claimed the honour of the first scientific peerage for the physicist Lord Kelvin whose barony, awarded in 1892, was granted entirely in recognition of his scientific achievements.) Among many other celebrations, he was awarded the freedom of the City of Newcastle. In his vote of thanks, the mayor noted that one in four of the entire population of the city was employed directly by Armstrong, or by companies over which he presided.

=== Armstrong's heirs: 1900–present ===
Armstrong died at Cragside on 27 December 1900, aged 90, and was buried beside his wife in the churchyard at Rothbury. His gravestone carries an epitaph: His scientific attainments gained him a world wide celebrity and his great philanthropy the gratitude of the poor. Cragside, and Armstrong's fortune, were inherited by his great-nephew, William Watson-Armstrong. Watson-Armstrong lacked Armstrong's commercial acumen and a series of poor financial investments led to the sale of much of the great art collection in 1910. In 1972, the death of Watson-Armstrong's heir, William John Montagu Watson-Armstrong, saw the house and estate threatened by large-scale residential development, intended to raise the money to pay a large inheritance tax bill. In 1971, when advising the National Trust on the most important Victorian houses to be preserved for the nation in the event of their sale, Mark Girouard had identified Cragside as the top priority. A major campaign saw the house and grounds acquired by the Trust in 1977, with the aid of a grant from the National Land Fund.

In 2007, Cragside reopened after undergoing an 18-month refurbishment programme that included rewiring the whole house. It has become one of the most-visited sites in North East England, with some 255,005 visitors in 2019. The Trust continues restoration work, allowing more of the house to be displayed: Armstrong's electrical room, in which he conducted experiments on electrical charges towards the end of his life, was re-opened in 2016. The experiments had led to the publication in 1897 of Armstrong's last work, Electrical Movement in Air and Water, illustrated with remarkable early photographs by his friend John Worsnop.

The Trust continues the reconstruction of the wider estate, with plans to redevelop Armstrong's glasshouses, including the palm house, the ferneries and the orchid house.

== Architecture and description ==
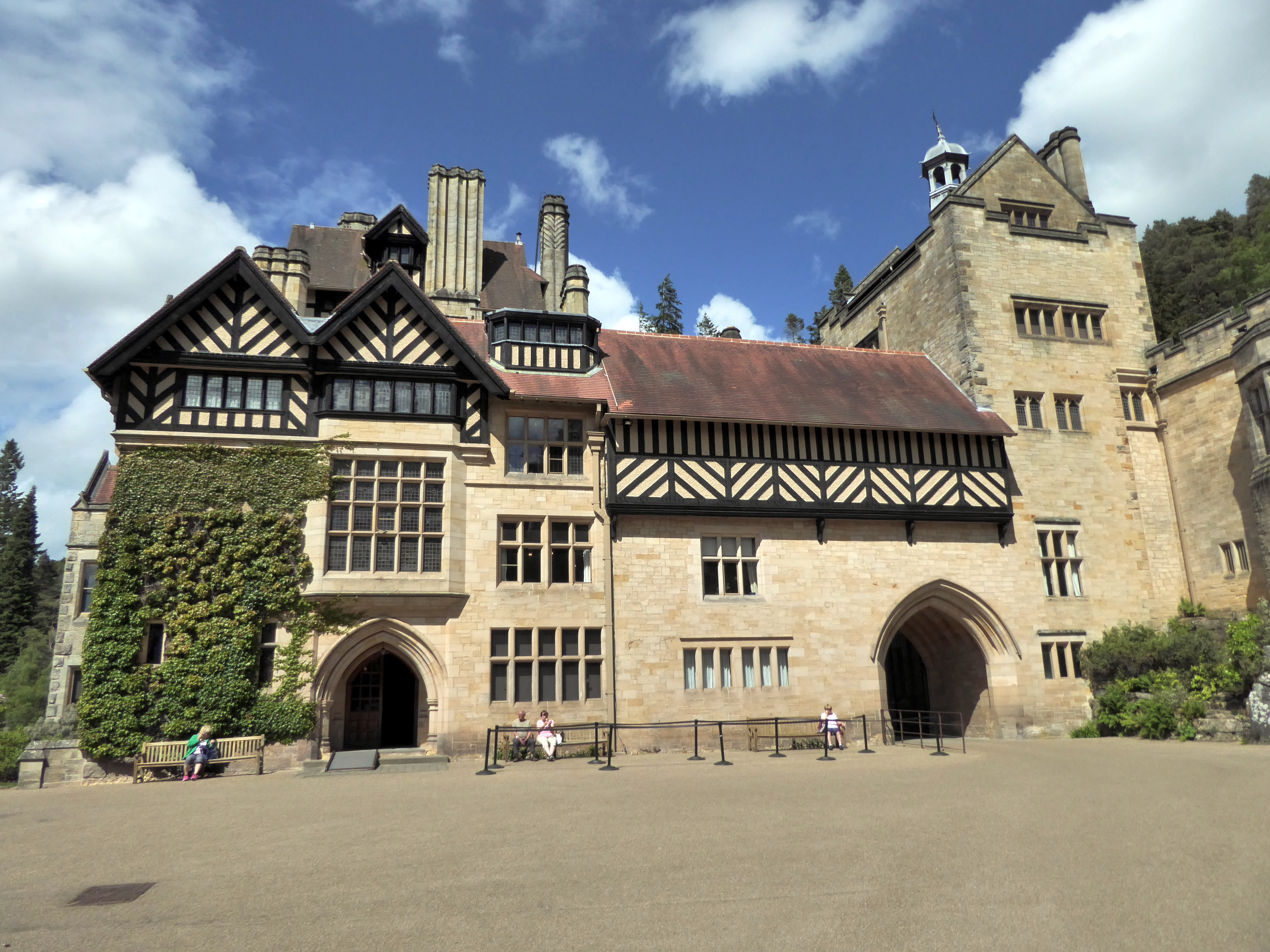
The entrance front – Shaw's "Wagnerian" overture

Cragside is an example of Shaw's Tudor revival style; the Pevsner Architectural Guide for Northumberland called it "the most dramatic Victorian mansion in the North of England". The entrance front was described by Harry Stuart Goodhart-Rendel as "one of the most dramatic compositions in all architecture", and the architectural historian James Stevens Curl regarded the house as "an extraordinarily accomplished Picturesque composition". Criticism focuses on the building's lack of overall coherence; in The National Trust Book of the English House, Aslet and Powers describe the house as "large and meandering", and the architectural critics Dixon and Muthesius write that "the plan rambles along the hillside". Saint is even more dismissive: for him, "the plan of Cragside is little better than a straggle". The half-timbering above the entrance has also been criticised as unfaithful to the vernacular tradition of the North-East. Shaw would have been unconcerned; desiring it for "romantic effect, he reached out for it like an artist reaching out for a tube of colour".

The architectural historian J. Mordaunt Crook considers Cragside to be one of the very few country houses built by the Victorian commercial plutocracy that was truly "avant-garde or trend-setting". In his study, The Rise of the Nouveaux Riches, Crook contends that many new-monied owners were too domineering, and generally chose second-rate architects, as these tended to be more "pliant", allowing the clients to get their own way, rather than those of the first rank such as Shaw. The Rhenish flavour of the house makes a notable contrast with a country house that was almost contemporaneous with Cragside: the Villa Hügel constructed by Armstrong's greatest rival, Alfred Krupp. While Armstrong's Northumbrian fastness drew on Teutonic inspirations, his German competitor designed and built a house that was an exercise in neoclassicism.

The location for the house was described by Mark Girouard as "a lunatic site". Pevsner and Richmond call both the setting and the house Wagnerian. The ledge on which it stands is narrow, and space for the repeated expansions could only be found by dynamiting the rock face behind, or by building upwards. Such challenges only drove Armstrong on, and overcoming the technical barriers to construction gave him great pleasure. His task was made easier by the use of the workforce and the technology of the Elswick Works. The architectural historian Jill Franklin notes that the vertiginous fall of the site is so steep that the drawing room, on a level with the first-floor landing at the front of the house, meets the rock face at the back.

Jenkins describes the plan of the house as "simpler than the exterior suggests". The majority of the reception rooms are located on the ground floor, as are the accompanying service rooms. The exception is the large extension Shaw added to the south-east from 1882. This includes the drawing room, completed for the visit of the Prince and Princess of Wales, in August 1884.

The house has been a Grade I listed building since 21 October 1953, the listing citing inter alia its "largely complete Victorian interior". The architectural correspondent of The Times, Marcus Binney, who was closely involved in the campaign to bring Cragside to the National Trust, noted the historic importance of this "virtually untouched interior", with its collections of furnishings, furniture (much designed especially for Cragside), and fine and decorative arts, with work by many notable designers of the period, including William Morris, Dante Gabriel Rossetti, Philip Webb and Edward Burne-Jones. Pevsner notes that the art collection demonstrated "what was permissible to the Victorian nobleman in the way of erotica".

=== Kitchen and service rooms ===
The kitchen is large by Victorian standards and forms a considerable apartment with the butler's pantry. It displays Armstrong's "technical ingenuity" to the full, having a dumb waiter and a spit both run on hydraulic power. An electric gong announced mealtimes. For the visit of Edward and Alexandra, Armstrong brought in the Royal caterers, Gunters, who used the kitchen to prepare an eight-course menu which included oysters, turtle soup, stuffed turbot, venison, grouse, peaches in maraschino jelly and brown bread ice cream.

=== Victorian Turkish bath ===
Off the kitchen, under the library, Armstrong added a Victorian Turkish bath, as did many wealthy industrialists and members of the landed gentry at that time. (Note: Pevsner (1992 edition) still suggested that this was an unusual item in a Victorian private house. Since then, enough dwellings with Turkish baths have been identified to indicate that this is not the case. The Victorian Turkish baths website identifies over fifty, and also includes illustrated articles on some of them.) Only two such baths are known to remain, though neither is still in use. The other is in Wolverhampton at Wightwick Manor which, like Cragside, belongs to the National Trust. The Cragside bath comprises a hot room (the heated air entering through a grating in the floor), dressing room, cooling-room, drench shower, and a small plunge pool. This is ‘lined with blue and white Delftware tiles in a floral pattern’ with a top border depicting various horsemen. During the construction of the baths, the layout of the rooms was changed from that shown in Shaw's original plan. As was often the case, Armstrong also found practical application for his pleasures: steam generated while warming dry air for the Turkish bath supported the provision of heating for the house.

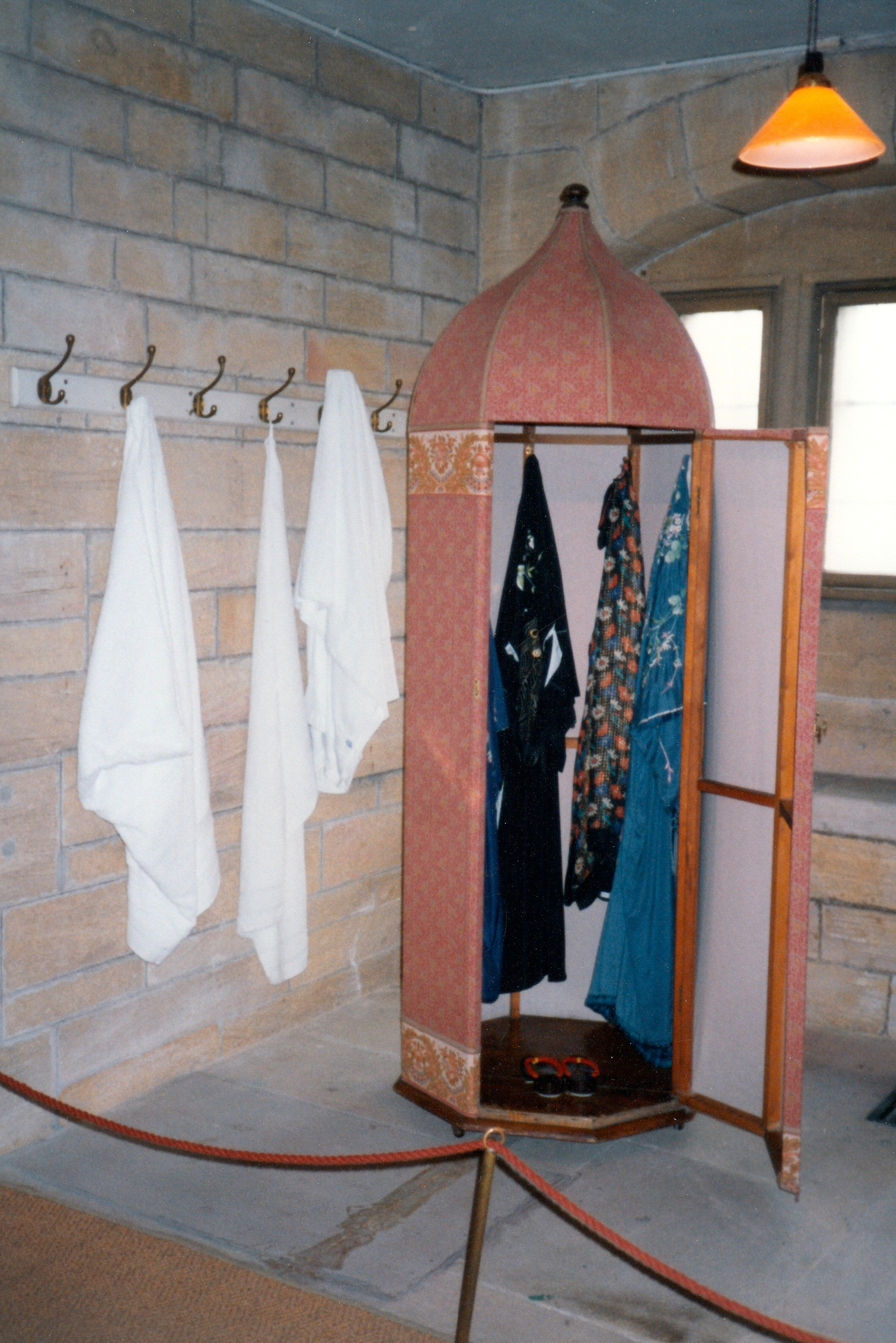
A corner of the dressing room

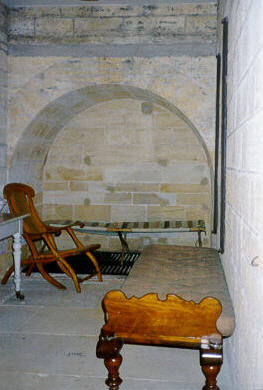
Part of the hot room

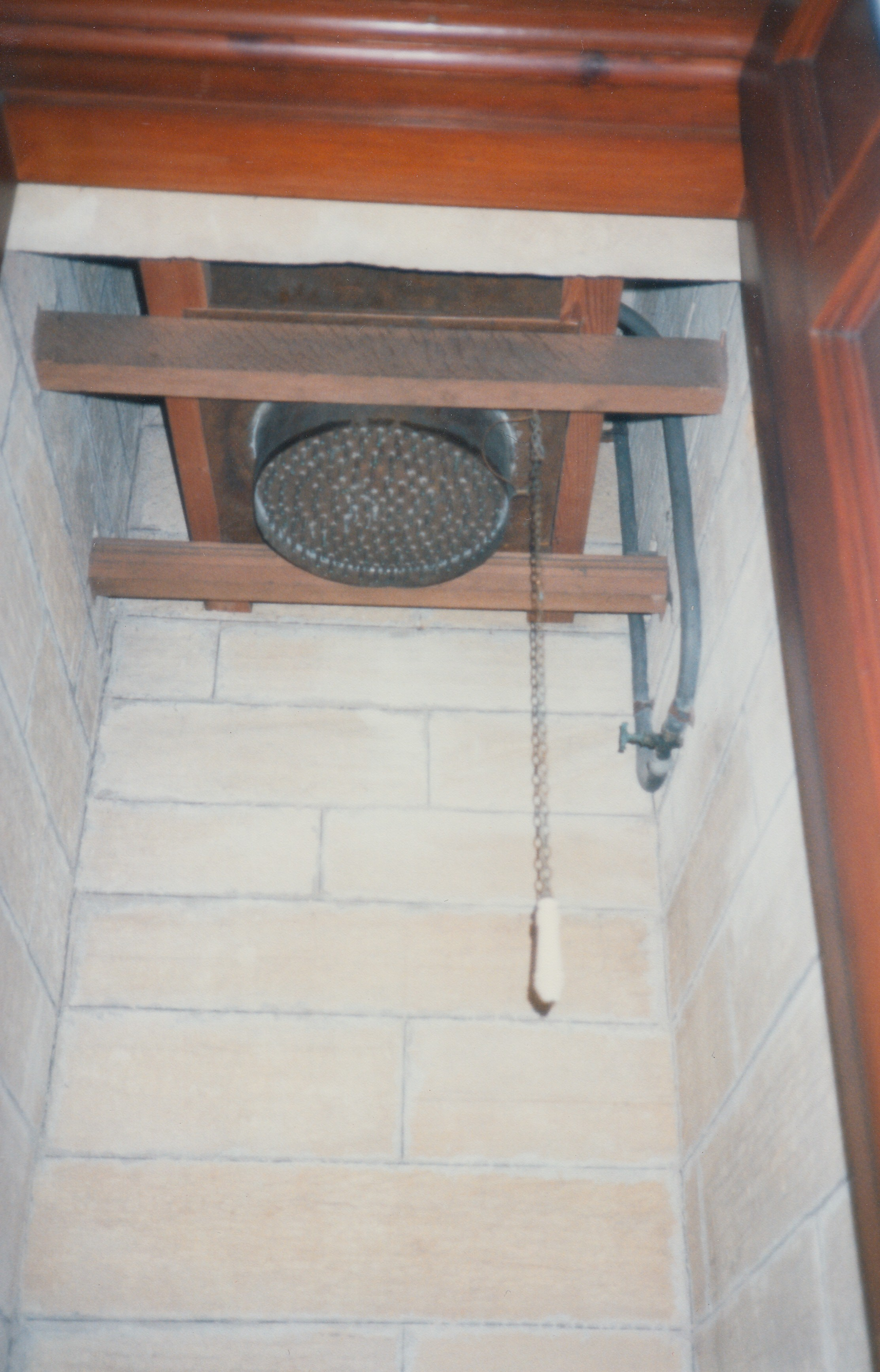
The drench shower

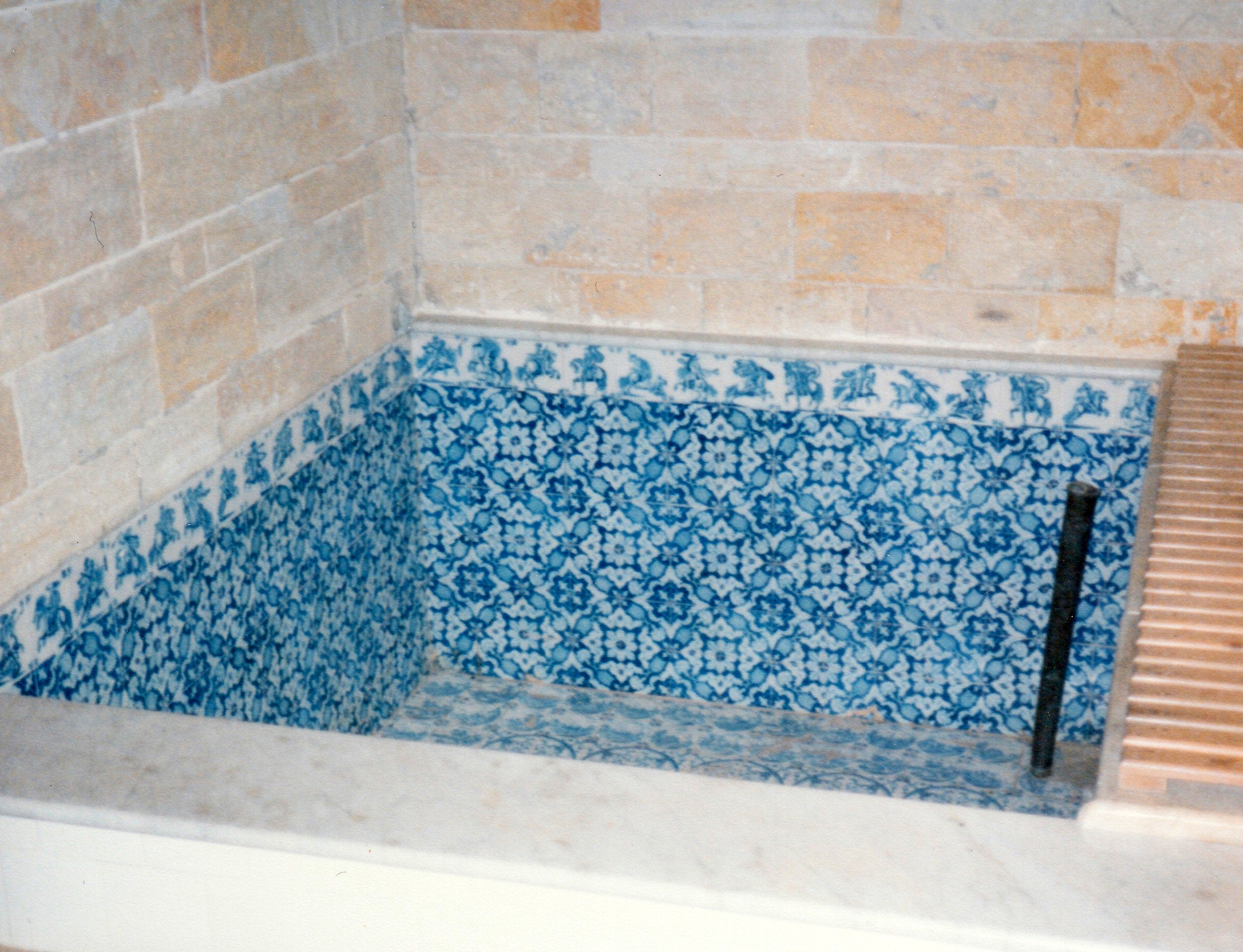
The plunge pool lined with Delftware tiles

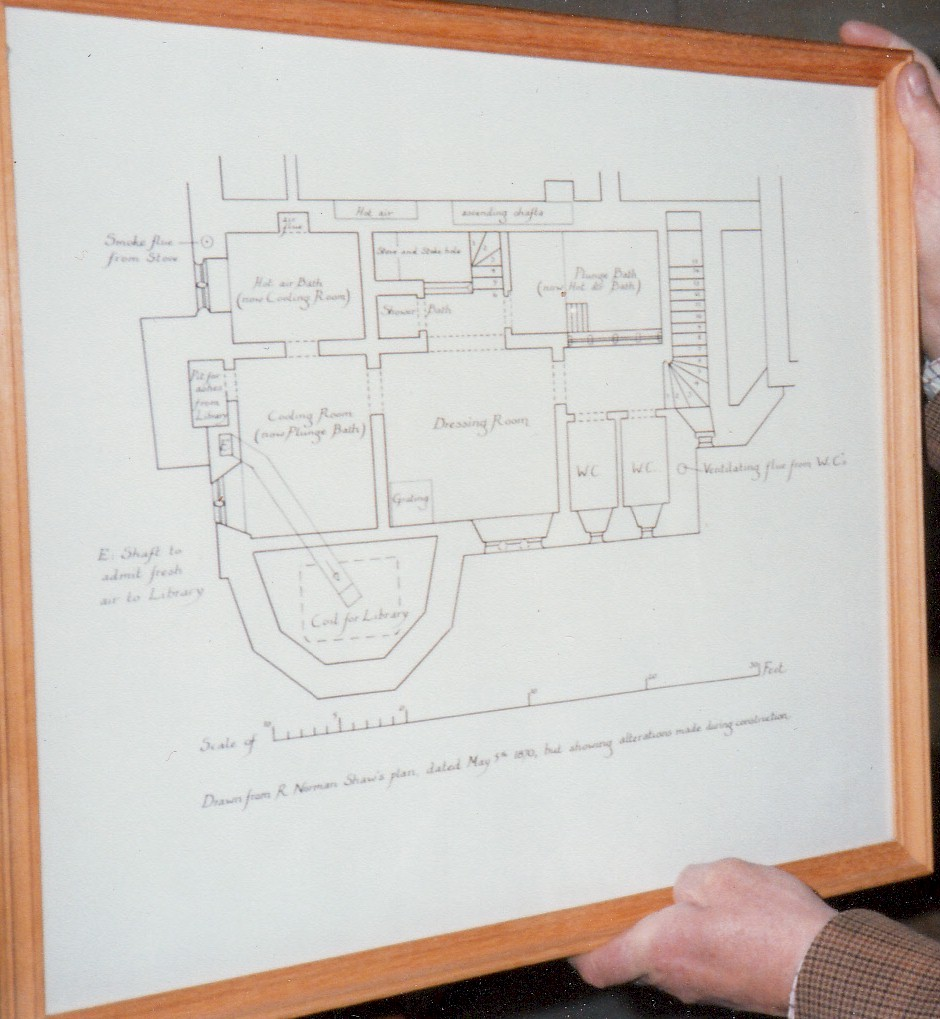
Builder's plan drawn from Shaw's original, showing layout changes

=== Library and dining room ===
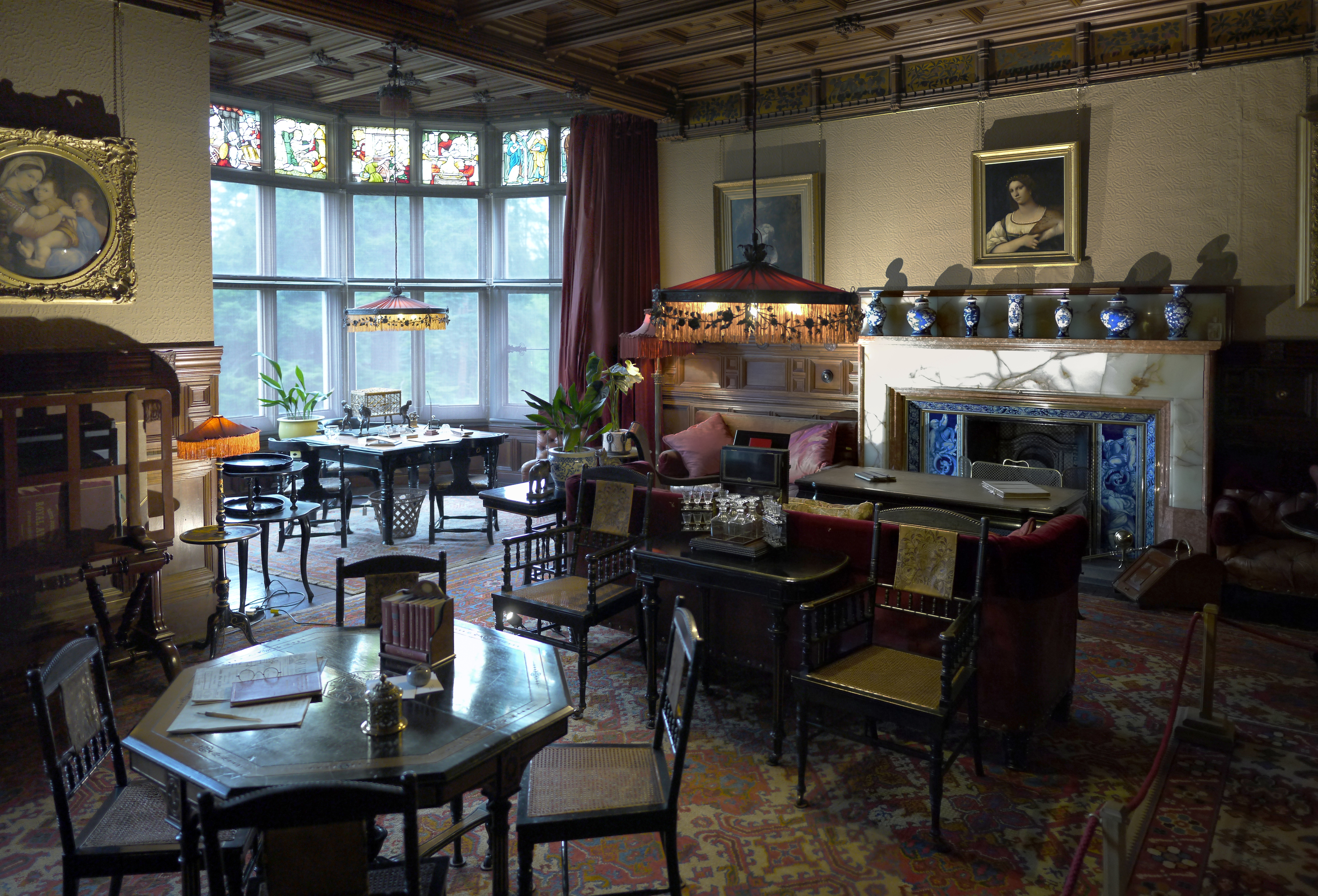
The library – "Shaw's greatest domestic interior"

Girouard describes the library as "one of the most sympathetic Victorian rooms in England". It belongs to the first phase of Shaw's construction work and was completed in 1872. It has a large bay window which gives views out over the bridge and the glen. The room is half-panelled in oak and the fireplace includes fragments of Egyptian onyx, collected during Armstrong's visit to the country in 1872. The library originally contained some of Armstrong's best pictures, although most were rehung in the gallery or drawing room, following Shaw's later building campaign of the 1880s, and then sold in 1910, ten years after Armstrong's death. The highlight was Albert Joseph Moore's Follow My Leader, dating from 1872. Andrew Saint considers the room "Shaw's greatest domestic interior". The dining room off the library contains a "Gothic" fireplace with an inglenook. (Note: Shaw made the construction of inglenooks something of a speciality. He built his first at Cranbrook for John Calcott Horsley, who later introduced Shaw to Armstrong. As well as those at Cragside, two notable examples were created for the now-demolished Dawpool Hall on the Wirral. One of these now forms the porch of The Pantheon at Portmeirion and the other went unsold on eBay in 2012. Shaw's biographer, Andrew Saint writes, "inglenooks are the decorative pièce de résistance of the Shaw country house".)

A portrait of Armstrong by Henry Hetherington Emmerson shows him sitting in the inglenook with his dogs, under a carved inscription on the mantlepiece reading East or West, Hame's Best. The stained glass in the windows of the inglenook is by William Morris, and other glass from Morris & Co., to designs by Rossetti, Burne-Jones, Webb and Ford Madox Brown, was installed in the library, gallery and upper stairs.

=== Owl suite ===
The Owl rooms were constructed in the first building campaign and formed a suite for important guests. Their name derives from the carved owls that decorate the woodwork and the bed. The room is panelled in American Black walnut, the same wood from which the tester bed is carved. Saint notes that Shaw was "proud of the design", displaying a further "owl-bed" in an exhibition in 1877. The Prince and Princess of Wales occupied the rooms during their stay at Cragside in 1884. Other bedrooms, notably the Yellow and White rooms, were hung with wallpaper by William Morris, including early versions of his Fruit and Bird and Trellis designs. The wallpapers were reprinted using the original printing blocks and rehung in the National Trust's renovations.

=== Gallery ===
The gallery originally formed Armstrong's museum room and was built by Shaw between 1872 and 1874. It led to the observatory in the Gilnockie Tower. Later, the room formed a processional route to the newly created drawing room, and was transformed into a gallery for pictures and sculpture. Its lighting displayed further evidence of Armstrong's technical ingenuity. Provided with twelve overhead lamps, the lighting for the room could be supplemented by a further eight lamps, powered by electric current transferred from the lamps in the dining room when they were no longer required. Lighting, and his means of providing it, mattered to Armstrong, on both technical and aesthetic levels; he wrote, "in the passageways and stairs the lamps are used without shades and present a most beautiful and star-like appearance."

=== Drawing room ===
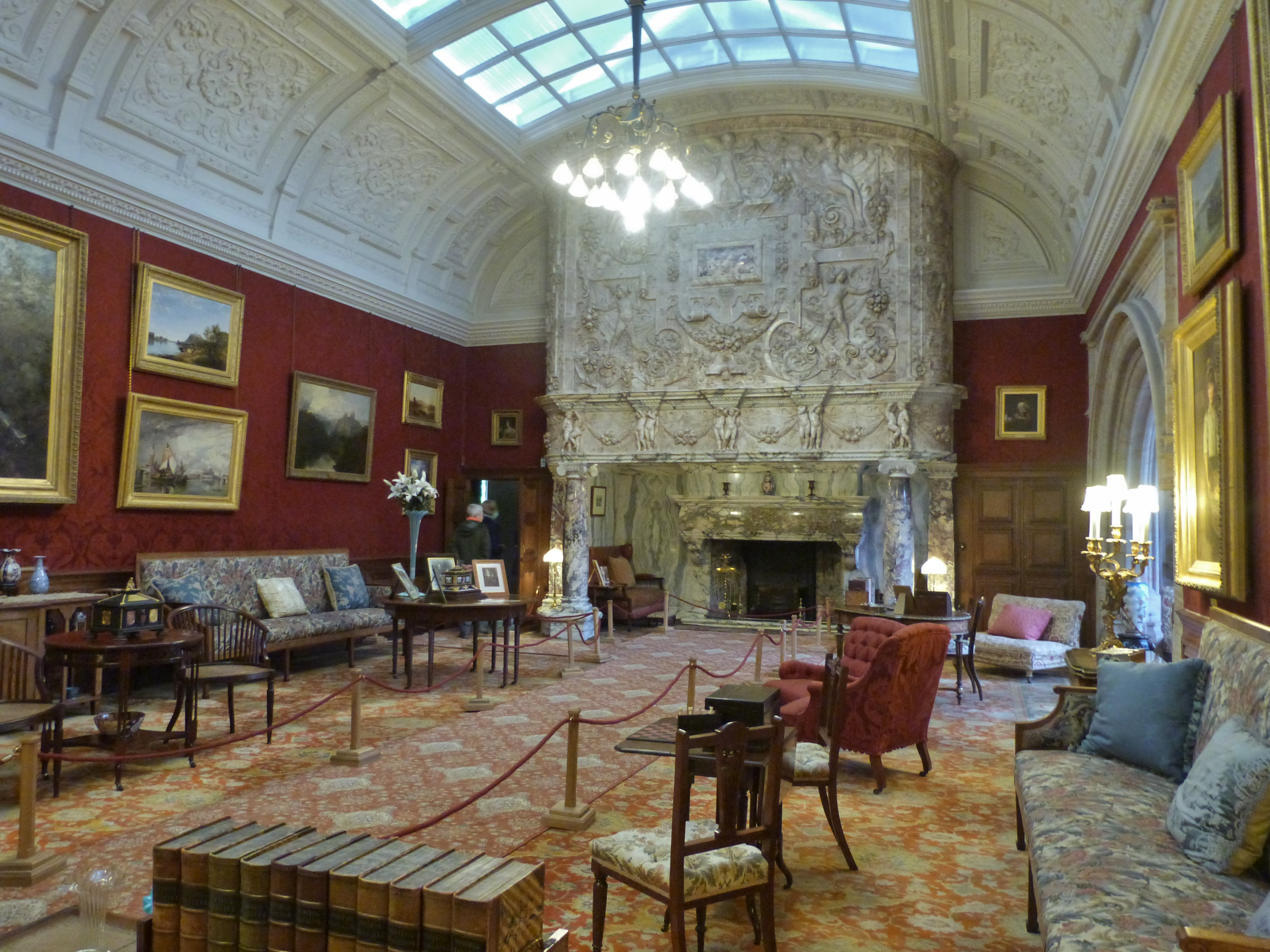
The drawing room and inglenook fireplace – "sensational", "spectacular" or "sickening", according to taste

The drawing room was constructed in the 1880s phase of building, when Armstrong had sold his Jesmond house and was residing solely at Cragside. Aslet suggests that the inspiration for the design was the great hall at Haddon Hall, Derbyshire, although Saint considers Shaw's Dawpool Hall, Cheshire as the more likely source. Pevsner and Richmond mention Hardwick Hall and Hatfield House as possible models for the "spectacular" overall design.

The room contains a colossal marble inglenook chimneypiece, reputed to weigh ten tons, and designed by Shaw's assistant, W. R. Lethaby. Muthesius describes the fireplace as a "splendid example ... with finely composed relief decoration". Jenkins considers it "surely the world's biggest inglenook" and describes the overall impact of the room as "sensational", noting the top-lit ceiling and the elaborate Jacobethan plasterwork. Others have been less complimentary; the writer Reginald Turnor, no admirer either of Shaw or of Victorian architecture and its architects more generally, wrote of the room's "flamboyant and rather sickening detail". By the time of its construction, Shaw, increasingly working for clients of great wealth, had moved on from his "Old English" style, and the room is designed and decorated in a grander and more opulent Renaissance taste. In 2025, a Broadwood piano, originally owned by concert pianist Arabella Goddard, was reinstalled into the drawing room. It made its first appearance in 1875, after Armstrong bought it in an auction for 250 guineas, but then left the house some time after his death.

=== Billiard room ===
The billiard room extension of 1895 is by Frederick Waller. It replaced a laboratory, in which Armstrong conducted experiments in electric currents. The billiard table and furniture were supplied by Burroughes and Watts. The billiard room and adjacent gun room formed a smoking suite, the previous absence of which is evidenced in a watercolour painted to commemorate the visit of the Prince and Princess of Wales. The Prince and Armstrong are shown smoking cigars on the terrace, as Victorian convention did not permit smoking in the principal reception rooms. (Note: Attitudes towards smoking indoors changed significantly in the Victorian period. The architect Robert Kerr, more famous for his textbook on the design of Victorian houses than for his buildings, wrote in 1864, "The pitiable resources to which some gentlemen are driven, even in their own houses, in order to be able to enjoy the pestiferous luxury of a cigar, have given rise to the occasional introduction of an apartment specially dedicated to the use of Tobacco." The historian Jill Franklin noted that "smoking was still completely forbidden in some houses as late as the 1850s", and that only in "more tolerant houses could (gentlemen) use the servants' hall or the harness room of the stables".)

== Technology ==
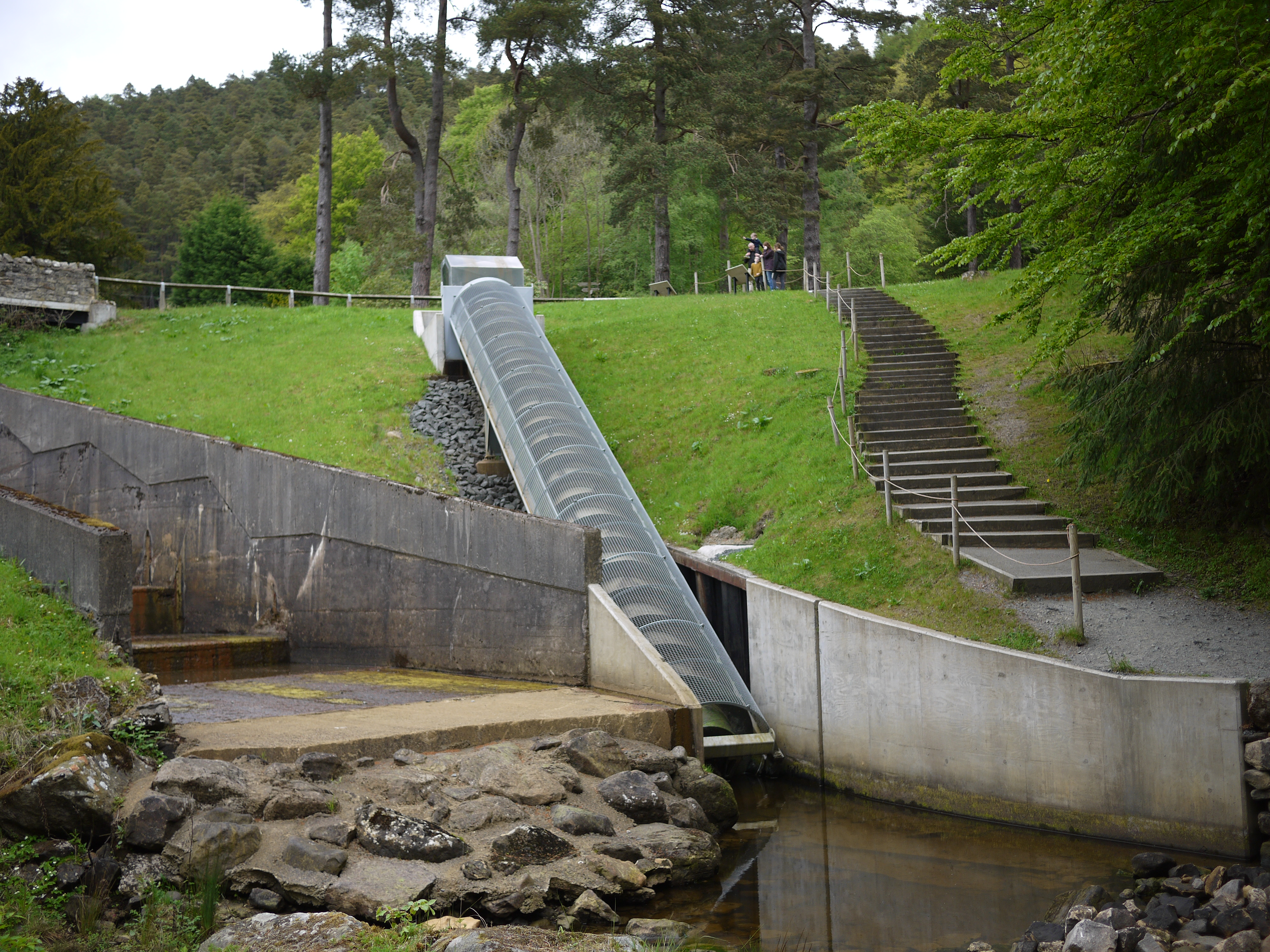
Cragside's screw turbine, installed in 2014

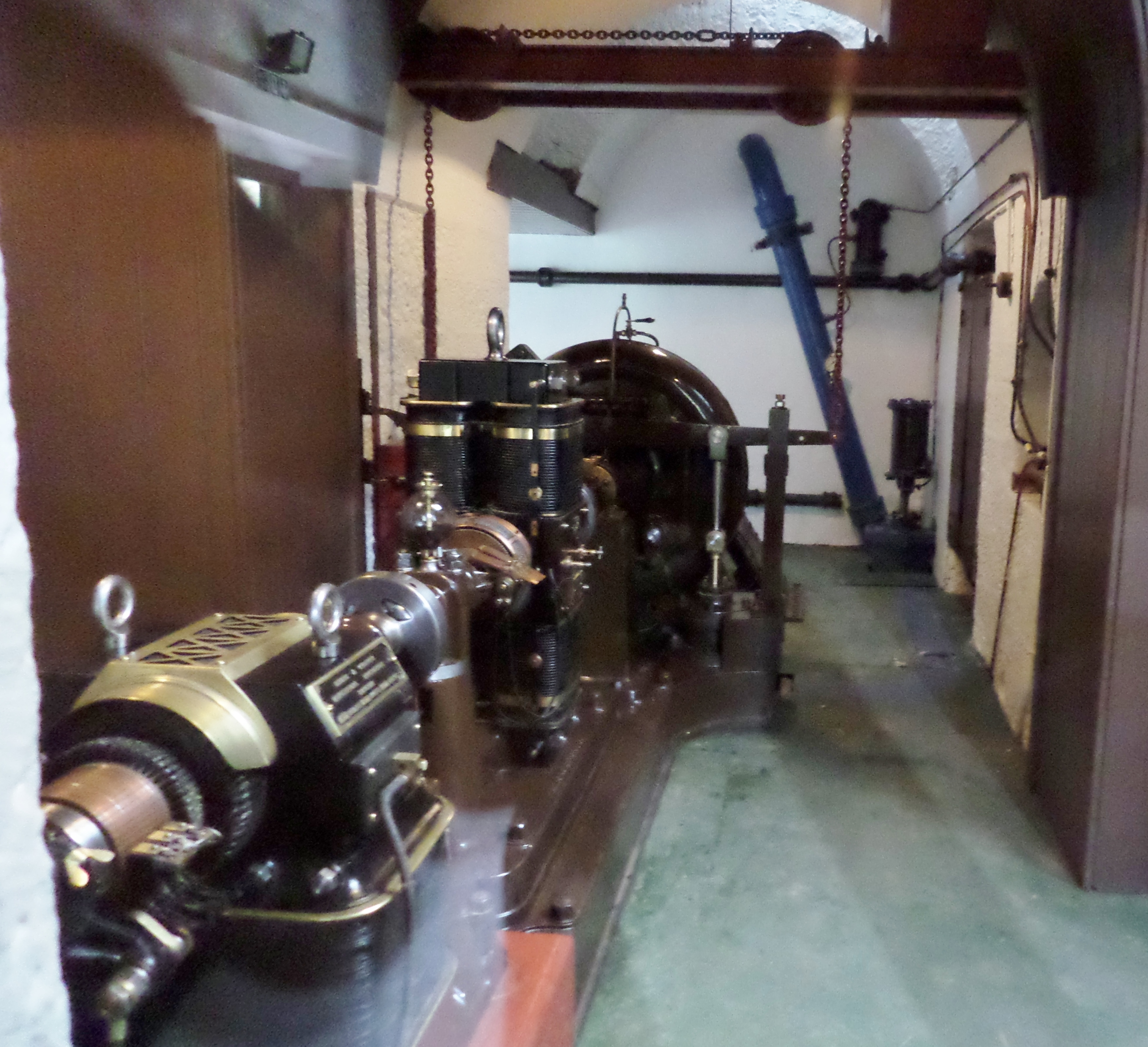
Burnfoot Power House, electricity generator

After his first visit in 1869, Shaw described the house in a letter to his wife, noting the "wonderful hydraulic machines that do all sorts of things you can imagine". By building dams, Armstrong created five new lakes on the estate, Debdon, Tumbleton, Blackburn, and the Upper and Lower lakes at Nelly's Moss. In 1868, a hydraulic engine was installed. Inspired by a watermill on the Dee in Dentdale, in 1870 Armstrong installed a Siemens dynamo in what was the world's first hydroelectric power station. The generators, which also provided power for the farm buildings on the estate, were constantly extended and improved to meet the increasing electrical demands in the house. The 2006 regeneration project included extensive rewiring. A new screw turbine, with a 17-metre (56 ft)-long Archimedes' screw, was installed in 2014; it can provide 12 kW, supplying around 10 per cent of the property's electricity consumption. (Note: Armstrong also investigated the possibilities of applying technological innovations to agricultural activities; in the mid-1890s he constructed a hydraulic silage plant on the estate at Cragend Farm. It was not a success, due to the amount of manual labour required and the gases which the process produced.)

The electricity generated was used to power an arc lamp installed in the picture gallery in 1878. This was replaced in 1880 by Joseph Swan's incandescent lamps in what Swan considered "the first proper installation" of electric lighting. Armstrong knew Swan well and had chaired the presentation of Swan's new lamps to the Literary and Philosophical Society of Newcastle upon Tyne. Historic England describes Cragside as the "first (house) in the world to be lit by electricity derived from water power". The use of electricity to run the house's appliances and internal systems made Cragside a pioneer of home automation; one of the first private residences to have a dishwasher, a vacuum cleaner and a washing machine, the conservators Sarah Schmitz and Caroline Rawson suggest Cragside was "the place where modern living began". The spit in the kitchen was also powered by hydraulics. The conservatory contained a self-watering system for the pot plants, which turned on water-powered revolving stands. Telephony was introduced, both between the rooms in the house, and between the house and other buildings on the estate. A plaque at Bamburgh Castle, Armstrong's other residence on the Northumbrian coast, records that his development of these new automated technologies "emancipated ... much of the world from household drudgery".

== Grounds and estate ==
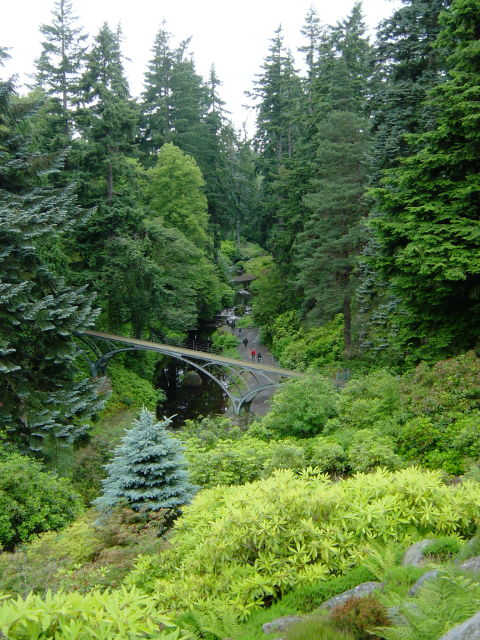
Armstrong's bridge over the Debdon Burn

Cragside is named after Cragend Hill above the house, and is surrounded by an extensive rock garden, with a collection of rhododendrons, one of which is named after Lady Armstrong, who made a considerable contribution to the design and construction of the gardens, and large plantings of mostly coniferous trees. Among these is the tallest Scots pine in Britain, at a height of 131 feet (40 m). Over one hundred years after their planting, Jill Franklin wrote that, "the great, dark trees form a protective barrier to (Armstrong's) home". Armstrong continued to buy land after the purchase of the original site and by the 1880s the gardens and grounds comprised some 1,700 acres (690 ha), with the wider estate, including Armstrong's agricultural holdings, extending to 15,000 acres (6,100 ha) according to Henrietta Heald's 2012 biography of Armstrong, and to over 16,000 acres (6,500 ha) according to the historian David Cannadine. David Dougan records the traditional claim that Armstrong planted over seven million trees in the gardens and parkland. The estate is a sanctuary for some of the last remaining red squirrel colonies in England. The glen north-west of the house is spanned by an iron bridge, crossing the Debdon Burn, constructed to Armstrong's design at his Elswick Works in the 1870s. It is a Grade II* listed structure and was restored by the Trust, and reopened to the public in 2008–2009. The gardens themselves are listed Grade I, and some of the architectural and technological structures have their own historic listings. The Clock Tower, which regulated life on the estate, dates from the time of the construction of the shooting lodge, and might have been designed by the same architect; it is not by Shaw. It is possible that Armstrong himself designed the clock. Like the bridge, the Clock Tower has a Grade II* listing. The formal gardens, where Armstrong's great greenhouses stood and which were long separated from the main estate, have now been acquired by the Trust.

== Media appearances ==
Cragside has featured in an Open University Arts Foundation Course, Jonathan Meades's documentary series Abroad Again in Britain, BBC One's Britain's Hidden Heritage, Glorious Gardens from above, Great Coastal Railway Journeys, Hidden Treasures of the National Trust and ITV's series Inside the National Trust. The 2017 film The Current War was partly filmed at the estate. Cragside featured as the basis for the representation of Lockwood Manor in Jurassic World: Fallen Kingdom.

== Sources ==
- Aslet, Clive; Powers, Alan (1985). The National Trust Book of the English House. Harmondsworth, UK: Penguin Books. OCLC 904188923.
- Aslet, Clive (2005). Landmarks of Britain. London, UK: Hodder & Stoughton. ISBN 978-0-340-73510-7.
- Binney, Marcus (2007). In Search of the Perfect House: 500 of the Best Buildings in Britain and Ireland. London, UK: Weidenfeld & Nicolson. ISBN 978-0-297-84455-6.
- Brodie, Antonia; Felstead, Alison; Franklin, Jonathan; Pinfield, Leslie; Oldfield, Jane (2001). Directory of British Architects: 1834-1914. Vol. 2: L-Z. New York and London: Continuum. ISBN 0-8264-4963-8. OCLC 1042847872.
- Cannadine, David (1992). The Decline and Fall of the British Aristocracy. London, UK: Pan Books. ISBN 978-0-330-32188-4.
- Cleary, Bryan (2006). Bamburgh Castle, Northumberland. Derby, UK: Heritage House Group. ISBN 9-78085-101419-7.
- Crook, J. Mordaunt (1999). The Rise of the Nouveaux Riches. London, UK: John Murray. ISBN 978-0-719-56040-8.
- Curl, James Stevens (1990). Victorian Architecture. Newton Abbot, England: David & Charles. ISBN 978-0-715-39144-0. OCLC 823781473.
- Dixon, Hugh (2007). Cragside. Swindon, UK: National Trust Enterprises. ISBN 978-1-843-59322-5.
- Dixon, Roger; Muthesius, Stefan (1993). Victorian Architecture. London, UK: Thames and Hudson. ISBN 978-0-195-20048-5.
- Dougan, David (1991). The Great Gun-Maker: The Life of Lord Armstrong. Morpeth, UK: Sandhill Press. ISBN 978-0-946098-23-1.
- Dutton, Ralph (1948). The English Interior – 1500 to 1900. London, UK: Batsford. OCLC 86001091.
- Ferriday, Peter (1963). Victorian Architecture. London, UK: Jonathan Cape. OCLC 270335.
- Franklin, Jill (1981). The Gentleman's Country House and its Plan 1835–1914. London, UK: Routledge & Kegan Paul. ISBN 978-0-710-00622-6.
- Friedman, Norman (2011). Naval Weapons of World War One. Barnsley, UK: Seaforth Publishing. ISBN 978-1-848-32100-7.
- Girouard, Mark (1979). The Victorian Country House. New Haven, US and London: Yale University Press. ISBN 978-0-300-02390-9.
- Greeves, Lydia (2008). Houses of the National Trust. London, UK: National Trust Books. ISBN 978-1-905-40066-9.
- Hall, Michael (2009). The Victorian Country House. London, UK: Aurum Press. ISBN 978-1-84513-457-0.
- Heald, Henrietta (2012). William Armstrong: Magician of the North. Carmarthen, UK: McNidder & Grace. ISBN 978-0-857-16042-3.
- Jenkins, Simon (2003). England's Thousand Best Houses. London, UK: Penguin Books. ISBN 978-0-713-99596-1.
- Johnston, Ian; Buxton, Ian (2013). The Battleship Builders: Constructing and Arming British Capital Ships. Barnsley, UK: Seaforth Publishing. ISBN 978-1-473-82226-9.
- Kerr, Robert (2012). The Gentleman's House. Cambridge, UK: Cambridge University Press. ISBN 978-1-108-04484-4.
- Marle, Jeroen van; Stewart, James; Walker, Neville; Williams, Christine (2015). The Rough Guide to Germany (3rd ed.). London, UK: Rough Guides Ltd. ISBN 978-1-409-36910-3.
- Muthesius, Hermann (1979) [1904]. The English House (Single volume ed.). Frogmore, UK: Granada Publishing. ISBN 978-0-258-97101-7.
- Pevsner, Nikolaus; Richmond, Ian (1992). Northumberland. The Buildings Of England. New Haven, US and London: Yale University Press. ISBN 978-0-300-09638-5.
- Reitlinger, Gerald (1961). The Economics of Taste, Vol I: The Rise and Fall of Picture Prices 1760–1960. London, UK: Barrie & Rockliff. OCLC 185950482.
- Saint, Andrew (1992). Cragside. London, UK: National Trust Enterprises. ISBN 978-0-707-80148-3.
- Saint, Andrew (2010). Richard Norman Shaw. New Haven, US and London: Yale University Press. ISBN 978-0-300-15526-6.
- Shifrin, Malcolm (2015). Victorian Turkish Baths. Swindon: Historic England. ISBN 978-1-848-02230-0. OCLC 929684255.
- Schobert, Harold (2014). Energy and Society - An Introduction. Baton Rouge, US: CRC Press. ISBN 978-1-482-21925-8.
- Smith, Crosbie; Norton Wise, M. (1989). Energy and Empire: A Biographical Study of Lord Kelvin. Cambridge, UK: Cambridge University Press. ISBN 978-0-521-12925-1. OCLC 772888593.
- Smith, Ken (2005). Emperor of Industry: Lord Armstrong of Cragside. Newcastle, UK: Tyne Bridge Publishing. ISBN 978-1-857-95127-1.
- Tinniswood, Adrian (2016). The Long Weekend: Life in the English Country House Between The Wars. London: Jonathan Cape. ISBN 978-0-224-09945-5.
- Turnor, Reginald (1950). Nineteenth Century Architecture in Britain. London, UK: Batsford. OCLC 520344.
