= Whalley Range, Manchester =

Suburb of Manchester, England

Coordinates: 53.450°N 2.253°W

Whalley Range
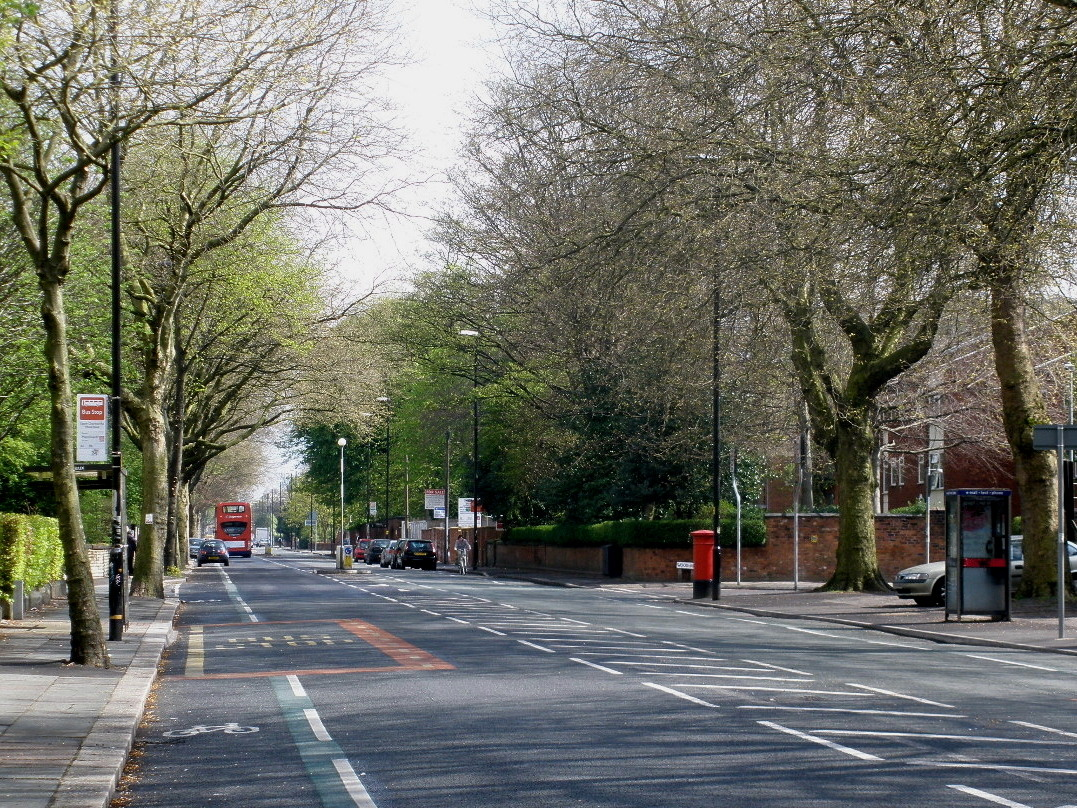
- Upper Chorlton Road in Whalley Range

- Location within Greater Manchester
- Population: 15,430 (2011)
- OS grid reference: SJ831948
- Metropolitan borough: Manchester
- Metropolitan county: Greater Manchester
- Region: North West
- Country: England
- Sovereign state: United Kingdom
- Post town: MANCHESTER
- Postcode district: M16
- Dialling code: 0161
- Police: Greater Manchester
- Fire: Greater Manchester
- Ambulance: North West
- UK Parliament: Manchester Gorton; Manchester Central
- Councillors: Angeliki Stogia (Labour); Muqaddasah Bano (Labour); Ati Zafar (Green)

Whalley Range is an area of Manchester, England, 2 miles (3.2 km) south-west of the city centre. The population at the 2011 census was 15,430. Historically in Lancashire, it was one of the earliest of the city's suburbs, built by local businessman Samuel Brooks.

== History ==
Whalley Range, formally known as Whalley in the Range, was one of Manchester's first suburbs; it was built by Manchester banker and businessman Samuel Brooks as "a desirable estate for gentlemen and their families."

In September 1834, Brooks bought 39 Lancashire acres of land from Robert Fielden, called Oak Farm in Moss Side, also known locally as Barber's Farm; he also bought 42 Lancashire acres from the Egerton Estate. This land is described in the deeds as being part of Hough Moss, but in the Egerton Estate's records as Fletcher's Moss. It was also known locally as Jackson's, Plant's or Woodall's Moss, and was part of the Manor of Withington. In 1867, the area was given its own postcode by the post office: 'Manchester SW 16'. In 1894, the area north of the Black Brook was incorporated into the newly formed Stretford Urban District.

Upon the sale of Manley Hall in 1905, a contiguous strip of land was added to the south and west of the estate for house building, formerly being a part of the township of Chorlton-cum-Hardy. Brooks drained it because all of this land was covered in peat from a thickness of eighteen inches to three feet; he built villas initially for wealthy businessmen such as himself.

Brooks was born near Whalley, Lancashire, after which he named his own home Whalley House, which may be the origin of the area's name. A toll gate guarded this exclusive area and the place where Chorlton Road and Withington Road meet is still known as Brooks's Bar. The toll gate was first removed to the junction with Wood Road and the charging of tolls came to an end on 10 June 1896.

The residents never tried to incorporate the area as a separate local authority, as in the age of light-touch government they saw no need. The area was more or less equally divided between the Moss Side and Withington Urban Districts (some existing street furniture remains from that period). The urban district councils in turn sub-contracted some functions to Lancashire County Council, notably policing (see 'Murder most foul' below). Additionally the residents paid for a private police force, to collect tolls and protect property. This arrangement seemed to be quite effective, as the area rarely appears in Victorian and Edwardian crime reports, with the one exception below. The private police survived the elimination of toll-charging and incorporation into the City, only becoming defunct with the manpower shortages of the First World War. Residents to the south of the area could also call on the Cheshire Lines Committee Police and Manchester City Council maintained a park police.

The unusual nature of the area has given rise to some myths, notably that no alcohol could be sold within it. Brooks was a High Church Anglican, so there was no religious reason for any restrictive covenants, rather a desire to keep up the tone of the area. Whalley Range had several private members' clubs (see the Carlton Club below), as well as a public hall and a cinema in Withington Road, at the end of Dudley Road. Also in Withington Road was the Caught on the Hop pub (Note: In the 1970s) on Withington Road, as well as the much older Whalley Hotel, at the Brooks' Bar corner of Upper Chorlton Road, and the Seymour at the other end; all have now been either demolished or sold for other uses.

The original plans for the area envisaged it as much larger; for instance, Hough End Crescent was meant to be an arc of very large houses, linking the ends of Alexandra and Withington Roads. This idea was made impossible by the difficulty of draining the area and the later building of the railway. Drainage difficulties are a feature of the area, as it was crossed by a large number of streams, some being notable as open sewers. (Note: Old Chorlton website) Many roads are in fact built over culverts, notably Upper Chorlton Road and Brantingham Road. As late as the 1930s, significant drainage work had to be carried out in the Manley Road area. (Note: See Manchester Local Images Collection in Manchester Central Library) Clarendon Road was built on the site of clay pits and needed remedial work on gable-ends due to subsidence in the 1980s. Even today, the remaining open brooks are regularly worked on to prevent flooding.

Incorporation shrank the area considerably, thanks to ward and constituency boundary changes. West Point was lost to Chorlton and Darley Park to Old Trafford, as well as the eastern side at the north end of Withington Road. Postcode changes, made necessary by the inter-war development of the Egerton Estate, meant that the southern end of the area was lost.

Whalley Range has had a large Polish community since the late 1940s.

By the 1960s, the area became synonymous with bedsit-land; the encroachment of property developers and gained a poor reputation as a red-light district. There has been a recent return of this phenomenon. Estate agents took to describing it as Chorlton Borders and the City Council made a short-lived attempt to rename it as East Chorlton. However, the area had two redoubtable female defenders: one of these was Ingeborg Tipping, the Chair of the Residents' Association, who made great efforts to ensure the area was properly policed, among many other matters; the other was Kath Fry, the late City Councillor, who was a highly proactive champion of the area.

In 1930, a cinema in Withington Road was opened as the West End; in 1937, it became part of the Odeon cinema chain. In 1962, it was converted into a bingo hall, but this closed in the late 1970s; it was once billed as "the largest luxury talkie theatre in Europe." After a period of dereliction, it was demolished in 1986.

On 24 June 2012, the Olympic Torch passed along the full length of Upper Chorlton Road on its nationwide tour.

=== Transport ===
Public transport was resisted until the whole area became incorporated into the City of Manchester. No railway line was allowed through it; the nearest railway station was Wilbraham Road, located at the southern end of Alexandra Road South, designed to serve the Alexandra Park Aerodrome at Hough End. The aerodrome ran a scheduled service to Croydon Airport. The travel agent, Robinson's on Withington Road, would reassure nervous passengers' relatives, by sending round a messenger boy once news of a safe landing had been received telegraphically. The aerodrome, along with its ancillary landing-field at Turn Moss in Stretford, closed in 1924. The station was closed in July 1958, although it had a one day reprieve on 7 May 1964 as Chorltonville station, for a Granada TV showcase of Blues musicians staged at the site.

Stretford horse-drawn trams had to terminate at their stables at the corner of Cornbrook Road and Chorlton Road, until Stretford built up to Brooks's Bar, when they were allowed to terminate at the Withington Road side of the Whalley Hotel. Manchester trams ended at the Prince of Wales Hotel, at the corner of Moss Lane West and Upper Moss Lane, in Moss Side. As Alexandra Road became an important shopping street, the trams terminated at their stables at the end of Range Road. By the 1920s, however, Whalley Range was fully served and the Clarendon Road/Manley Park development had its own eccentric no. 86 motorbus route. The area also had its own ghost bus, which served the above station, timed to meet trains, for at least a decade after passenger services stopped. (Note: See SELNEC timetables) Taxi ranks were established outside the shops on Withington Road, as well as outside the Whalley and Seymour Hotels, which were at the southern end of Upper Chorlton Road.

=== Manley Hall ===
Manley Hall was built by the wealthy businessman Samuel Mendel, near to the present-day Manley Park, in the 1860s. It was very grand and contained a fine art collection; the gardens were extensive and the cost of building was £120,000. After Lord Egerton, the lord of the manor, and William Cunliffe Brooks, Mendel was one of the richer residents. He converted from Judaism to High Church Anglicanism and, with the above two grandees, worshipped at the Old Church of St Clement, Chorlton. Along with Brooks and Egerton, he opposed the building of a new church for the expanding population; however, the opening of the Suez Canal caused such problems for the Mendel trading business that he became a bankrupt and the hall was put up for sale. No buyer for something so grand could be found, (cf. the fate of nearby Longford Park, bought by the local authority) and it fell into disrepair. Until it was demolished in about 1905, it was used as a pleasure garden, its most famous visitor being Buffalo Bill's Wild West Show.

=== PC Nicholas Cock ===
An infamous murder in the area occurred when it was at the height of its fashionable status in the 1870s. PC Nicholas Cock was a Lancashire Constabulary beat officer for the then sparsely populated Chorlton-cum-Hardy and Firs Farm areas. At around midnight on 1 August 1876, he was talking to a Whalley Range private policeman at the corner of Rye Bank Road and Trafford Road (now Seymour Grove). They heard a suspicious noise coming from the house of Samuel Gratrix, a wealthy member of the Manchester Exchange. They separated to investigate the outside of the property and PC Cock was fatally shot; the bullet embedded itself in the boundary wall. The building, West Point, was later substantially extended on its eastern side to become the Seymour Hotel, but the place in the wall where the bullet lodged was marked, and was visible on Woodside Road. The wall has since been demolished with the rest of the building. PC Cock died on 2 August 1876 and was buried in Chorlton's Old Churchyard, although his elaborate gravestone, paid for by public subscription, was removed in 1956 to the Lancashire Constabulary HQ at Hutton near Preston.

Two local farm labourers living at nearby Firs Farm Cottages, the Habron brothers, were suspected; William Habron (aged 18) was tried and condemned for the murder, although there must have been some doubt, as the sentence was commuted. Some years later, an infamous criminal, Charles Peace, confessed to the murder before he was due for execution; because of this, Habron was released and given £1,000, held in trust by his former employer at Firs Farm, and the Roman Catholic Bishop of Salford, Herbert Vaughan. The intention was for Habron to buy a farm locally, which would have cost around £250, but he chose to return to County Mayo in Ireland, where he ran a beer shop for many years.

=== Votes for Women ===
Whalley Range had another unusual feature for Victorian times: enfranchised women. The Poor Law Unions linked representation with taxation; anyone with an interest in real property above a certain rateable value could vote on local matters, irrespective of gender. The successor urban district councils continued this rule. In Moss Side, for instance, of the 55,000 approximate population, about 3,300 could vote. Married women could not vote, their property interests were subordinate to their husbands, but wealthy widows and single women (spinsters) could. This period of enfranchisement appears to end with incorporation. Women graduates of Oxbridge and, from 1918, seven other universities as the Combined English Universities could vote in both local and national elections, in the constituencies specifically set aside for those institutions.

== Governance ==
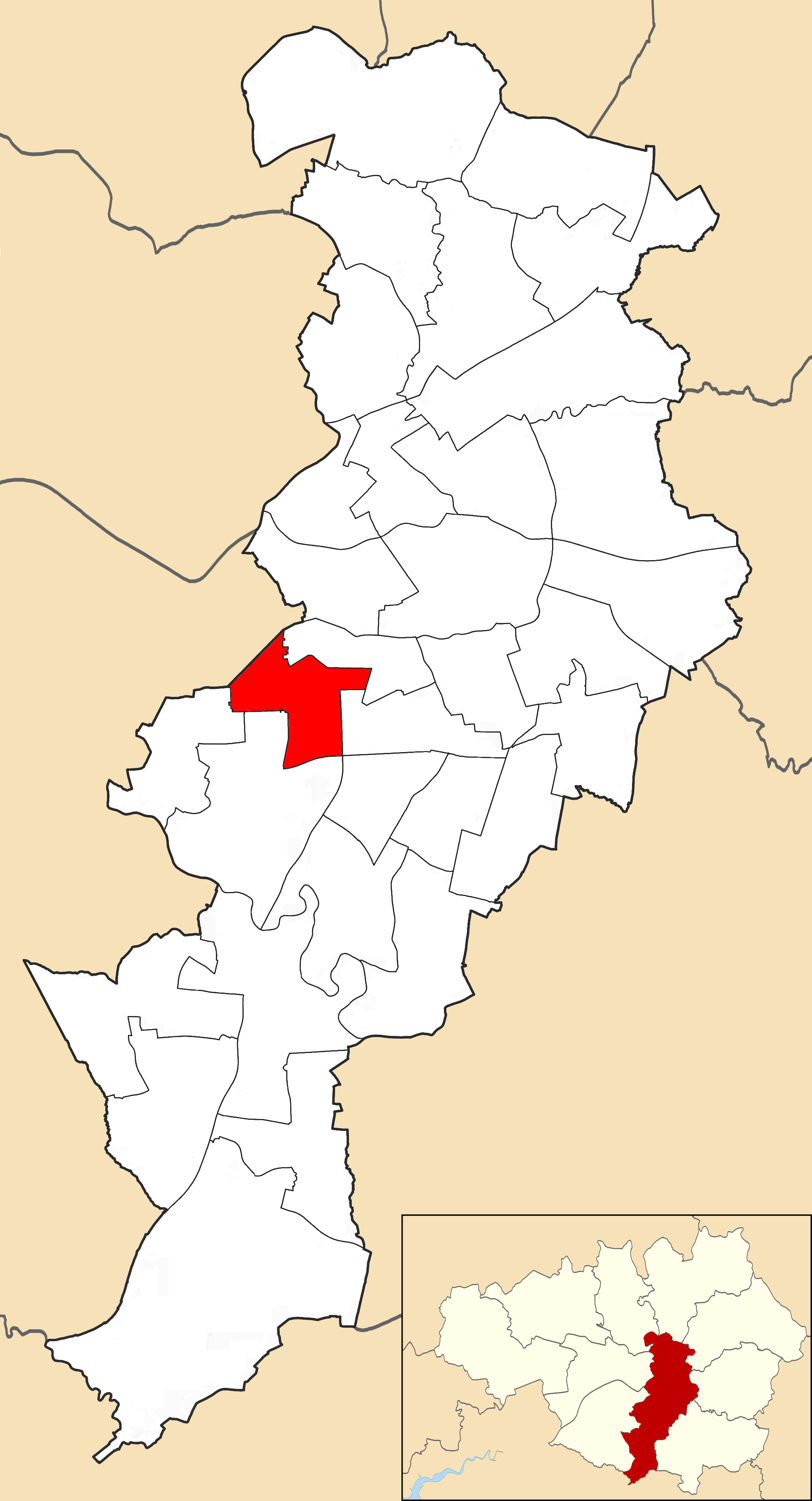
Whalley Range electoral ward within Manchester City Council.

The ward was until 2009 in Manchester Central Constituency represented by Tony Lloyd (Labour), it then became part of Manchester Gorton for the 2010 elections. The seat has been represented in Westminster by Afzal Khan since June 2017. The ward boundaries were redrawn in 2018. Some streets in the south west of the ward are now in Chorlton Park (ward) and a part of Moss Side is now included; the former part of the Moss Side ward is still part of the Manchester Central parliamentary constituency represented by Lucy Powell MP (Labour).

Councillors

The area is represented in Manchester City Council by three councillors: Angeliki Stogia (Lab Co-op), Muqaddasah Bano (Lab) and Ati Zafar (Grn).

Election	Councillor	Councillor	Councillor
2018	Angeliki Stogia (Lab)	Mary Watson (Lab)	Aftab Razaq (Lab)
2019	Angeliki Stogia (Labour Co-op)	Mary Watson (Lab)	Aftab Razaq (Lab)
2021	Angeliki Stogia (Labour Co-op)	Muqaddasah Bano (Lab)	Aftab Razaq (Lab)
2022	Angeliki Stogia (Labour Co-op)	Muqaddasah Bano (Lab)	Aftab Razaq (Lab)
2023	Angeliki Stogia (Labour Co-op)	Muqaddasah Bano (Lab)	Aftab Razaq (Lab)
2024	Angeliki Stogia (Labour Co-op)	Muqaddasah Bano (Lab)	Aftab Razaq (Lab)
2026	Angeliki Stogia (Labour Co-op)	Muqaddasah Bano (Lab)	Ati Zafar (Grn)

indicates seat up for re-election. indicates councillor defected.

== Geography ==
Whalley Range is a suburban area in south-west Manchester; it is bordered by Chorlton-cum-Hardy to the south and south-west, Old Trafford and Firswood to the north and west, Moss Side to the north-east, and Fallowfield to the south-east.

In Whalley Range there are two culverted small streams named Dog Kennel Brook and Longford Brook respectively. Dog Kennel Brook is culverted along its entire length and it is partially located in the eastern half of Whalley Range having its source in Rusholme it is suspected that it was used to fill the dog bone shaped lake in Alexandra Park. It runs underneath Alexandra Rd S for a part of its length before joining the Platt Brook the exact location of its outfall is unclear. Longford Brook is partially fed by Dog Kennel Brook via an overflow pipe. It runs under Brantingham Rd and feeds the Bridgewater Canal. It outfalls into Bent Lanes Brook a tributary of the River Irwell, all this is written about by Geoffery Ashworth in his book 'The Lost Rivers of Manchester'.

=== Topography ===
Whalley Range is characterised by large detached and semi-detached Victorian houses, many of which have been converted into flats, intermixed with late 20th century low-rise blocks of flats, with some early 20th-century housing to the west. Many of the roads and avenues are lined with trees. The district has limited shopping facilities, as these were felt to be unnecessary for the class of person envisaged as a resident; these are predominantly found on Withington Road and on Upper Chorlton Road.

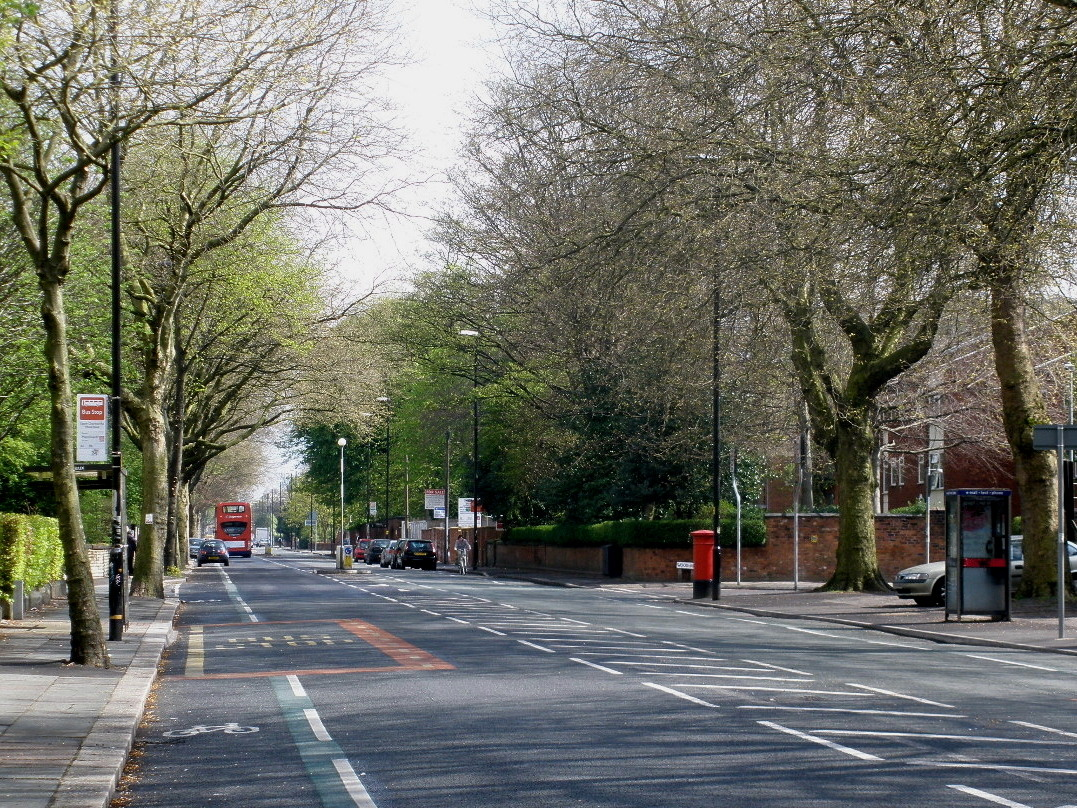
Upper Chorlton Road, looking north-east from the Wood Road inward bus stop

A peculiarity of Upper Chorlton Road is that along most of its length the two sides of the road are in separate metropolitan boroughs, with the boundary in the centre of the road; going southwards, the left side is in the City of Manchester and the right side in the Borough of Trafford. The street furniture is different. In the earlier 20th century, the tramway systems were different; Manchester Corporation Tramways designs were faced by those of Stretford Urban District. Boundary anomalies along the route were only corrected in the late 1980s. Upper Chorlton Road was laid out so that the classical doorway of Williams & Glyn's Bank, (Note: Now occupied by a bookmaker) on Chorlton Road in Old Trafford, was visible along almost all its length. The road had several drill halls on its length.

The most obvious is the red-brick castellated building at the corner of Kings Road (in Old Trafford). It dates from 1903 and the design is influenced by Tudor architecture. It actually extended over a considerable area to the rear; it is now occupied by the M16 Postal Sorting Office, some open land and derelict buildings. It housed a military police unit and the Air Training Corps but there is the 207 Manchester Field Hospital in 2011. The ATC has moved to Hough End in Withington, a relic of its time as Alexandra Park Aerodrome. The Yeomanry had two depots on Upper Chorlton Road; one is now a housing estate, the other a Council depot. A largely redundant centre is still in partial use near the end of College Road, it formerly housed the Royal Corps of Transport (now in Weaste) and the Royal Marines.

The area also had a feature that appears in many Victorian and Edwardian large-scale developments in Manchester: the entirely private road. Some can still be seen off Wilbraham Road and the best example elsewhere in the area is Green Walk off Wood Road. Wellington Road was only adopted by the highway authority within living memory; the stretch between Alness Road and Alexandra Road is still wholly owned by St Bede's College, as it bisects their campus. The area also has no 'streets', as these were a status indicator to Victorians. The few extant highways were renamed 'road' from 'lane', as this also indicated a certain status. This appears to be merely a fashion, however, as later Victorians appeared to favour the bucolic part of the 'rus in urbes' equation. Too bucolic, however, was not popular either: Doghouse Lane became Kingsbrook Road and Dark Lane became Clarendon Road.

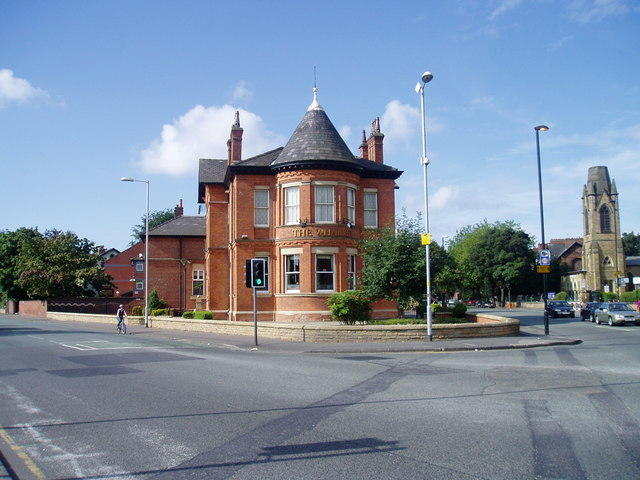
Whalley Hotel, Brooks's Bar

=== Demographics ===
According to the 2011 census

- White British – 38.7%
- White Other – 7.0%
- White Irish – 2.5%
- Mixed Race – 5.3%
- British Asian – 30.7%
- Black British – 10.1%
- Arab or other – 5.5%

== Religion ==
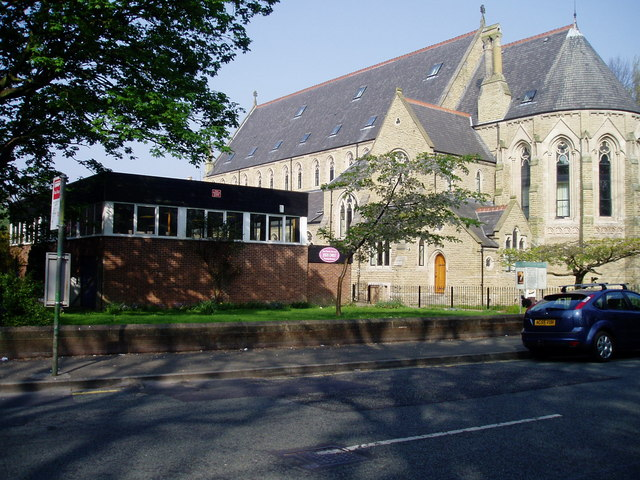
The former St Edmund's Church

=== Churches and chapels ===
Religion played a major role in Victorian life, and the size and number of religious buildings testifies to this. Although Brooks was a High Church Anglican, he allowed non-Anglican Christian denominations (Roman Catholics, Methodists, and other non-conformists) to buy and build on substantial plots, as long as these were on the fringes of the development.

There are Anglican parish churches in Whalley Range: St Margaret's, significantly positioned in the heart of the original phase of development, on the corner of Whalley Road and Rufford Road, and St Edmund's on Alexandra Road South opposite Alexandra Park. The original St Edmund's Grade II listed building has been converted into apartments, and the church congregation now meets in the modern worship-centre next door. Also on Alexandra Road South is the Manchester Chinese Church, and on Withington Road is Whalley Range Methodist Church. Manley Park Methodist Church is on Egerton Road North; the congregation began worshipping in a tin tabernacle in 1905 and the present building was opened in 1910. The Welsh Methodist congregation worshipped next door, in a smaller brick building.

Near Hartley Hall is the English Martyrs Roman Catholic Church, built in 1895–96: the tall spire is its most remarkable feature. From the time of the school's move to Alexandra Road South, St Bede's College supported the nearby St Bede's Mission, and priests on the school's staff worked to provide for the spiritual needs of the Catholic population in Whalley Range. In 1893 the Bishop of Salford, John Bilsborrow, appointed Father James Rowan, a former teacher at the college, as priest-in-charge of the district. The new church was consecrated on the Feast of the English Martyrs, 4 May 1922. There were also two convents; the Cenacle, on Alexandra Road South, and Mount Carmel, on Whalley Road. Another Roman Catholic congregation meets in Deerpark Road.

There are also New Testament Church of God (in Upper Chorlton Road, formerly a Nonconformist chapel, and lacking the upper part of the spire which was deliberately removed), and Spiritualist (in Alexandra Road South) churches.

=== Other places of worship ===
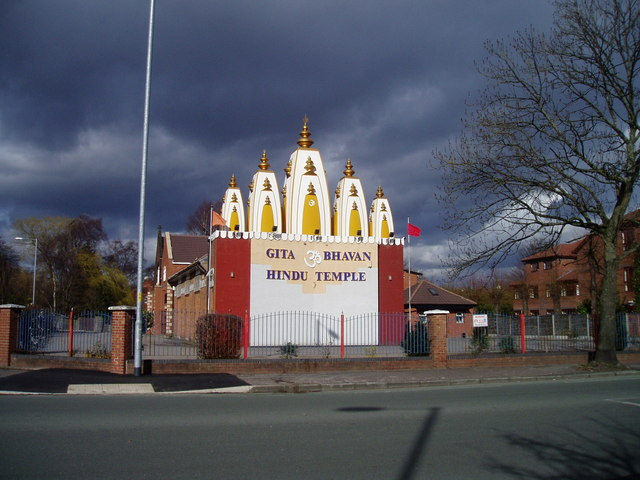
Gita Bhavan Hindu Temple, Wilbraham Road

The Minhaj-ul-Qur'an Central Mosque is on Withington Road and the British Muslim Heritage Centre occupies what was formerly the Northern Congregational College in College Road. One of the earliest mosques is the Zakariyyah Mosque on Clarendon Road, dating back to the early 1980s. There are a number of smaller mosques. There is a Hindu temple in a former chapel on the corner of Wilbraham Road and Withington Road; on Upper Chorlton Road near Brooks's Bar is a Sikh temple. A new £2 million Gurdwara (Sikh place of worship) and cultural centre has been constructed on Upper Chorlton Road. This opened on 14 March 2011. The Vairochana Buddhist Centre was once in Dudley Road but has moved to Chorlton-cum-Hardy. The ISKCON Hare Krishna movement has a centre on Mayfield Road.

== Sport ==
Whalley Range AFC was founded in 1900 and is still going to this day. It is based at Kings Road, Whalley Range; the entrance gates are opposite Daventry Road. It has two pitches, clubhouse, changing rooms and an outside bar. Its first team plays in the Cheshire Football League on Saturdays.

An earlier Whalley Range club was formed in 1887 and folded in 1892. As well as entering the Manchester Junior Cup, they were also members of the first Manchester League for both its seasons 1890-1892. Other notable Whalley Range football clubs were Whalley Range Presbyterian (1905-1912), and Whalley Range Wesleyans (1901-1907).

Whalley Range Lawn Tennis & Cricket Club was established in 1845.

== Education ==
The Lancashire Independent College at College Road (1840–43) was established by the Lancashire Congregational Union to train ministers for service. The architects were Francis Chester and John Gould Irwin; the style is neo-Gothic. George Hadfield MP gave £2,000 towards the building costs and laid the foundation stone. It is the area's best-known building and has been in continuous educational use since it was built.

Following the Nazi takeover of Czechoslovakia in 1938, the University used it to house refugee Czech academics and intellectuals. Ironically, in the German Invasion Handbook for Operation Sea Lion (Unternehmen Seelöwe), it was named as one of several large properties in the area suitable for use by the occupation authorities. It closed as a Congregational College in the late 20th century and has since been reused by the General, Municipal and Boilermakers' Union (GMB) as a training centre for their trade union members. At the beginning of this century the union tried to sell it to developers. A successful protest movement was convened by Jeremi Palka-Zawadzki, a long-term resident, and others.

It now operates as the British Muslim Heritage Centre (BMHC) and has undergone a multimillion-pound repair and renovation. The centre held its first public outdoor event, BMHC Family Day, on Sunday 1 May 2011.

=== Schools ===
==== Secondary schools ====
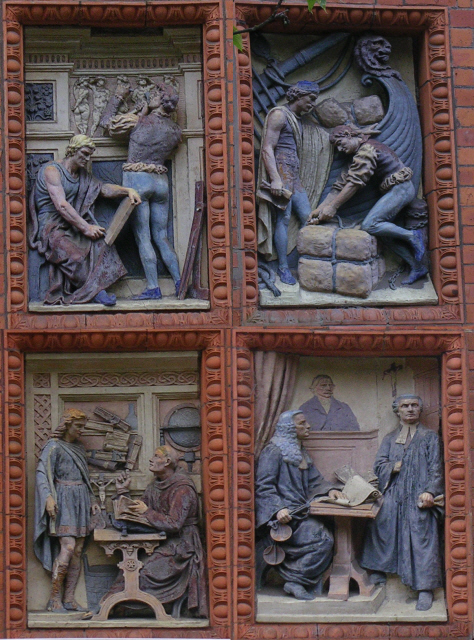
Four decorative panels by George Tinworth, from St Bede's College, Manchester

St Bede's College (on Alexandra Road South), a Roman Catholic independent school founded in 1876, was originally built as an aquarium but this was not a commercial success. The college acquired it after having been established in Manchester city centre. It is built of red brick and terracotta and the frontage is very ornate. If the building appears asymmetrical, that is because the money ran out for a wing on the north side of the main entrance, built in the 1870s. It was only in the 1930s that the College gave up the land at the end of Mayfield Road, preferring to expand eclectically westwards toward Alness Road, then known as Albert Road. At the same time, it sold its playing fields, which had been between College Road and Burford Road; this was originally the site of Whalley Range Cricket Club and where St Margaret's C.E. Primary now has its playing fields, acquiring the freehold of Whalley Farm. The area west of Withington Road became playing fields, the rest continued as a farm until the late 1960s, when it became the site of St George's RC High School. In the 1980s, the Cenacle Convent's large red brick building on Wellington Road became part of the College's campus, along with the area freed by the demolition of several houses on that road.

William Hulme's Grammar School (in Springbridge Road) was established as an independent school in 1887; it became a direct grant grammar school in 1946 and returned to full independence in 1976. In 2007, the school rejoined the state education sector, scrapping its annual tuition fees and selective admissions test in exchange for funding as an academy. The school's specialist subject is languages and it will continue to select 10% of its pupils on the basis of their aptitude for modern languages.

Hartley College further down Alexandra Road South was built as a Primitive Methodist College in 1879; it is now a Muslim school, Kassim Darwish Grammar School for Boys.

Whalley Range High School and Business and Enterprise College is a large non-denominational secondary school for girls on Wilbraham Road, where it moved to in the 1930s from a smaller site on the corner of Burford Road and Withington Road (known then as 'Britannia Row', because of the large statue of Britannia on the frontage of an annexe on Burford Road. The statue came from Manchester's old Town Hall on King Street). There was also a Preparatory Department at Crimsworth, now the site of Manley Park Junior School. The anomalous bulge and bend in Withington Road at this point is explained by the need for a carriage entrance to this building. Unusually, the school had begun as a boys' school on Graeme Street, before moving to this site. It only became a girls' school in 1891, as a counterpart to the two boys' schools mentioned above. Nowadays, the large majority of students is from minority ethnic backgrounds, many originating in Pakistan. Almost all of the students in the sixth form are from minority ethnic backgrounds. The number of students whose first language is other than English is much higher than the national average, with the three most common languages spoken by students being Urdu, Somali and Arabic. The school has specialist status as a business and enterprise college and, since 2007, has also been a designated sports college. Estelle Morris, now Baroness Morris of Yardley and one-time Secretary of State for Education and Skills and Minister for the Arts, is a notable alumnus.

==== Primary schools ====
Our Lady's R.C. Primary School on Whalley Road was partly housed, until the 1990s, in the former Imperial German consulate, seized during the First World War by the Custodian of Enemy Property.

Originally, there was meant to be a third parallel road to York Avenue and Cromwell Avenue, called Woodlands Road, but the authorities noticed the large number of children now growing up in the area. The developer was therefore only allowed to build Bury Avenue; the rest of the plot was devoted to Manley Park County Primary School and a recreation ground, now known as Manley Park. (Note: It was known colloquially as The Rec until the 1980s) After the phase of further developments on the Egerton Estate, the school expanded into the Crimsworth Annexe, a large house and garden at the west end of College Road.

St Margaret's CE Primary School on Withington Road occupies the pre-Second World War site of Whalley Range High School. The playing fields at the rear had formerly belonged to St Bede's College.

== Hospitals ==
The Spire Manchester Hospital was located in Russell Road; it was formerly run by BUPA. The private hospital was demolished, after Spire relocated to West Didsbury in 2016. The site was once occupied by the Nello James Centre, named after C. L. R. James; it had been a Red Cross hospital dating from the First World War. Another former hospital was St Joseph's Hospital.

== Cultural associations ==
The poet Jane Crewdson lived for part of her life in Whalley Range. The writer Dodie Smith spent part of her early life at Claremont, Wood Road, as she records in her autobiography Look Back With Love (1974).

The district has a number of cultural associations, including:

- Steve Hopkins, record producer and keyboardist of John Cooper Clarke, Nico, the Invisible Girls and the Archangel Orchestra, lives in Whalley Range and has an art studio there.
- The Smiths' eponymous album mentions Whalley Range in the song "Miserable Lie", with the lyrics "What do we get for our trouble and pain? / Just a rented room in Whalley Range".
- Nigel Pivaro, actor and journalist, was baptised at English Martyrs RC Church in 1960.
- Les Dawson, comedian and writer, died at the Spire Hospital on 10 June 1993.
- Michael McGoldrick (born 26 November 1971, Manchester, England) is a folk musician who plays Irish flute, uilleann pipes, low whistle and bodhran. McGoldrick is the composer of the very popular tune "Farewell to Whalley Range which he has recorded with John McSherry on their album At First Light, and on the Capercaille album Nadurra.
- Philomena Lynott (1930-2019), Irish mother of Thin Lizzy frontman Phil Lynott, ran the Clifton Grange Hotel (on the corner of Wellington Road and Alness Road) from 1966 to 1980. On visits to Manchester, Phil Lynott would stay, and wrote songs about the colourful 'showbiz' clientele who would frequent the hotel. The Thin Lizzy songs "Clifton Grange Hotel", "Johnny The Fox Meets Jimmy The Weed" and "The Boys Are Back in Town" were inspired by characters and events in the hotel.

== Notable people ==
- John Prettyjohns VC, the first Royal Marine to be awarded the Victoria Cross, was subsequently the Steward of the Whalley Range Bowling Club on Demesne Road.
- Bishop Geoffrey Ignatius Burke MA (1913-1999) was an English Roman Catholic bishop.
- The band James formed here in 1982.
- Comedian Jason Manford grew up in Whalley Range and went to St. Margaret's Primary School on Withington Road.
- Noel Aspinall, Archdeacon of Manchester; Rector of St Edmund, Whalley Range and of St George's, Hulme.
- Gillian Gilbert of New Order was born here.

== See also ==
- Listed buildings in Manchester-M16
- Category:People from Whalley Range
