= Manley Hall, Manchester =

Coordinates: 53°26′58″N 2°16′3″W

Manley Hall was a large house in Whalley Range, Manchester. It was a two-storey Victorian Italianate building with fifty rooms, very grandly furnished and with a fine art collection. It stood in 80 acres (32 ha) of exotic gardens with artificial lakes and many greenhouses in which orchids were grown.

The house was built for the wealthy businessman Samuel Mendel and was completed in 1857. Mendel occupied the house from 1858. Born in Liverpool of Jewish origin he was the so-called "Merchant Prince" of Manchester's textile industry, who made a fortune by providing the fastest export routes round the Cape of Good Hope to India and Australia. At the height of his commercial success he converted from Judaism to High Church Anglicanism, and became a significant local figure as trustee of St Clement's Church, Chorlton-cum-Hardy, despite Manley Hall being outside the Parish boundary. When the Suez Canal opened in 1869 he lost his commercial advantage and in 1875 was forced to sell Manley Hall and its contents. The contents of the house were sold in an auction that lasted five days.

A second sale was held on 9 July 1879 by order of the Court of Chancery for the County Palatine and was bought by Mendell for £85,000. In 1879 a company formed to buy the estate and turn the gardens into a public pleasure park which failed after two years. Its most famous visitor was "Buffalo Bill's Wild West Show". The grounds were then progressively sold for housing and the hall itself finally demolished in 1905. Manley Park playing fields is the only part of the original grounds which has not been built over.
