= Samuel Mendel =

Merchant in Manchester (1811–1884)

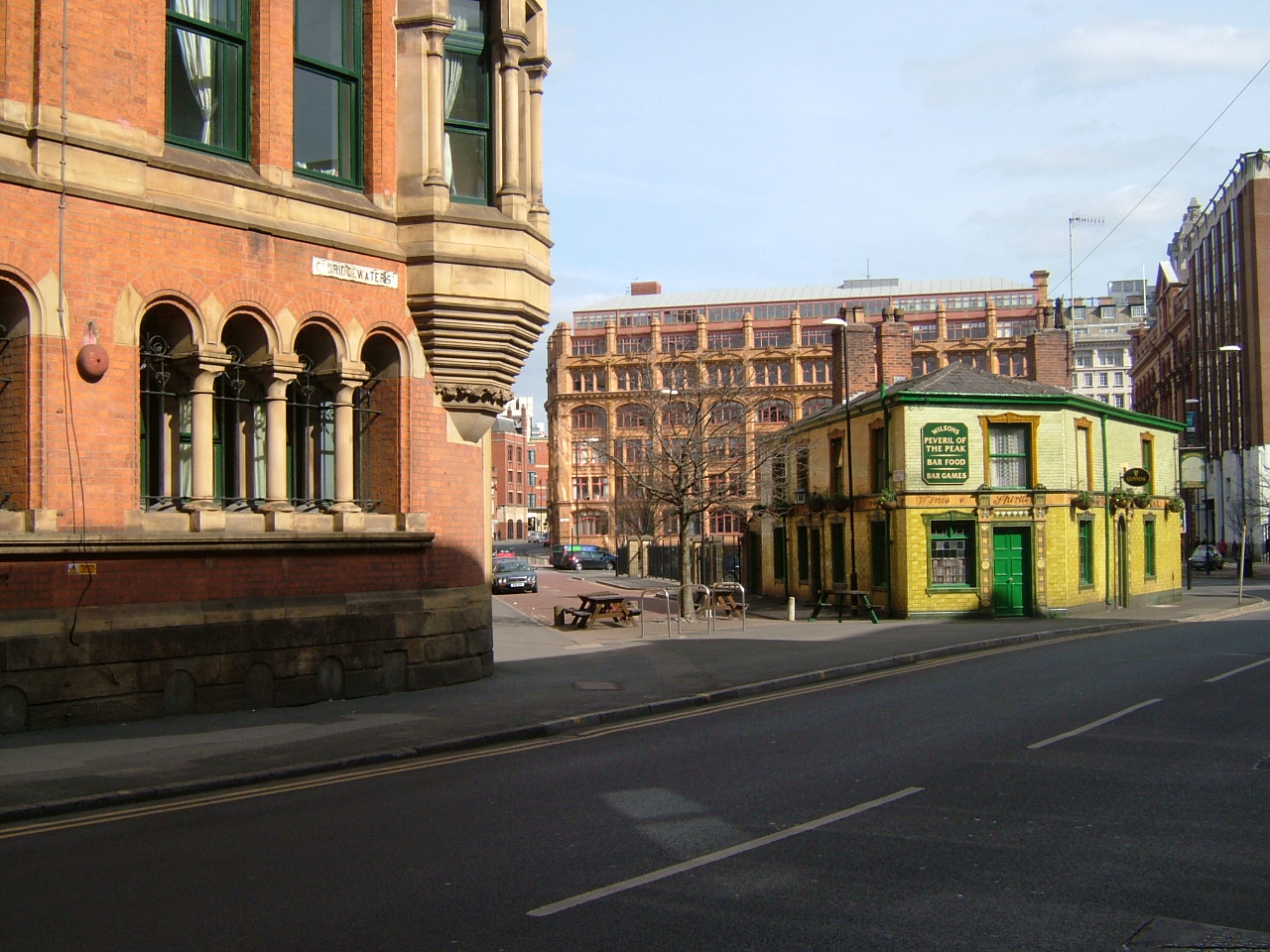
Chepstow House (left); the Peveril of the Peak public house (right)

Sam Mendel (1811–1884), the "Merchant Prince", was one of the leading merchants in Manchester during its rise to industrial prominence. He was born in Liverpool, but the family soon relocated to Manchester where his father, Emmanuel, established a rope, twine, and pitch-paper business and then later a hotel, the Manchester and Liverpool (subsequently known as Mendel's Hotel). Samuel first worked in a warehouse on Bow Street belonging to Mr. B. Liebert, and during this time he also travelled extensively. Building on his experience he began his own business and rapidly became one of Manchester's leading textile merchants. He built a large warehouse, Chepstow House, in Great Bridgewater Street, central Manchester.

At first he resided at Greenheys Priory, formerly the family home of Thomas De Quincey. He then built a substantial mansion, Manley Hall, in Whalley Range and filled it with an impressive collection of art (much of it acquired with the aid of the noted art dealers Thomas Agnew & Sons). While resident there he converted from Judaism to High Church Anglicanism and became a trustee of St Clement's Church, Chorlton-cum-Hardy, despite not residing in the parish. Along with another trustee, William Cunliffe Brooks, he controversially opposed the building of the new, larger church. He was also the patron of the village brass band.

Due to difficulties with his business, caused by the alterations to trade arising from the opening of the Suez Canal, he was forced to sell Manley Hall and to abandon most of his business interests. There was a sale of his art collection at Christie's in 1875. His later years were spent in reduced circumstances in Chislehurst. He died in Balham in 1884.
