= North Eastern Region of British Railways =

Former British Railways operating region

- Region logo from 1965 to 1966
- Franchise: Not subject to franchising (1 January 1948 – 31 December 1966)
- Main Regions: North East of England, Yorkshire and the Humber
- Parent company: British Rail

The North Eastern Region was a region of British Railways from 1948, whose operating area could be identified by the tangerine-coloured signs and colour schemes that adorned its stations and other railway buildings. It was merged with the Eastern Region in 1967. It was the near direct post-nationalisation descendant of the North Eastern Railway, that had merged with some other companies to form the LNER in 1923.

In 1958 in a major re-drawing of the region boundaries it gained those former LMS lines that lay in the present-day West and North Yorkshire. In 1967 it was disbanded and merged with the Eastern Region.

== The Network ==
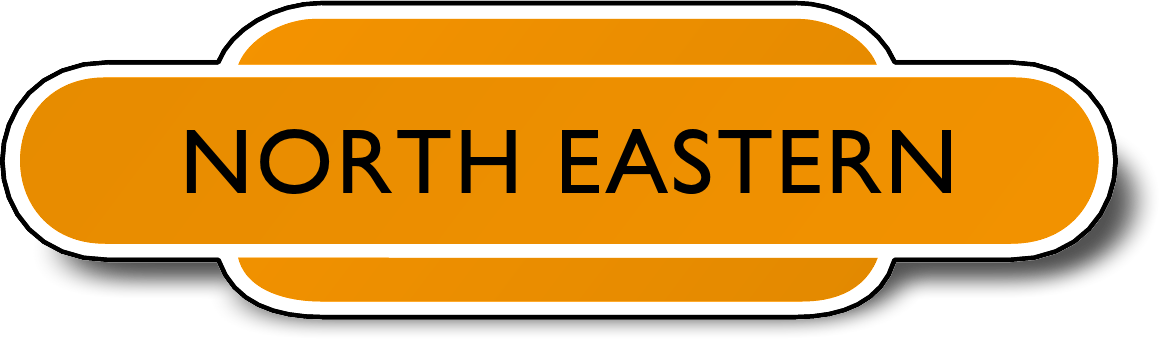
Station totem design prior to 1965

The region's trunk routes comprised several important lines. Principal among these was the northernmost portion of the East Coast Main Line in England which ran northwards from Doncaster to Marshall Meadows Bay at the Scottish Border where the route became the responsibility of the Scottish Region. The eastern section of the Trans-Pennine route, Hull to Leeds, also ran through this region, as did the Newcastle and Carlisle Railway. Other connecting routes, largely originating with the former North Eastern Railway connected to the major lines throughout the then counties of Northumberland, Durham and the North Riding and East Riding of Yorkshire.

The conurbations of Tyneside, Wearside and Teesside contained a high density of lines carrying not only suburban passenger traffic but also large volumes of freight generated by the coal, steel and chemical industries of the area. There were also branch lines of rural character, particularly in the remoter parts of Northumberland and Durham and the Yorkshire Dales and Moors: these rural lines would bear the brunt of closures during the Beeching period and after.

== Locomotives and Rolling Stock ==
From Nationalisation the locomotives working in the region remained mainly those of the former North Eastern Railway and LNER. Between 1949 and 1951, 28 locos built to what was essentially the 1898 design of the old NER E1 now known by its LNER designation J72 were constructed in the region at Darlington Works. This was a rare, possibly unique, example of a locomotive class which was built, substantially unchanged, under pre-grouping, post-grouping and British Railways administration.

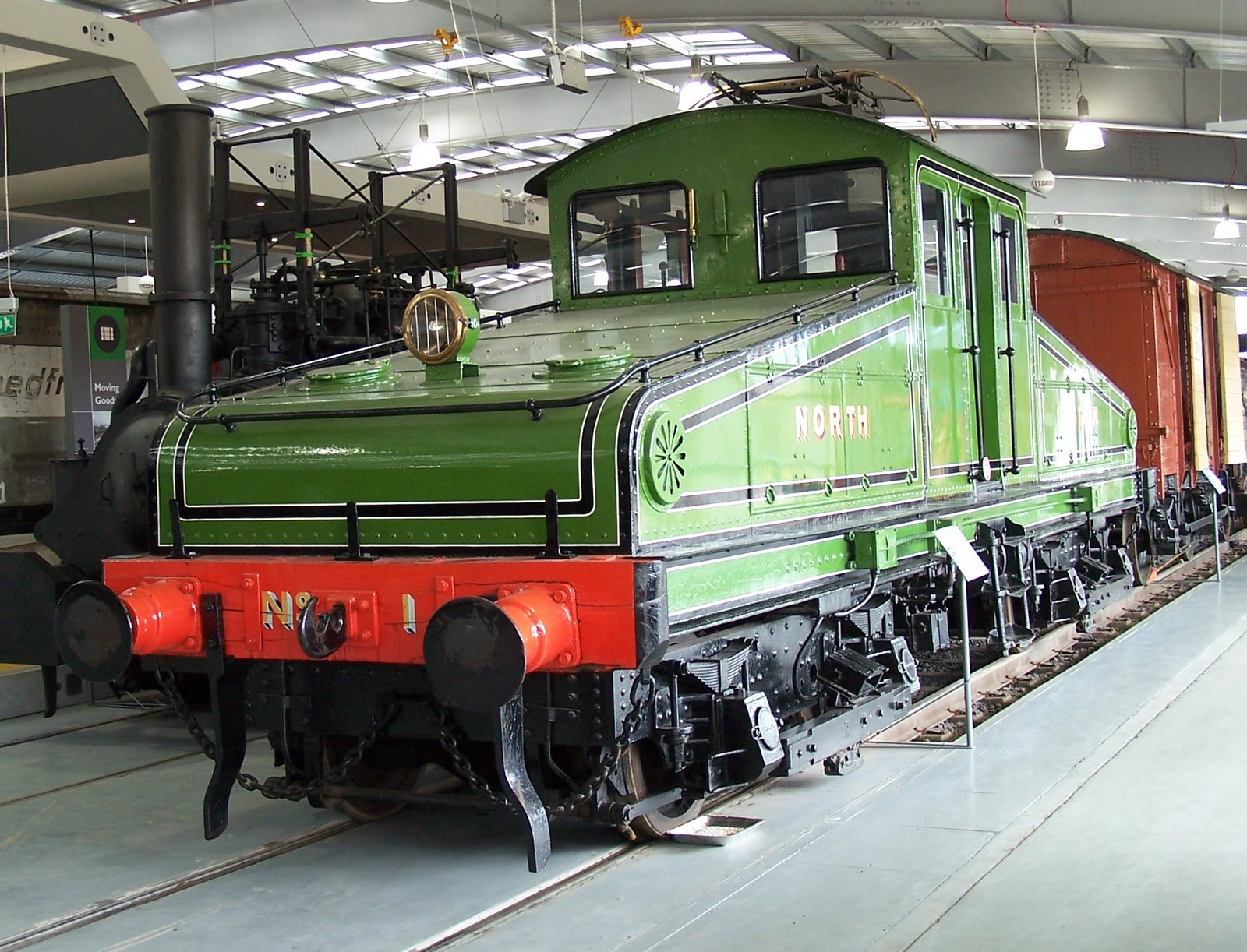
A British Rail Class ES1/NER No.1 electric locomotive

As the BR Standard steam locomotives became available they began to appear but with some notable exceptions: for example no standard pacifics ever found a home in the region. Former LMS locomotive types also began to work in the region from the late 1950s onwards and became a familiar sight on the Stainmore line and on the coastal passenger routes in Yorkshire. The former North Eastern Railway freight types proved especially long-lived and many lasted until the end of steam in the region (by then part of the Eastern) in 1967.

The region worked closely with its neighbours to modernise services on the major trunk routes. From 1961 it received six of the 22 production Deltic diesel-electric locomotives which enabled the acceleration of many of the East Coast Main Line passenger services between King's Cross and Scotland.

== Electrified lines ==
Most lines had steam traction until dieselisation became widespread. A notable exception was in the Newcastle area where some suburban lines were electrified using 3rd rail at 630V DC as part of the Tyneside Electrics system. In the same area access to the Newcastle Quayside branch was by dual 3rd-rail and overhead electric traction. NER No.1, an electric shunting locomotive, once used on the Quayside Branch in Newcastle upon Tyne, is now at the Locomotion museum in Shildon, County Durham. It is one of a class of two locomotives built specifically for the branch using American designs and powerplants, which served from 1903 until 1964.
