= Frank West Rich =

English architect

Frank West Rich (14 August 1840 – 25 February 1929) was an English architect who mainly worked in the Newcastle upon Tyne area.

== Life ==
Frank West Rich was born in Darfield, West Riding of Yorkshire in 1840 and was educated at Whitwell, Derbyshire. It appears from the 1861 Census that he trained as a joiner and was 23 before he was articled to William Parnell, an architect in Newcastle upon Tyne. He worked with Parnell until 1872 during which time the firm built the Tyne Theatre and Opera House in Newcastle upon Tyne in 1867. Rich set up his own practice at 1 Moseley Street in Newcastle upon Tyne in 1872. He married Mary Elliott in 1868 and had three sons and a daughter. Two of his sons, Edmund and Roland, also became architects. From 1881 the family home was in Jesmond Gardens. In 1903 Rich purchased Dues Hill Grange and 3000 acres of land in Holystone, Northumberland, which he subsequently renovated.

Rich designed many buildings in the Newcastle upon Tyne area, including the Watch Club House in Cullercoats (1877–79), Ouseburn School (1893) and St Gabriel's Church in Heaton (1905). In the 1880s he had the role of architectural consultant to Sir William Armstrong and designed workshops and offices at his Elswick works in Newcastle upon Tyne. He designed the north block of what was later known as the EF Turnbull warehouse for Robinson & Co in 1888 in Newcastle upon Tyne. Additions were made to the south in 1897 and a tower constructed in 1898. Rich also designed for Sir Andrew Noble, building extensions to Jesmond Dene House (1896–97), which had been originally designed by RN Shaw. He also added a stable block to Otterburn Tower for Howard Pease in 1904. Rich also made additions to Chesters (Humshaugh) in Northumberland (1895), another building on which RN Shaw had worked. He was a member of the Northern Architects Association serving as its president, Vice President and Hon Secretary in the 1880s and 1890s. He was elected a FRIBA in 1898. He died in 1929.

== Works ==
- Watch Club House, Cullercoats (1877–79)
- EF Turnbull warehouse (1888–98), Newcastle upon Tyne
- Ouseburn School (1893)
- Co-operative Society Printing Works, Newcastle upon Tyne (1895)
- Chesters (Humshaugh), additions (1895)
- Jesmond Dene House, extensions (1896–97)
- Otterburn Tower, stable block (1904)
- St Gabriel's Church, Heaton (1905)
- Bolbec Hall, Newcastle upon Tyne, (1907)
