= William Parnell (architect) =

- Born: William B. Parnell
- Died: 1886; Croydon
- Occupation: Architect
- Years active: Mid–late 19th century
- Notable work: Tyne Theatre and Opera House

William B. Parnell (d. Croydon, 1886) was an architect active in the 19th century particularly in Newcastle upon Tyne, England. A number of his works on Newcastle Quayside near the then future location of the Tyne Bridge were built following the Great fire of Newcastle and Gateshead in 1854. Noted architect Frank West Rich served as an apprentice under Parnell.

Parnell trained under Edward I'Anson in London before relocating to Newcastle upon Tyne. In Newcastle upon Tyne he was located at 21 Collingwood Street.

Parnell's Tyne Theatre and Opera House operates to this day. Parnell architected Phoenix House that was built for Royal Insurance. Shipping company Nielsen, Andersen & Company had operated out of offices within some of the buildings that Parnell architected on King and Queen Streets on Newcastle Quayside.

== Noted works in Newcastle upon Tyne ==
- St Nicholas' Buildings, St Nicholas Street (1850), Grade II listed building
- Exchange Buildings, King Street (1862), Grade II listed building
- Princes Buildings, 1–23 (odd numbers) Queen Street (1863), Grade II listed building
- Tyne Theatre and Opera House (1867), Grade I listed building
- Phoenix House, Sandhill (c. 1869, built for Royal Insurance), Grade II listed building
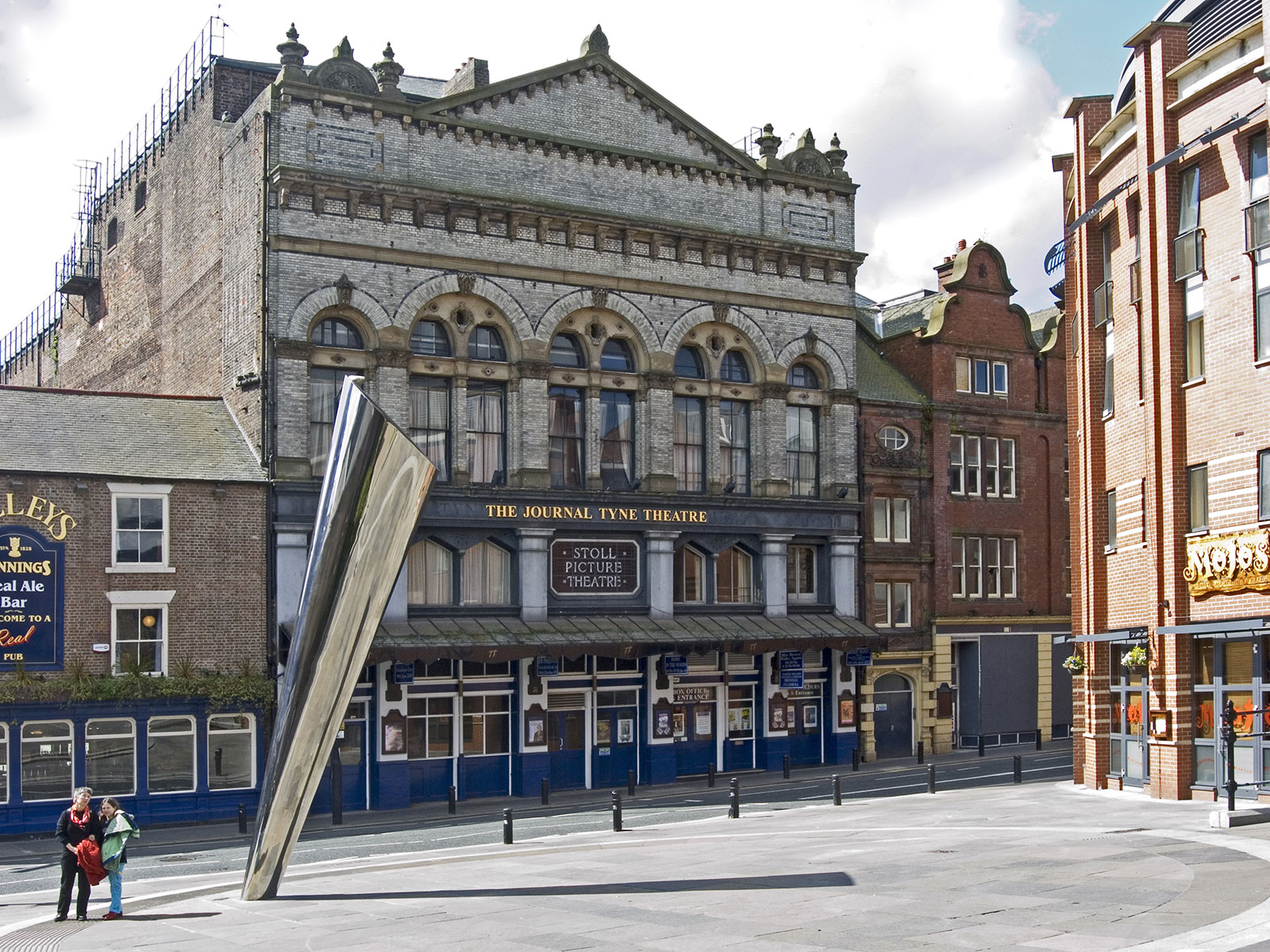
Tyne Theatre and Opera House

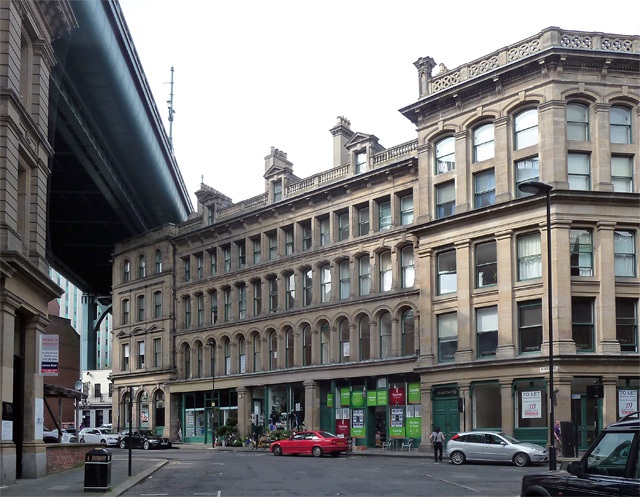
Princes Buildings, Queen Street

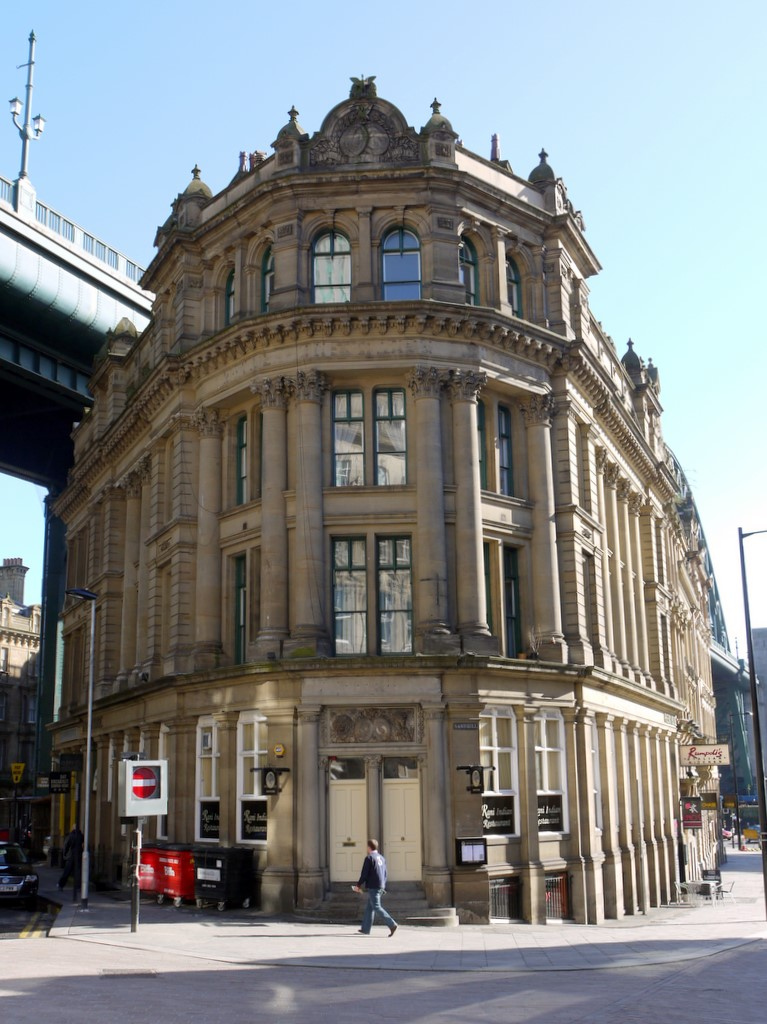
Phoenix House, Sandhill

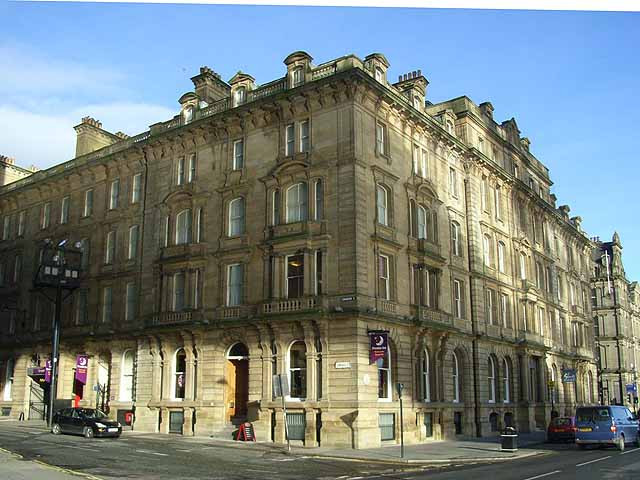
Exchange Buildings, King Street

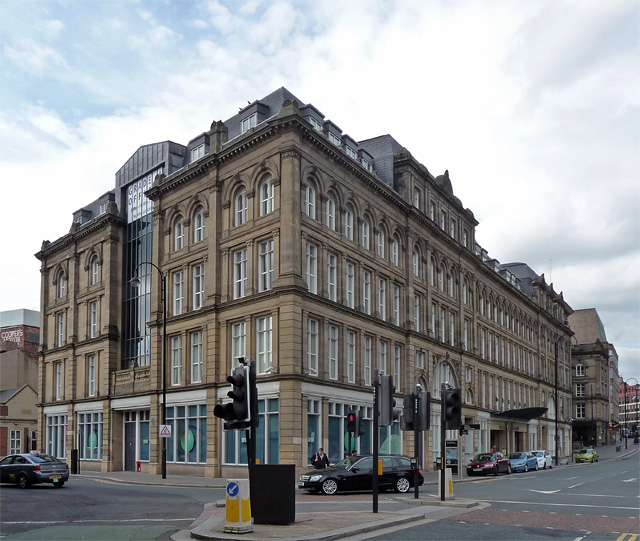
St Nicholas Buildings, St Nicholas Street
