= Nielsen, Andersen & Company =

English merchant and shipbroker firm

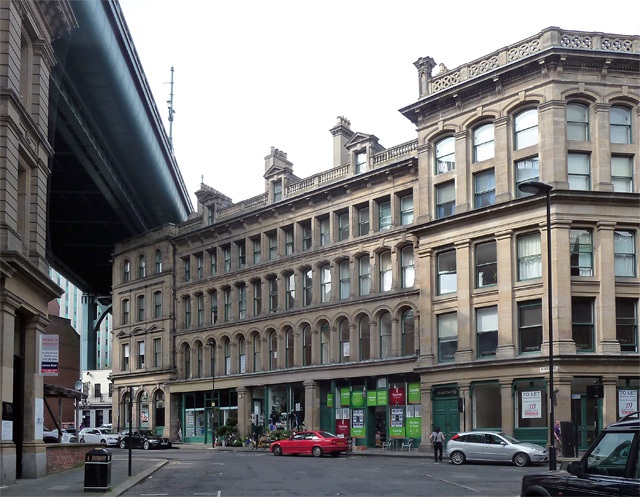
- Princes Buildings, Queen Street, Newcastle
- Type: Limited company
- Industry: Maritime transport
- Founded: 1869; 157 years ago in Newcastle upon Tyne, England
- Founders: A.P. Andersen; Herman Ferdinand Nielsen
- Headquarters: Newcastle upon Tyne, England
- Area served: North East England; Europe
- Key people: Joseph William Atkinson; Arthur Waldemar Carrall; James Vallans Haswell; Kristian Host

Nielsen, Andersen & Company was an English firm of merchants, shipbrokers, ship owners and insurance agents based in Newcastle upon Tyne.

The company was established in 1869 by two Danes, Counciller A.P. Andersen and Herman Ferdinand Nielsen, and operated in Newcastle upon Tyne and Blyth. Nielsen died in 1887 and by 1920 ownership had passed to Arthur Waldemar Carrall, James Vallans Haswell, Joseph William Atkinson and Kristian Host. The company was later incorporated with Companies House in 1920, but now operates as an investment company.

The company was actively shipping passengers and goods between at least the 1870s and 1970s. Between 1879 and the late 20th century they were agents for the United Steamship Company of Copenhagen/DFDS services between Newcastle upon Tyne and various ports in Denmark including Esbjerg. Other countries that they operated vessels to included Russia.

Throughout its history the company was based at a number of addresses near Newcastle Quayside including 2 King Street and 9/11/23 Queen Street in the Grade II listed Princes Buildings that were built in 1863 and designed by William Parnell.
