= Steeplecab =

Style of electric locomotive

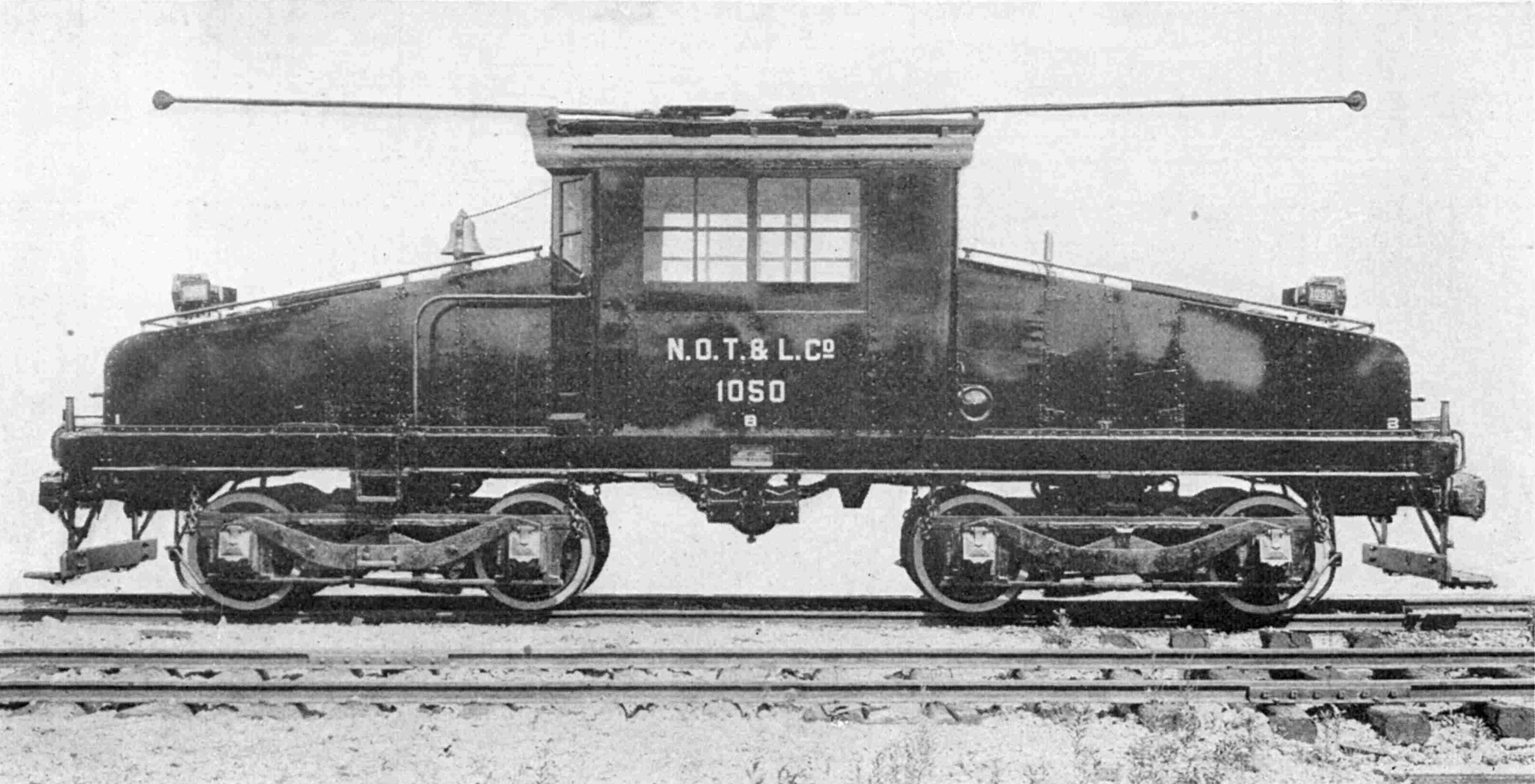
A GE steeplecab electric locomotive. This example is fitted with trolley poles for service on an interurban railroad.

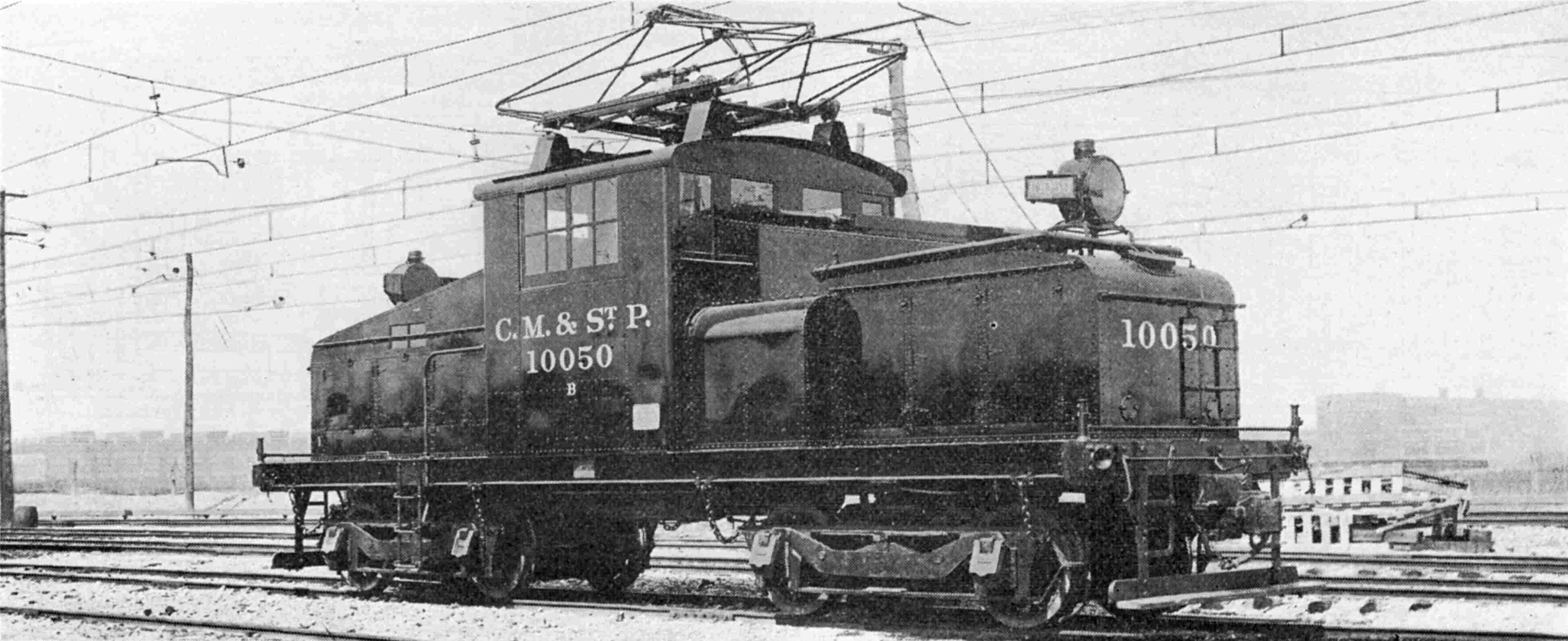
A Milwaukee Road class ES-2, an example of a larger steeplecab switcher locomotive for service on an electrified heavy-duty railroad.

Steeplecab is railroad terminology for a style or design of electric locomotive; the term is rarely if ever used for other forms of power. The name originated in North America and has been used in Britain as well.

A steeplecab design has a central driving cab area which may include a full-height area in between for electrical equipment. On both ends lower sloping hood contain other equipment, especially noisy equipment such as the air compressor not desired within the cab area. When overhead lines are used for power transmission, the cab roof usually supports the equipment to collect the power, either by pantographs, bow collectors or trolley poles. Although on some early designs such as the North Eastern Railways Electric No. 1 a bow collector might be mounted on one of the hoods instead.

== History ==
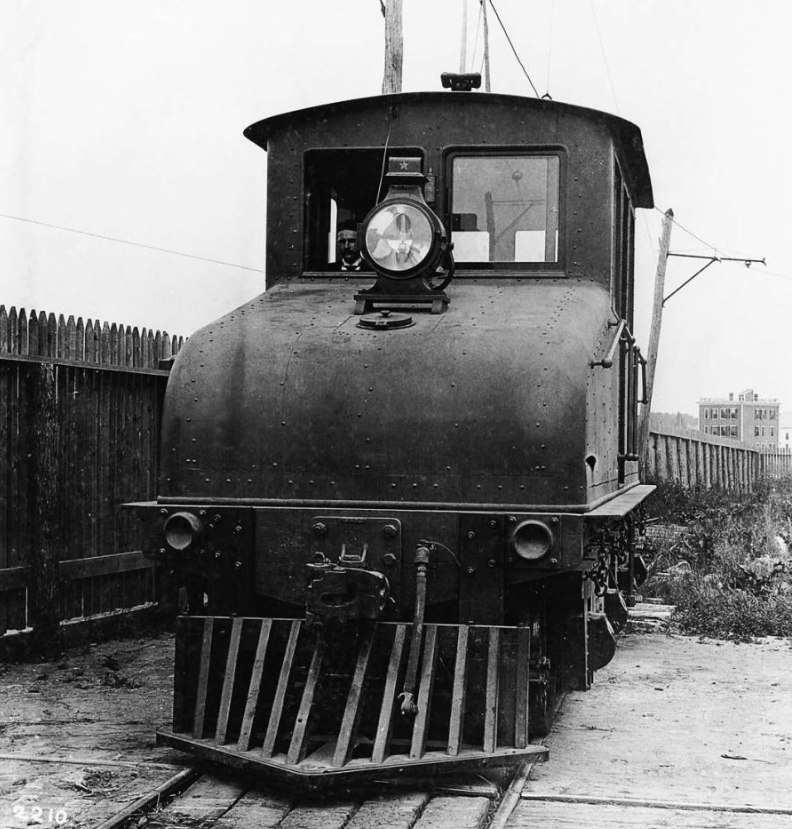
GE steeplecab Black Maria used in Taftville

The steeplecab style was developed in America. The first ever built steeple cab was a 30-ton model built by General Electric (GE) in 1894. It was used in a textile mill in Taftville, Connecticut till the mill closed in 1964. This was only the second electric locomotive built by GE and it is preserved as a static display in the Connecticut Trolley Museum.

GE received the contract to electrify the Howard Street Tunnel of the Baltimore Belt Line, what became the first main line electrification in the world. Operation of the system started 1895. The three locomotives used are sometimes referred to as steeple cabs, but they had a different design compared to the ordinary steeplecabs. Each locomotive consisted of two permanently coupled sections each riding on two axles. The overall silhouette was similar to a steeplecab.

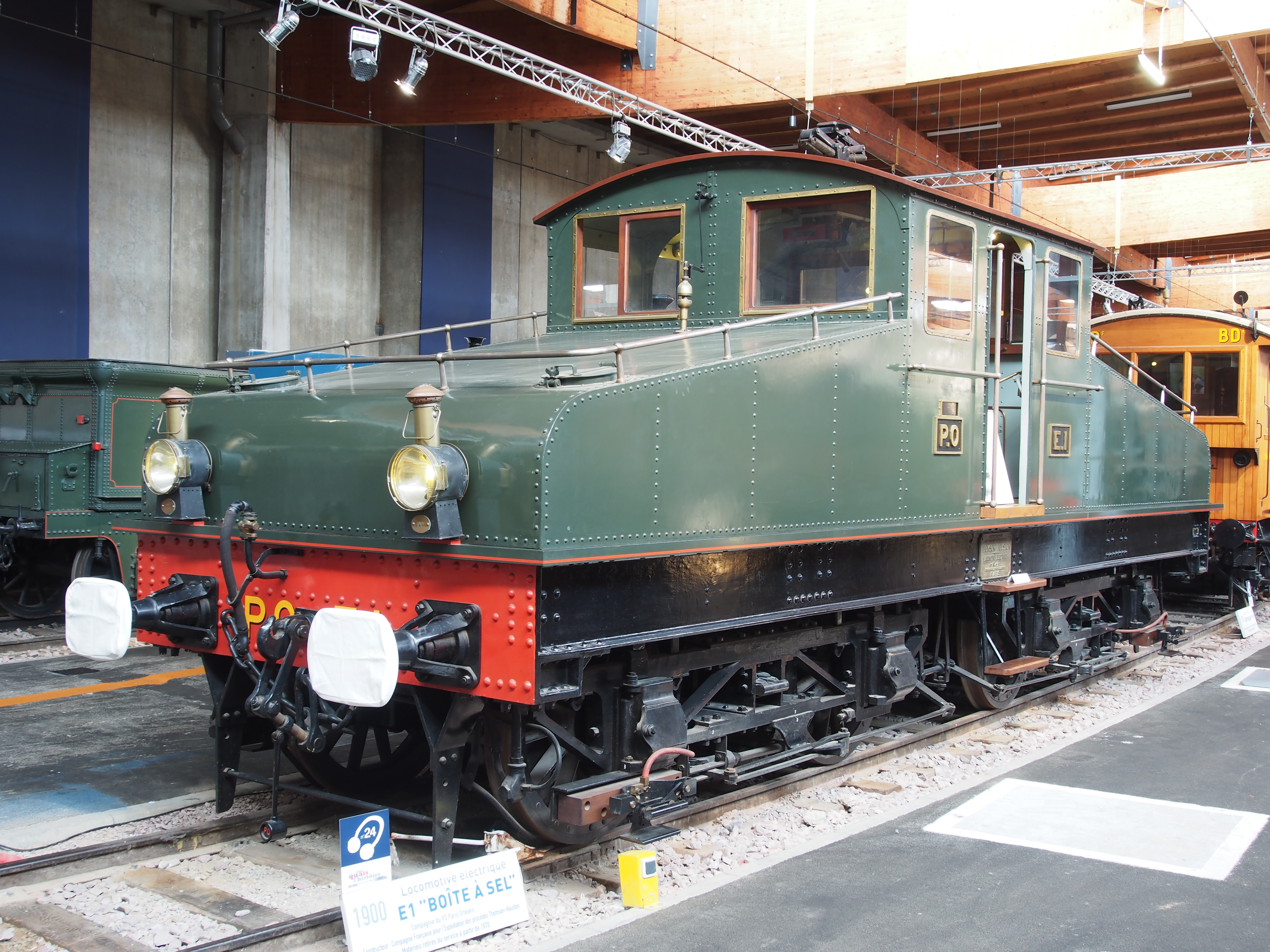
GE steeple cab use on the PO line in Paris, France

Following to the concept in Baltimore, the French Compagnie du chemin de fer de Paris à Orléans (PO) built a tunnel from its Gare d'Austerlitz to the new built Gare d'Orsay. This brought the railway terminus in Paris 2.5 miles closer to the city center. The tunnel was electrified with third rail power to avoid the nuisance of smoke from the steam locomotives. The system used at the beginning eight steeplecabs numbered E1 to E8 for traction. They were built by GE and the French Ateliers de Construction du Nord de la France (ANF), also known under its brand name Blanc-Misseron representing the rolling stock factory of the company. The locomotives remained with the successor company of PO, the SNCF, even the Gare d'Orsay closed for long-distance services in 1939. The SNCF used them as shunters till the end of the 1960s. One is preserved in the Cité du Train in Mulhouse.

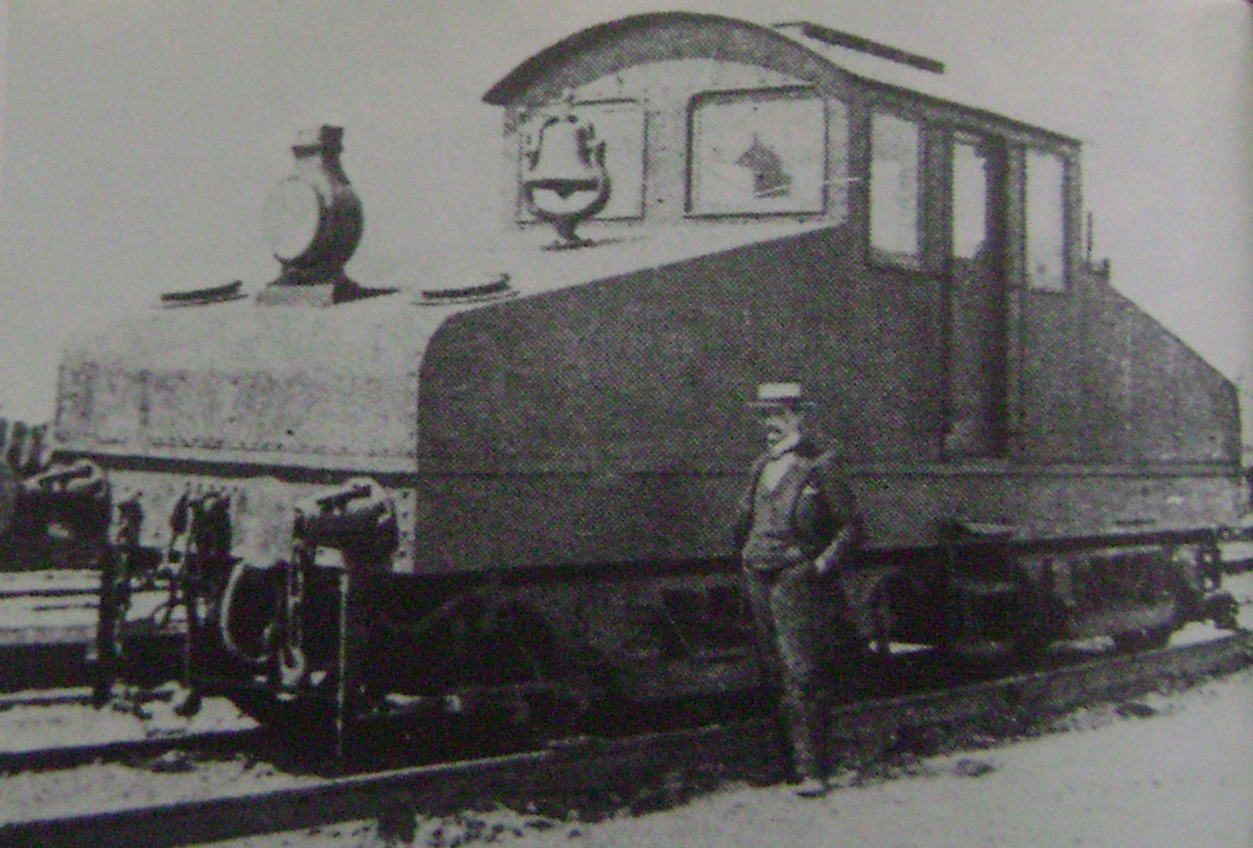
Locomotive delivered to the Varesina in Italy

Initially, nine locomotives were foreseen for the Paris operation of PO, but one of the ordered locomotives was given to Rete Mediterranea for freight service on the Porto Ceresio–Milan railway, which was also known as Varesina. The locomotive was built 1901 by Thomson-Houston and General Electric as 650 V DC 3rd rail locomotive like the ones in Paris. Originally classified as RM01, it became under FS the E420.001 and was transferred to Naples, where it was used for freight service on the Naples Subway. This line was later electrified with 3000 V and the locomotive was sold to the nearby Cumana railway, where it remained in service till 1963.

In 1902, the British North Eastern Railway placed an order for two steeplecab locomotives of virtually identical design, the ES1 (although they had a dual collection system, using both 3rd rail and pantograph) . These were for the Tyneside Electrics system in North East England, where their job was to haul very heavy mineral trains relatively short distances but over a route that included gradients as steep as 1 in 27. These locomotives started work in 1905 and were only retired in 1964. The North Shore Railroad in California built a standard gauge, steeplecab locomotive in its own shops in 1902-1903 which was used until 1906 when it was apparently sold to the United Railroads of San Francisco.

Steeplecabs are more often used for DC electrification, not AC. The first electric railways used DC supplies which could be fed directly to their traction motors, without needing much electrical equipment on board. AC electrification required either large frame-mounted motors, or rectifiers. AC locomotives thus used the boxcab or centercab layout, where their high bodywork provided space for the additional transformer, rectifiers and control equipment. A centercab, such as the PRR GG1, is similar to a steeplecab and has the same single central control cab with a view in both directions, but there is only vision to one side of the locomotive from each side of the cab, as the hoods are too high to see over.

The steeplecab locomotive was the most common design for freight locomotives used on interurbans. In North America, the market was dominated by General Electric and the consortium of Baldwin (BLW) and Westinghouse. The standard series were usually designated by the weight of the locomotive in tons. The heaviest ones weighed 100 ton, the lightest 30 ton, where the 50 ton and 60 ton models were the most common ones.

== Advantages and disadvantages ==
The steeplecab design was especially popular for electric switcher locomotives, and on electric locomotives ordered for interurban and industrial lines. It offers a large degree of crash protection for the crew combined with good visibility.

Disadvantages include reduced room for bulky electrical equipment compared to other designs.

The overall design pattern of a central crew area with lower and/or narrower equipment hoods on each end has been repeated many times, although the lack of equipment space has meant it has largely died out in recent years.

== By country ==
=== Australia ===
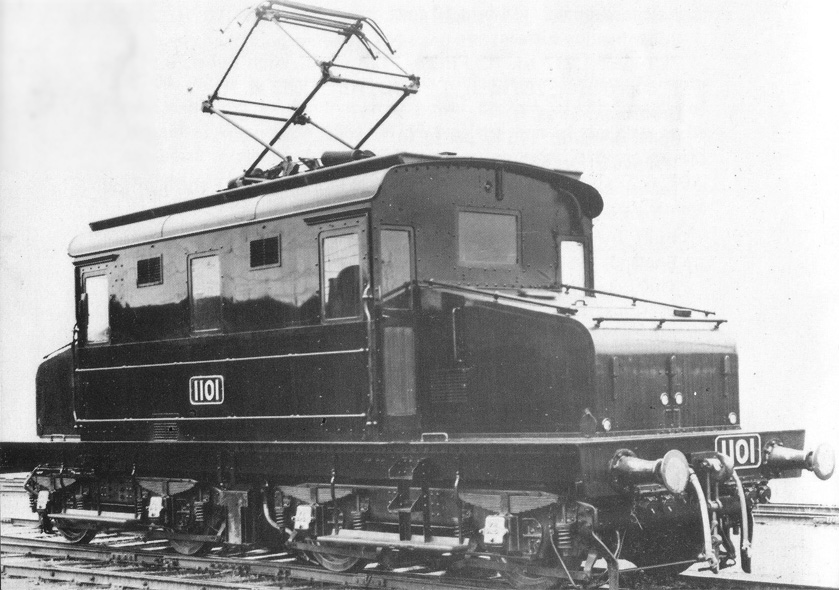
Victoria Railway E Class

The first two members of the Victorian Railways E class electric locomotives, introduced in 1923, were of a steeplecab design.

=== France ===
The Compagnie du chemin de fer de Paris à Orléans introduced eight steeplecab locomotives from General Electric used for an electrified tunnel ligne similar to the design of the Baltimore Belt Line in 1900.

=== Germany ===
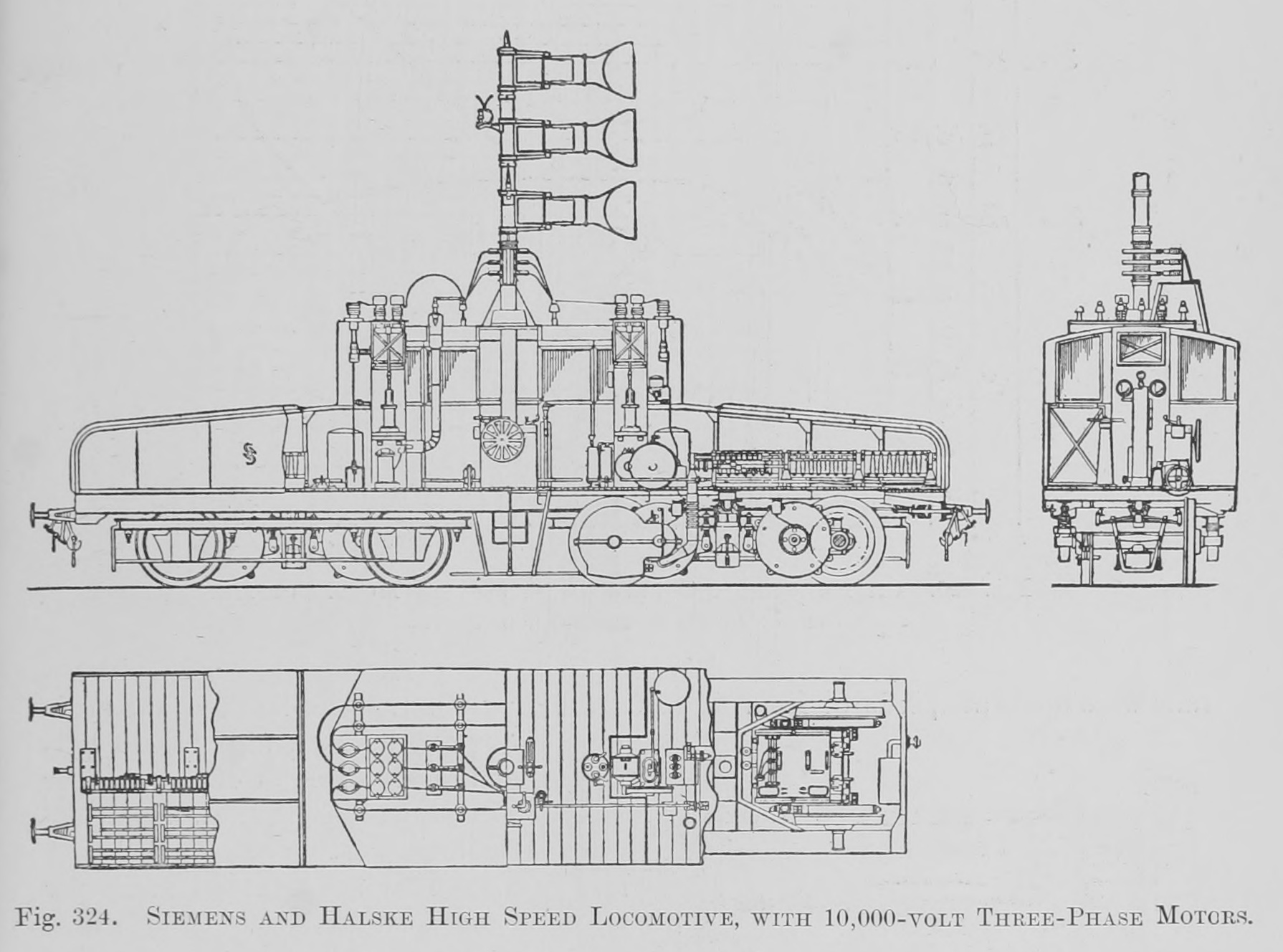
Experimental Siemens & Halske three-phase AC locomotive for high-speed trials.

Several early German electric locomotives were of the steeplecab design. This included a Siemens & Halske three-phase AC locomotive used for high-speed trials with 10 kV three-phase AC alongside the experimental three-phase railcar in 1901–3, the LAG 1 (later E69) of 1905, the narrow-gauge Saxonian I ME of 1911 or the DRG Class E170 of 1913.

=== Italy ===
A single locomotive was built in 1900 by Thomson-Houston and General Electric for the Ferrovie Nord Milano.

=== Japan ===
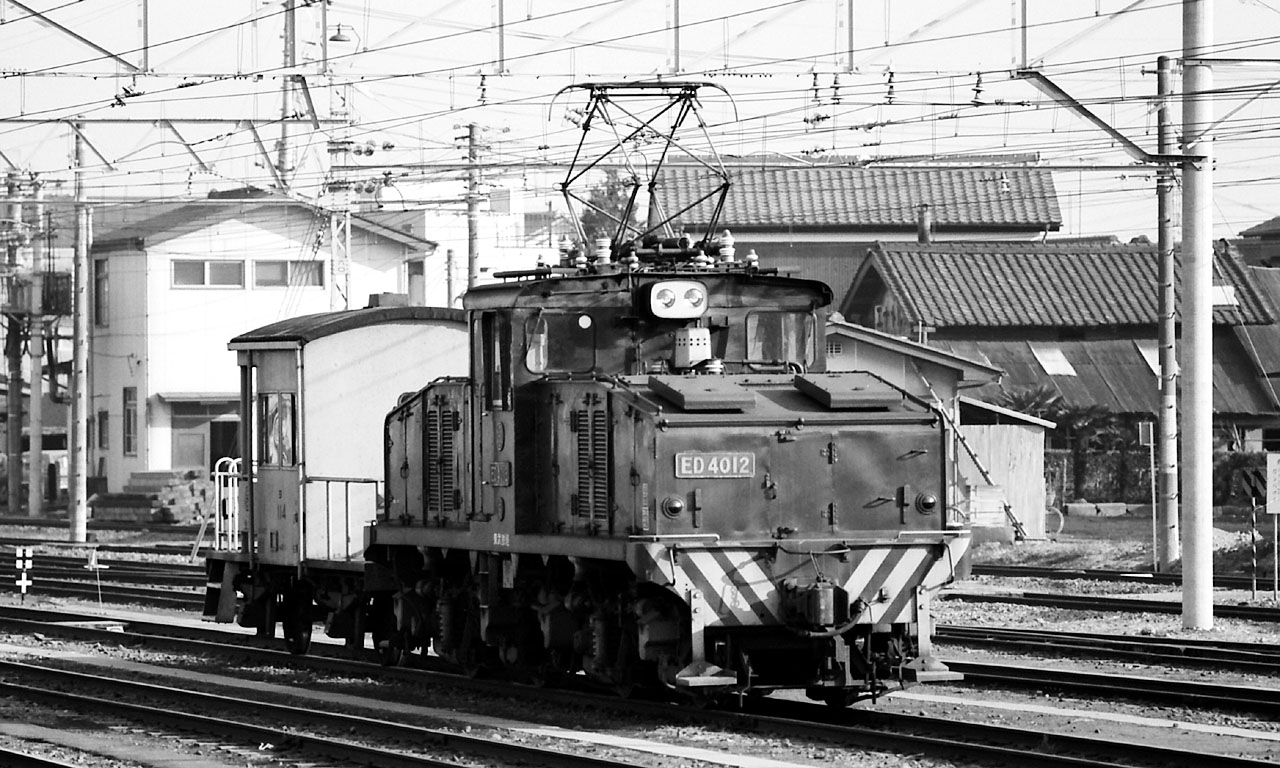
Tobu Class ED4010 electric locomotive ED4012 at Sugito Station, Japan

During World War II, Toshiba manufactured Toshiba austerity Electric locomotives (Japanese: 東芝戦時型電気機関車).

=== United Kingdom ===
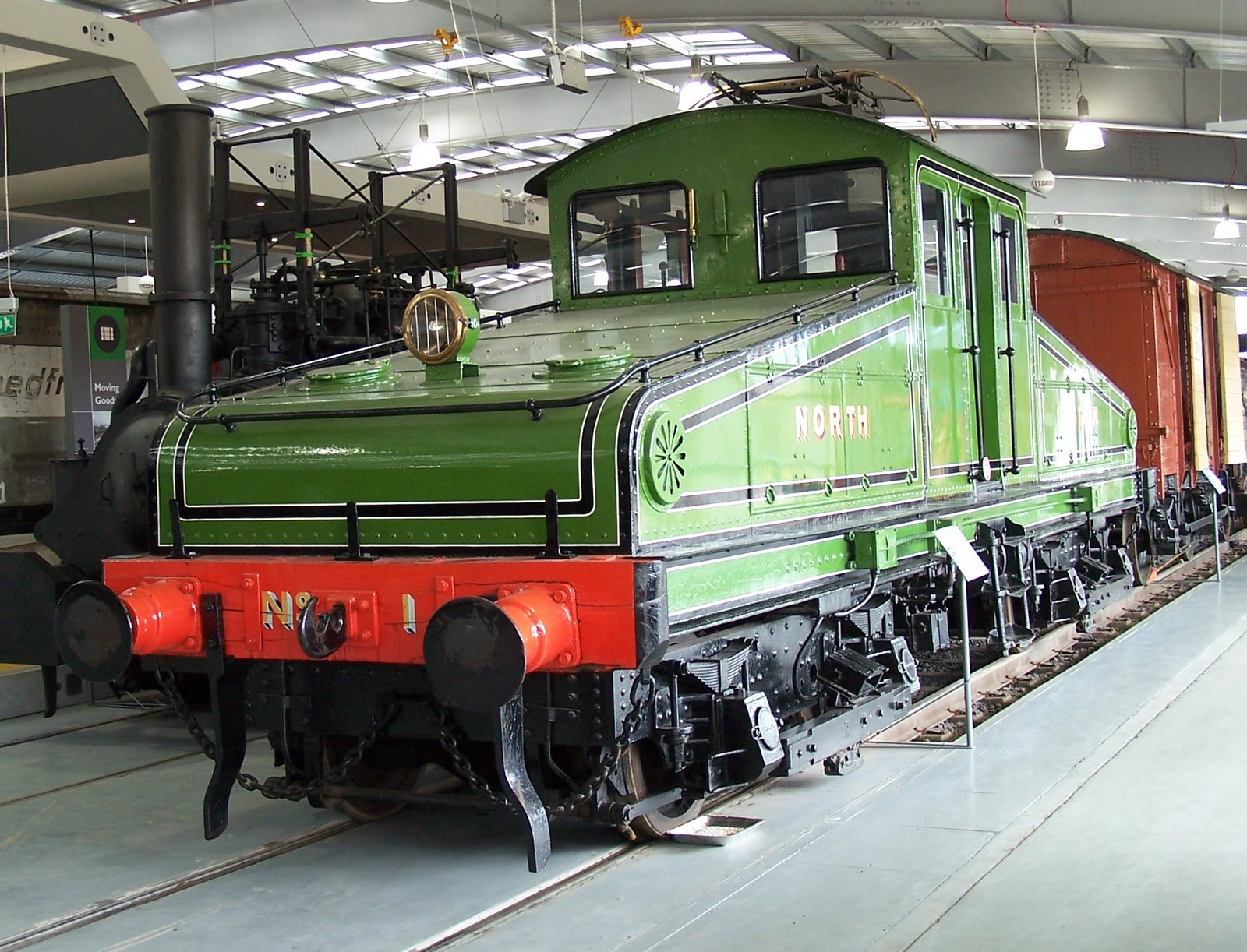
NER No.1 (later British Rail Class ES1), Locomotion museum, Shildon

When the Central London Railway (now the Central line of the London Underground) opened in 1900, its trains were hauled by camelback (steeplecab) electric locomotives. Due to severe vibrations as a result of their most of their weight being unsprung, they were withdrawn in 1903 and replaced by multiple-unit trains.

The North Eastern Railway operated three classes of camelbacks between 1905 and the company's merger under Grouping in 1922. These became:

- LNER Class EE1
- British Rail Class EF1
- LNER Class ES1

The Lancashire and Yorkshire Railway also built at least two steeplecab locomotives. One was a straight electric which could pick up current from third rail or overhead wire. The other was battery powered. See external links for photos.

=== United States ===
In the US, several examples of steeplecab electric locomotives can be found preserved at various railway museums. At least one common carrier railroad, the Iowa Traction, still operates several locomotives of this style.

- The Western Railway Museum features two former Sacramento Northern locomotives in its collection, both built by General Electric.
- The Southern California Railway Museum rosters several such locomotives, including one from the Sacramento Northern and a Yakima Valley Transportation Company locomotive that originally ran in Glendale, California.
- The Illinois Railway Museum rosters several locomotives from The Milwaukee Electric Railway and Light Company and the only surviving articulated steeplecab, originally from the Commonwealth Edison plant on California Avenue in Chicago.
- The New York Transit Museum has three preserved South Brooklyn Railway Steeplecab locomotives in its collection, at least one of which operated on fan trips during the subway's centennial in 2004.

== Similar designs ==
Other, similar, designs with cab position towards the center and hoods, some including very large locomotives:

- the "Crocodile" design used in Europe
- the PRR GG1
- the Milwaukee Road class EP-2 "Bi-Polars"
