= LNER Class ES1 =

Class of electric locomotive

North Eastern Railway Class ES1
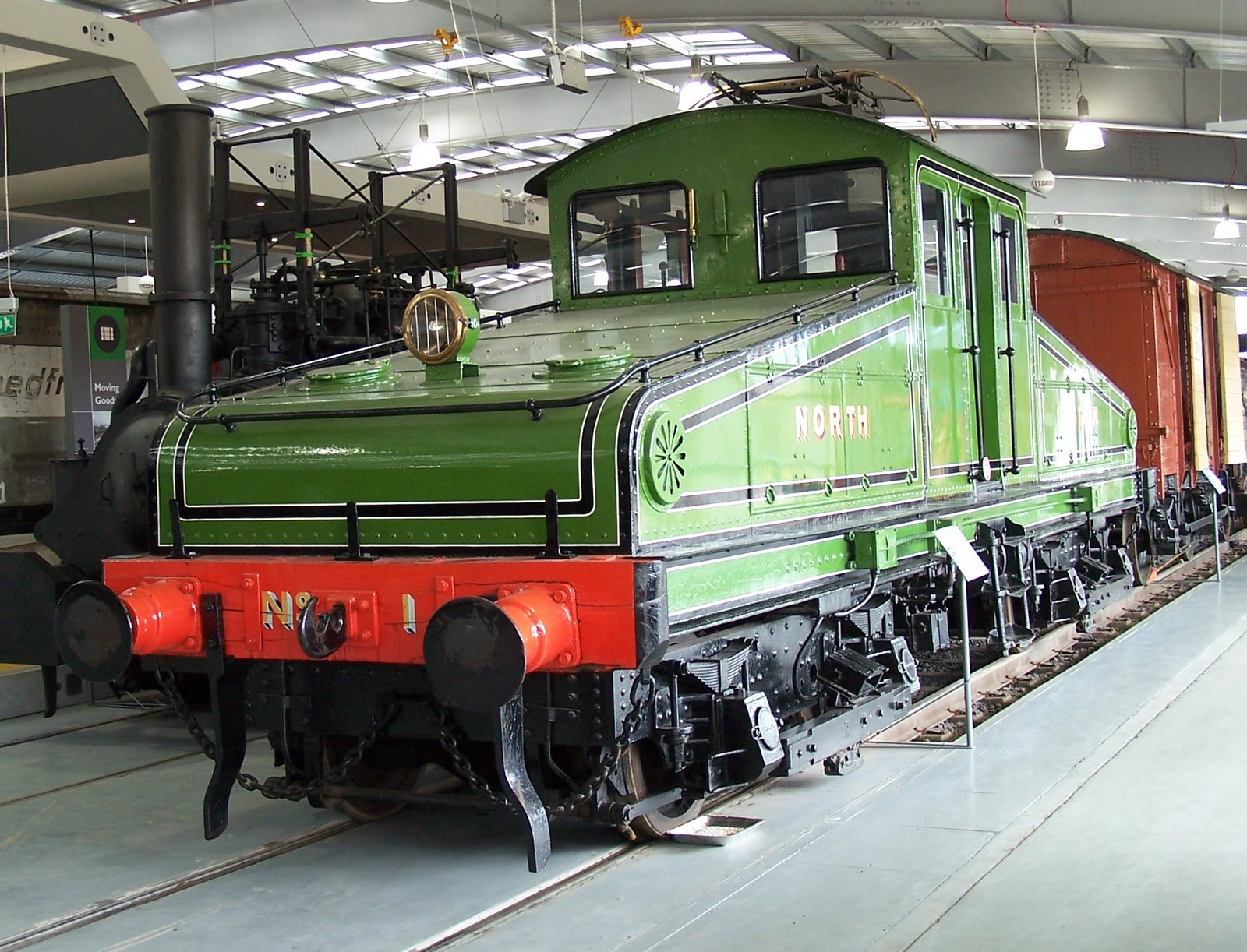
- NER No.1, Locomotion museum, Shildon
Type and origin
- Power type: Electric
- Builder: British Thomson-Houston, with mechanical parts sub-contracted to Brush, for North Eastern Railway
- Build date: 1903–1904 (contract signed with builders on 15 December 1902)
- Total produced: 2
Specifications
- Configuration
  - UIC: Bo′Bo′
  - Commonwealth: Bo-Bo
- Gauge: 4 ft 8 1/2 in (1,435 mm) standard gauge
- Wheel diameter: 3 ft 0 in (0.914 m)
- Wheelbase: 27 ft 0 in (8.230 m)
- Length: 37 ft 11 in (11.557 m)
- Height: Pantograph lowered: 12 ft 11 in (3.937 m); Pantograph raised: 15 ft 9 in (4.801 m)
- Loco weight: 56 long tons (57 tonnes; 63 short tons)
- Electric system/s: 600–630 V DC, Third rail or catenary
- Current pickup: Contact shoe or pantograph
- Traction motors: British Thomson-Houston, 4 off
- Train heating: None
Performance figures
- Maximum speed: 27 mph (43 km/h)
- Power output: 640 bhp (477 kW)
- Tractive effort: 25,000 lbf (111.2 kN); 335 t (330 long tons; 369 short tons) @ 14 mph (23 km/h)
Career
- Operators: North Eastern Railway; London and North Eastern Railway; British Railways
- Numbers: NER: 1–2; LNER 1–2, later 6480–6481; BR: 26500–26501
- Axle load class: Route availability 2
- First run: 1905
- Retired: 1964
- Disposition: No. 1 preserved, No. 2 scrapped in 1966

The NER Class ES1 (Electric Shunting 1) was a class of two steeplecab electric locomotives commissioned by the North Eastern Railway in 1902.

Both locomotives passed to the London and North Eastern Railway in 1923 and then to British Railways in 1948, but both were withdrawn before TOPS numbers could be applied.

== History ==
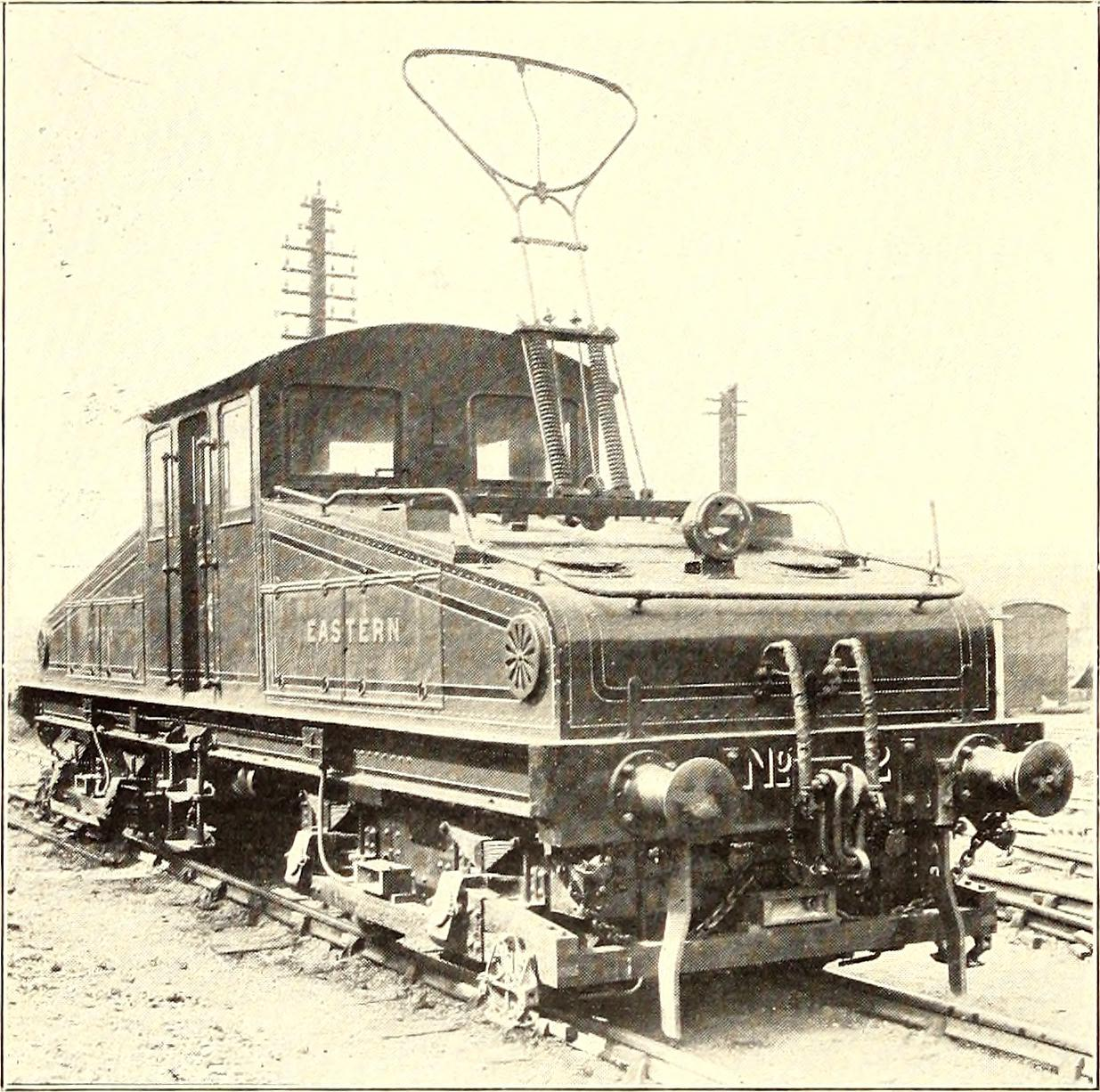
As built, with the original bow collector

The North Eastern Railway was an enthusiastic and relatively early adopter of electric traction for railways. As part of a 1902 scheme to electrify the suburban railway networks in the Tyneside area, the NER's Chief Mechanical Engineer, Wilson Worsdell, also wished to electrify the Newcastle Quayside Branch; a 3/4-mile (1.2 km), horseshoe-shaped freight line that went from Trafalgar Yard in Manors to Newcastle Quayside Yard. Passing through three tunnels, this line had gradients as steep as 1:27 (3.70 %) and a number of sharp curves: it presented a formidable challenge for steam traction. Working conditions inside the tunnels were atrocious because the locomotives had to work exceptionally hard to manage the gradients which meant they produced vast quantities of choking fumes that could not disperse from the tunnels; the sparks they produced were a constant fire risk to the flammable packing materials in the yards. Electrification was the obvious answer.

The specification for new electric locomotives demanded that they be able to start a train of 150 tons on the steepest gradient, while on the level they were expected to be able to haul 300 long tons (305 t; 336 short tons) at 14 mph (23 km/h). The end-to-end journey on the branch was to be completed in 4.5 minutes.

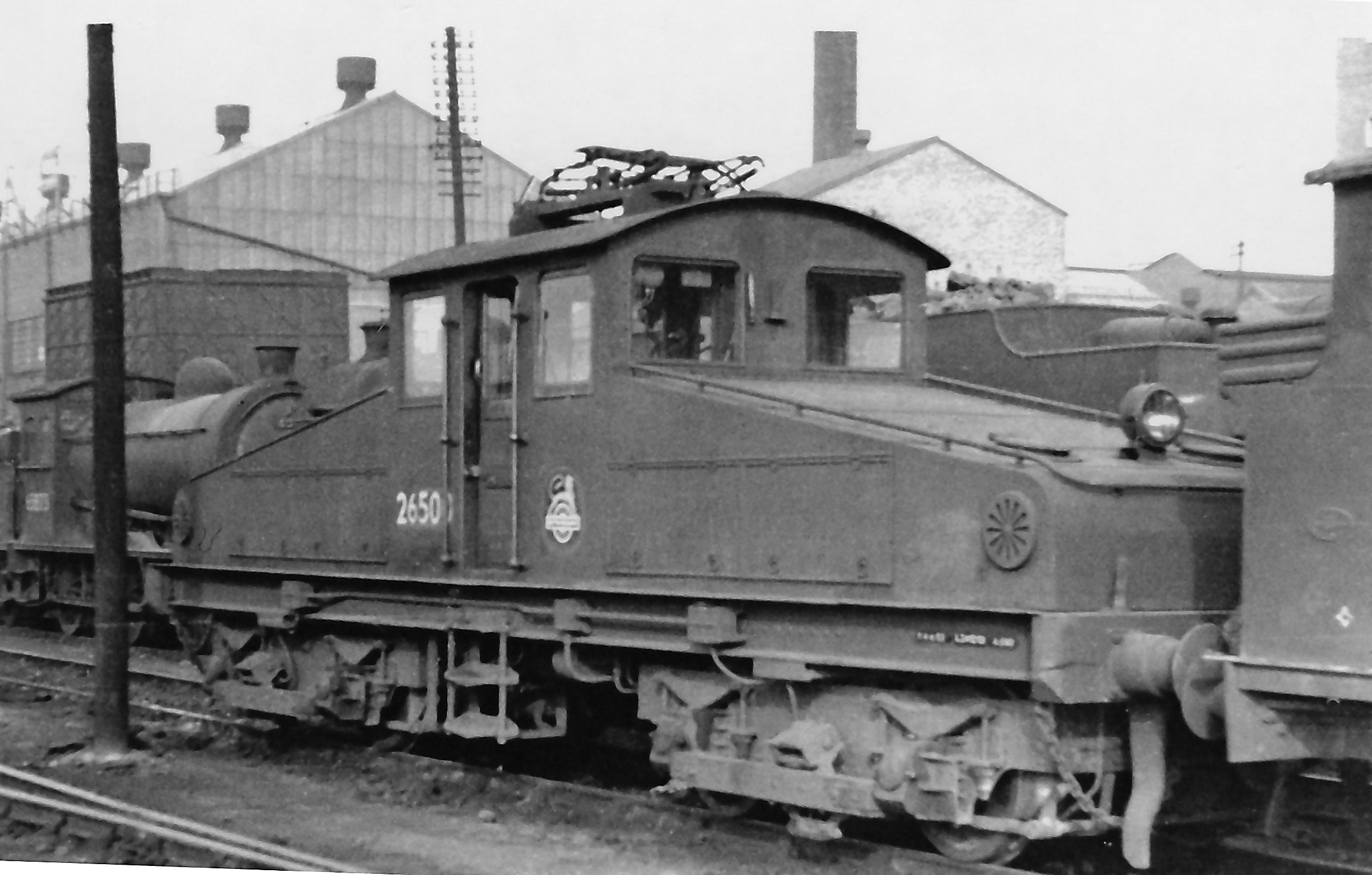
No. 26500 at Heaton Locomotive Depot in 1954

In 1900, General Electric (GE) and Thomson-Houston designed and built steeplecab-type locomotive for the Milan-Varese railway in Italy, electrified at 650 V DC using the third rail system. That railway opened in 1901, and the locomotive design proved successful. The North Eastern Railway's ES1s were derived from that American design, although they were designed from the start for both third rail and overhead operation: the Newcastle Quay branch used both systems—third rail in the tunnels, and overhead lines on the rest of the line.

A contract was signed with the British Thomson-Houston company on 15 December 1902, for delivery by the end of the following year. British Thomson-Houston sub-contracted the mechanical parts to Brush Electrical Engineering Co.

The electrified line was operational from 5 June 1905, and in the following year both locomotives performed exceptionally well. In 1906, they were fitted with electric heaters, the men having complained they were too cold on wintry mornings. A few years later, the bow collectors originally fitted on their bonnets were removed and a pantograph installed on the roof instead. With few other changes, they remained in operation until the line was de-electrified and they were replaced with diesel locomotives on 29 February 1964. The line was closed five years later.

Early photographs show the locomotives with "CLASS ELECTRIC 1" painted on the bufferbeams, but this does not appear in official records. In common with other LNER electric locomotives, no classification was given to these locomotives until 4 October 1945, when Nos. 1 and 2 were classified ES1 (Electric Shunting 1). No. 1 exchanged numbers with Class D3 steam locomotive No. 4075 on 30 September 1944, but after the steam locomotive was again renumbered (to no. 2000), the electric locomotive was able to resume its original number on 24 October 1944. On 14 June 1946, Nos. 1 and 2 were renumbered to 6480/1; and under British Railways, they became Nos. 26500/1 in April 1948.

== Preservation ==
From 1968, ES1 (number 26500 under British Rail's number scheme) was transferred to Leicester Railway Museum. After that closed, in 1977 it was taken into the National Collection of the National Railway Museum, and is currently on display at Locomotion, Shildon.

== See also ==
- SNCF BB 1280, contemporary design, originally built for the Compagnie du chemin de fer de Paris à Orléans, also deriving from GE design

== Sources ==
- The LNER Encyclopaedia on the ES 1
- Hoole, K. (1988). The Electric Locomotives of the North Eastern Railway. Headington: Oakwood Press. ISBN 0-85361-367-2. Locomotion Papers LP167.
- Boddy, M.G.; Fry, E.V.; Hennigan, W.; Hoole, Ken; Mallaband, Peter; Neve, E.; Price, J.H.; Proud, P.; Yeadon, W.B. (April 1990). Fry, E.V. (ed.). Locomotives of the L.N.E.R., part 10B: Railcars and Electric Stock. Lincoln: RCTS. ISBN 0-901115-66-5.
