= SNCF BB 1280 =

PO E 1-13, later PO E 281-293 SNCF BB 1280
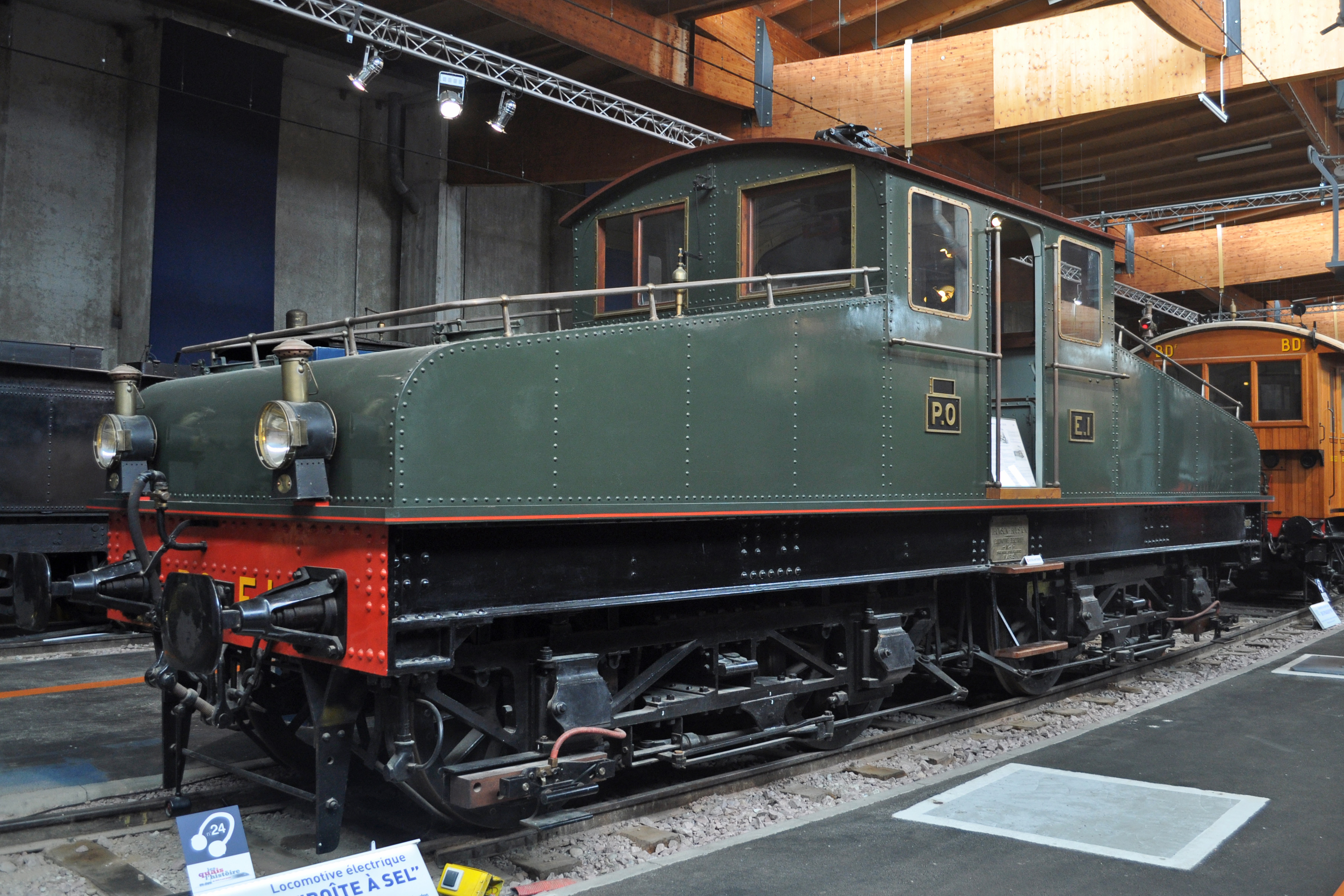
- PO E.1 (preserved at Mulhouse railway museum, 2012) (Note: The locomotive preserved was formerly BB1283, ex- PO E.2)
Type and origin
- Power type: Electric
- Builder: General Electric/Blanc-Misseron
- Build date: E.1 to E.8 : 1900-1904; E.9 to E.13 : 1905-1912
- Total produced: 13
- Rebuild date: 1930-5
Specifications
- Configuration
  - UIC: Bo′Bo′
- Gauge: 1,435 mm (4 ft 8 1/2 in)
- Wheelbase: 2.388 m (7 ft 10.0 in) (bogie)
- Length: 10.609 m (34 ft 9.7 in)¤ 11.371 m (37 ft 3.7 in)‡
- Loco weight: 50 t (49 long tons; 55 short tons)*, 60 t (59 long tons; 66 short tons)*¶ 54.6 t (53.7 long tons; 60.2 short tons)‡, 64 t (63 long tons; 71 short tons)‡¶
- Electric system/s: 600 V DC third rail* 1500 V DC Catenary†
- Current pickup(s): third rail / mini-pantograph Pantograph†
- Traction motors: four GE motors
- Transmission: series/parallel switching, rheostatic control, under 1500 V metadyne control
- MU working: second series only (E.9 to E.13)‡
Performance figures
- Maximum speed: 70 km/h (43 mph)*, later 100 km/h (62 mph)*‡ 50 km/h (31 mph)¶
- Power output: 680 kW (910 hp) / 500 kW (670 hp) (hourly / continuous); 140 kW (190 hp) / 103 kW (138 hp) (hourly / continuous)¶
Career
- Operators: Compagnie du chemin de fer de Paris à Orléans, later SNCF
- Class: PO E.1 to 13; PO E.281-293 (1500 V versions); SNCF BB 280-293; SNCF BB 1280-1293 (after 1949)
- Nicknames: Boîte à sel (Salt cellars)
- Compagnie du chemin de fer de Paris à Orléans units † 1500 V rebuilt units ¤ data for PO E.1 to E.8 ‡ data for PO E.9 to E.13 ¶ data for versions converted for shunting Sources: technical: road numbers: others where noted

The SNCF BB 1280 class were a class of 600 V DC 4 axle Bo′Bo′ electric locomotives, formerly Compagnie du chemin de fer de Paris à Orléans machines (originally PO E.1 to E.13), initially built for an underground section of line connecting the Gare d'Austerlitz to the Quai d'Orsay in inner Paris. The locomotives were converted for 1500 V DC use in the 1930s, and renumbered PO E.281 to E.293. They were absorbed by the SNCF, and operated as shunters until the late 1960s.

== History ==
At the end of the 19th century the Compagnie du chemin de fer de Paris à Orléans (PO) was seeking to extend its railway into a more central location in Paris: an extension from the Gare de Austerlitz to the new Gare du Quai d'Orsay was constructed, including covered sections; the new section was similar to the recently constructed Baltimore Belt Line (USA), constructed by the Baltimore and Ohio Railroad (B&O) and operated by electric locomotives built by General Electric, which had worked well, and achieved speeds of 80 km/h.

Eight locomotives were ordered for the new line, delivered between 1900 and 1904, numbered E1 to E8, with electrical equipment from GE, and mechanical equipment and structural parts manufactured by Blanc-Misseron. The line was electrified by 600 V DC, supplied by a third rail, with overhead collection via a mini-pantograph in the Orsay tunnel. Unlike the B&O locomotives the PO units used geared drive, rather than the co-axial gearless motor drive of the 1896 B&O machines.

Locomotive E.1 was exhibited at the 1900 Exposition Universelle in Paris.

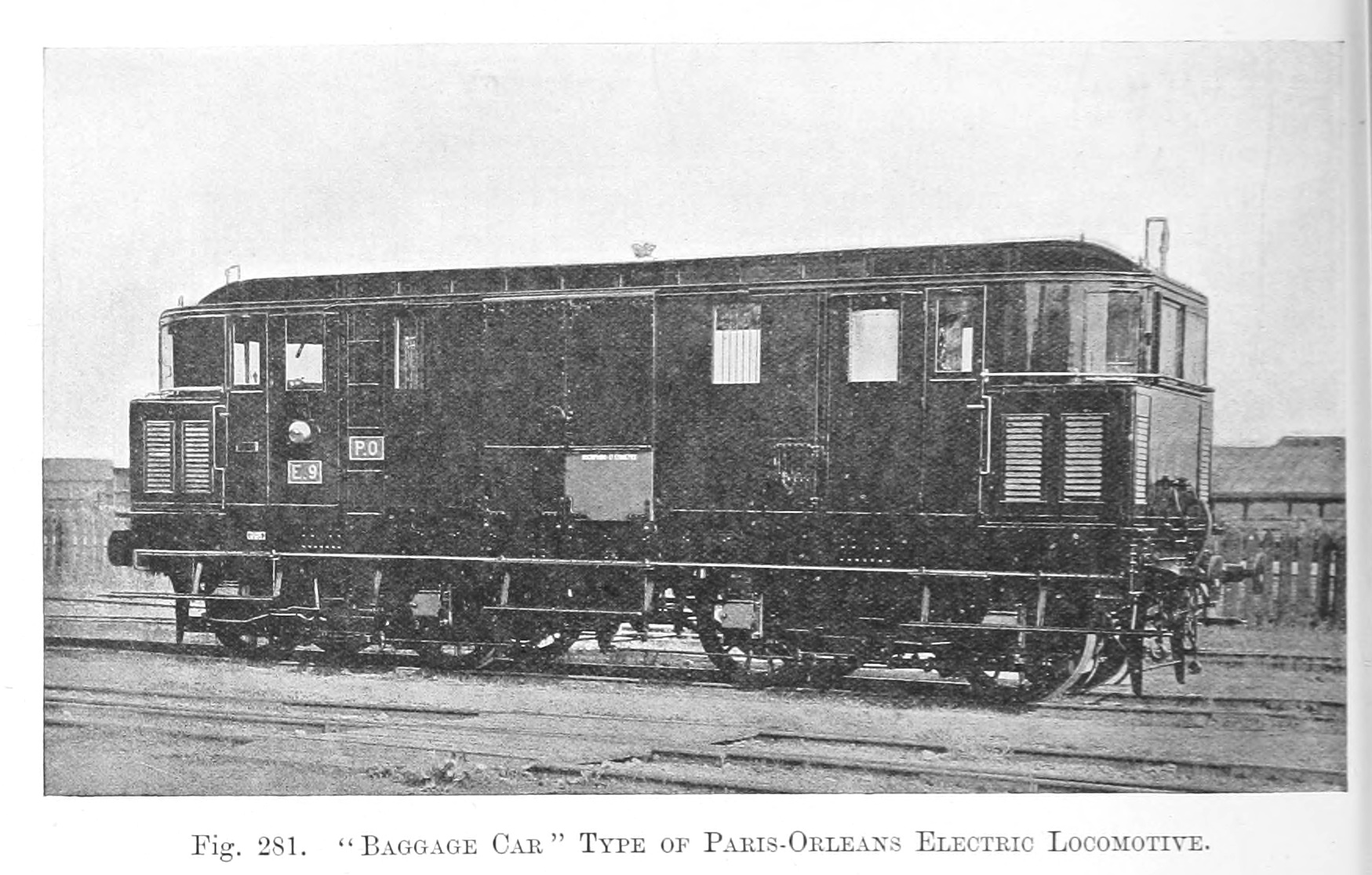
Paris & Orleans twin cab 'baggage car' variant

The first eight units were a single cab steeplecab design. Further units were acquired as the system's electrification spread beyond the initial Orsay-Austerlitz line; five units were acquired, with a twin cab design, with a baggage compartment (locomotives-fourgon). (Note: During the Second World War number 1292 (ex-PO E.12) was damaged and rebuilt as a single cab machine.)

In service the locomotives were used throughout the PO system where electrified; the initial specifications of the design, matching those used for the tunnel shuttle service on the Baltimore Belt Line were too low geared for the general network, and in 1904 seven locomotives were upgeared and the top speed raised to 100 km/h. (Note: Unit E.1 was not upgeared, being assigned to shunting work in Orsay.) (Note: The original gear ratio was 4.1 (79 to 18) reduction, this was reduced to a 2.23 reduction gearing for higher speed. The locomotives supplied after the original eight had a 2.23 ratio as built.)

In the late 1920s/1930s 1500 V DC began to be used on the PO rail system; the locomotives were converted for 1500 V operation at workshops at Vitry-sur-Seine using a Metadyne for traction control. A new pantograph as well as sand boxes were added. After conversion the class were renumbered E.281 to E.293. (Note: Renumbering was did not preserve number order.) During the second half of the units operational life they were used for shunting at depots to the southwest of Paris.

In 1949 the units were renumbered BB 1280 to BB 1293 as part of the SNCF. The class were withdrawn between 1965-7.

One unit, numbered E.1 is preserved at the Musée français du chemin de fer in Mulhouse.

== Models ==
Tin plate version of the locomotive were manufactured by Maerklin in Gauge I, and by Bing, LR, and Jouet de Paris (Jep) in Gauge 0.

Kit versions have been produced by Maison des Trains, Pullman, RMCF Keyser, and Apogée Vapeur in HO scale.

== See also ==
- LNER Class ES1, steeplecab electric locomotive originally built for the North Eastern Railway, also derived from the GE design
