= Tyne Theatre and Opera House =

Theatre in Newcastle upon Tyne, England

Coordinates: 54.970486°N 1.621010°W

- Mill Volvo Tyne Theatre, The Journal Tyne Theatre; Tyne Theatre; Newcastle Opera House; Stoll Picture House
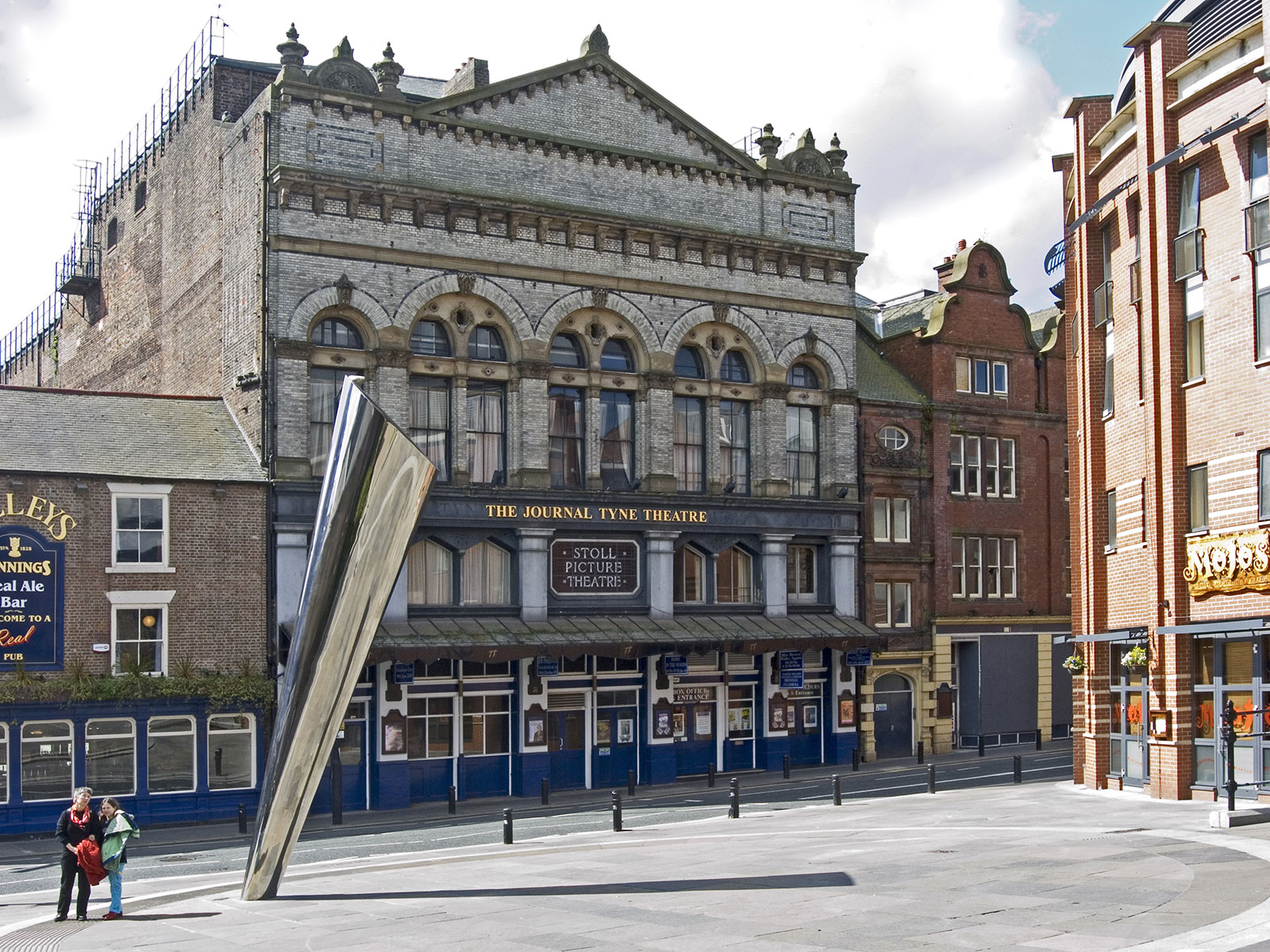
- Interactive map of Tyne Theatre and Opera House
- Address: Westgate Road; Newcastle upon Tyne; England, UK
- Owner: Tyne Theatre and Opera House Preservation Trust
- Capacity: 1,100
- Current use: Theatre

Construction
- Opened: 23 September 1867
- Architect: William Parnell

Website
- http://www.tynetheatreandoperahouse.uk/

The Tyne Theatre and Opera House is a theatre in Newcastle upon Tyne, England. It is a Grade I listed building, rated "in the top 4% of listed buildings" by English Heritage and is afforded a three star (the highest) rating by the Theatres Trust, "a very fine theatre of the highest theatrical and architectural quality". It opened in 1867 as the Tyne Theatre and Opera House, designed by the Newcastle upon Tyne architecture practice of William Parnell. The backstage area was damaged by fire in 1985, with subsequent rebuilding restoring the Victorian stage machinery.

The importance of the architectural and theatrical heritage of the building is also recognised by The Associated of Historic Theatres in Europe and OISTAT (the International Organisation of Scenographers, Theatre Technicians and Architects).

== Brief history ==
It opened in 1867 as the Tyne Theatre and Opera House, designed by the Newcastle upon Tyne architecture practice of William Parnell.

In 1919 it became a cinema, the Stoll Picture House, the name which can still be seen on the building front and side. The cinema closed in March 1974 and the building was closed for 3 years, reopening as a theatre in July 1977. It was damaged by a backstage fire in 1985, with subsequent rebuilding restoring the Victorian stage machinery.

The theatre has changed hands and management many times. From 2012 to 2014 it was called the Mill Volvo Tyne Theatre, operated by SMG Europe, and sponsored by Volvo. It was sponsored by The Journal newspaper during the 2000s, until January 2012.

Now the theatre is run by an independent Limited Company Tyne Theatre & Opera House Ltd, which is a subsidiary of the Tyne Theatre & Opera House Preservation Trust. The theatre is a charity and all funds raised by both the Preservation Trust and the Operational Company are used to preserve the building.

== The Building ==
One of only eight Grade One listed original theatres in Great Britain, the theatre is also the only one that dates to the Victorian period. The north part of the building is located within the boundary of the Hadrian's Wall World Heritage Site.

Stage and understage

The stage represents perhaps the most complete working example of the English wood stage - possessing four bridges, eight sloats, one carpet cut, two corner traps, three warm thrappled wing shafts, two staircase traps, three object traps and one grave trap. Overhead there is a series of drum and shaft mechanisms to operate synchronized scene-changes, and a hemp fly floor stage left with drum and shaft for the act drop.

A surviving example of early stage machinery. Deep stage with five sets of tabs, machinery and control panel. Complete switchboard for earliest electric lighting. Very deep and high backstage, dressing and ancillary rooms with many period features.

Facade

Italianate front of three storeys, five bays (the outer bays narrower) in pale brick with stone dressings. Stone cornice with long brackets, tall parapet and pediment over; small semi-circular pediments, flanked by urns, at sides. Arcaded second floor Ground floor modernised, Lozenge or pointed first floor window. Painted advertisement on left return gable: THE/STOLL/TYNESIDE'S/TALKIE/THEATRE.

Auditorium

Interior Horse-shoe shaped auditorium with three tiers of balconies on cast iron columns with floral capitals and long cantilever brackets. Balconies S-curved with thick applied baroque decoration. One set of boxes at either side framed in Orders below and by two large female terms at top stage. Shell-shaped ceiling and very high proscenium arch.

== Opening and early years ==
The Tyne Theatre & Opera House originally opened on Monday 23 September 1867 and was designed by William Parnell for Joseph Cowen (1829-1900), politician and industrialist, and son of Sir Joseph Cowen, a prominent citizen and Member of Parliament for Newcastle upon Tyne from 1865 to 1873. Money for the construction and no doubt materials for the theatre came from the family business, the Blaydon Brickworks, four miles west of Newcastle.

The original design was to house a stock company (producing theatre company) managed by George Stanley who successfully staged locally produced drama, opera, musical spectacles and pantomimes from 1867 until 1881. By the 1880s improvements in railway communications made touring productions more available and local productions of drama and opera were unable to compete with star vehicles from London. The second lessee of the Tyne Theatre & Opera House was Richard William Younge who managed the theatre from 1881 to 1887.

When Younge died in June 1887, Augustus Henry Glossop Harris, well known for being the manager and lessee of the Theatre Royal in Drury Lane, took over the lease of the Tyne Theatre & Opera House. Harris had very successfully run the Theatre Royal in Drury Lane, London since 1879 and has been referred to as the ‘Father of modern Pantomime’. Harris was knighted in 1891.

It was under his and especially the productive joint lease with Frederick WP Wyndham and James Brown Howard, headquartered in Edinburgh, who had been running the Theatre Royal, Newcastle, that the majority of the late 19th century alterations to the theatre were carried out. The buildings that currently house the Bistro Bar and the shops to the West of the theatre were added at this time creating a Grand Salon for entrance to the stalls and circle seating.

Following the partnership of Wyndham and Howard the newly formed Howard & Wyndham Ltd, created by Michael Simons of Glasgow in 1895 took over the lease. These partnerships with larger groups brought major stars and spectacularly staged productions to the theatre.

== The Cinema Years ==
The changing market for theatre during the First World War and the growing popularity of the movies brought about the closure of the theatre in 1917.

The theatre was leased by Sir Oswald Stoll and converted for cinema use by 1919 (following on from some experimentation in 1916 by Howard & Wyndham). There were already six cinemas in Newcastle by the time the Theatre was converted to a picture house. The Stoll Picture Theatre opened on 2 June 1919 with an opening presentation of ‘Tarzan of the Apes’. The Stoll Picture Theatre was the first cinema in Newcastle to show ‘talkies’. The conversion, unlike that of many other theatres around the country was minimal.

The theatre machinery was left in situ and the key changes at this time included the construction of a projector box at Upper Circle level, a cinema screen over the stage and alterations to the entrances of the building. The conversion was carried out by the office of Frank Matcham & Co., prominent theatre architects in London.

The theatre thrived as a cinema through four decades but due to a rise in the popularity of television, the number of people going to the cinema declined during the 1960s and the Stoll cinema attempted to counter this by cornering a select market showing ‘X’ rated films. This did not help maintain the cinema and it closed on 23 March 1974 after a bill of ‘Danish Bed and Board’.

== The New Tyne Theatre ==
The Stoll cinema remained closed for three years, during which time a ‘Save the Stoll’ campaign had been started by Mr Jack Dixon. A protection order was placed on the building in 1974 and was the first step for the Tyne Theatre Preservation Group. In 1976, the Stoll Theatre Corporation agreed to lease the theatre to the Tyne Theatre Trust for 28 years.

It was during the closure of the theatre and exploration of the building that the original 1867 stage machinery was discovered in situ and intact, along with the stage sets from the last show performed – all simply concealed behind the inserted cinema screen. The New Tyne Theatre and Opera House Company Limited was formed as an independent registered charity with the aim to restore and reopen the theatre for stage performances.

In 1980, the Company made an offer to purchase the theatre and the surrounding property from the Stoll Corporation and the offer was accepted. The Trust first acquired the lease of the adjacent public house and then proceeded to purchase the entire block comprising 5 shops, 2 public houses, a restaurant, offices and six flats. The investment was seen as an endowment fund for the ongoing running of the theatre.

One of the most memorable performances for the Tyne Theatre & Opera House following its restoration in the 1970s was in the return of opera to the theatre with Tosca on the evening of 6 May 1983, with Plácido Domingo as the lead. The Northern Sinfonia of England filled the orchestra pit and was conducted by Robin Stapleton. At this time, the Bistro Bar was renamed ‘Tosca’s’.

== Grade 1 Listing, the fire and after ==
In August 1985, the Tyne Theatre & Opera House was upgraded from a Grade II* listing to Grade I.

On 25 December 1985 there was a fire in the backstage area of the theatre, which destroyed the flytower. Following the fire, on 14 January 1986, a strong wind caused the remaining standing wall of the flytower to fall through the stage, damaging the Victorian wooden stage machinery and stage. Fortunately, work had been suspended on site that day due to the wind. Prior to this, the stage machinery was largely intact. Miraculously, the task of rebuilding began almost immediately under the direction of Mr Jack Dixon, who was responsible for organising the original restoration programme in 1977.

With the insurance money, the Company set about replacing the damaged structure and refurbishing the auditorium to a higher standard than had previously been possible. Works included a new roof, further dressing rooms and rehearsal rooms. By November 1986, less than a year after the fire, the theatre was reopened and its stage machinery operational again, reusing as much as could be salvaged from the fire. This was only 11 months after the fire and work had been completed for a total cost of £1.5million.

In 1987, Northern Arts helped broker a deal where the Tyne and Wear Theatre Company, then based at the Playhouse Theatre, was moved to the Tyne Theatre & Opera House and towards the end of this year, they had signed short term lease on the building. Unfortunately, this arrangement was short-lived and by 1989, the New Tyne Theatre and Opera House Company Limited was in a difficult position financially.

In the search for a financial solution to keep the theatre running, the Company looked to its property interests and also went into partnership with the local College of Technology (now Newcastle College) to establish a centre for performing arts within Waterloo House to the south of the theatre. The City Council and other interested parties intended to create a national centre of excellence in the performing arts – based around the theatre.

Unfortunately accumulating debts forced the New Tyne Theatre and Opera House Company into administration in 1995. The Tyne Theatre & Opera House was purchased by Mr Karl Watkin for £650,000 on 7 December 1995. He planned to use the theatre as a national base for the D’Oyly Carte Opera Company (it was later found to be unobtainable) and to create a centre of excellence for lyric theatre. During the time of his ownership, Watkin maintained the theatre building and honoured the previous owner's agreement with the college to improve the performing arts facilities. Between 1996 and 1998, Watkin attempted to run the theatre as a commercial venue in competition with the Theatre Royal, which put a financial strain on the theatre. By the late 1990s Watkin sought to recover some of his financial losses from the theatre by subdividing and selling off portions of the associated properties.

In 2004, the council brokered a partnership with Adderstone Properties, SMG Europe and the Tyne Theatre and Opera House Preservation Trust for the operation and development of the theatre and the development of new flats in the space vacated by the college. As part of the arrangements, the council secured a five-year option for the purchase of the theatre.

The history of the theatre throughout the 20th century has been one to keep the theatre in use and help it survive, through a variety of performances and flexible use of the building.

In March 2008, Newcastle City Council was able to purchase the theatre from Adderstone Properties for £600,000 and later that year transfer the freehold ownership to the Tyne Theatre and Opera House Preservation Trust.

At the time of purchase, SMG Europe, managers of the Newcastle Arena and part of a multi-national theatre and facilities management company still had over 11 years to run on their 15-year lease of the Tyne Theatre & Opera House. SMG Europe stepped away from the theatre in December 2014 after Newcastle Panto Company's Christmas production.

=== Tyne Theatre & Opera House today ===
The building is now managed by Tyne Theatre & Opera House Ltd., a new subsidiary created by Tyne Theatre & Opera House Preservation Trust.

The Tyne Theatre and Opera House Preservation Trust has plans to undertake a major refurbishing of the Tyne Theatre over the next few years with the auditorium and stage machinery being restored back to their Victorian roots as well as the creation of an education and heritage centre.

=== Famous guests and performers ===
Apart from actors and actresses, there were various types of entertainers and speakers, as the theatre was also used for a time to hold Sunday lecture circuits.

A summary list (this list is not exhaustive) of some of the main performers, entertainers and speakers over the years includes:

- Oscar Wilde, in 1885 spoke on Fashion
- Former Prime Minister William Gladstone spoke in 1891 (at 82 years of age) at the end of his political career –
- Sarah Bernhardt performed at the Tyne Theatre three times from 1895
- Host to the first performance in Newcastle of La Bohème in 1897 by the Carl Rosa Opera Company and location for the first performance on any opera stage of The Jewels of the Madonna
- Richard Todd, 1978, star of The Dambusters and Robin Hood
- Plácido Domingo performed in Tosca, May 1983
- Dame Joan Sutherland performed in 1989
- Steve Harley and Cockney Rebel performed in August 2018, in the set-list was the rarely played 2006 single, 'The Last Goodbye'.
