= Newcastle Quayside Branch =

Railway line in Newcastle upon Tyne, England

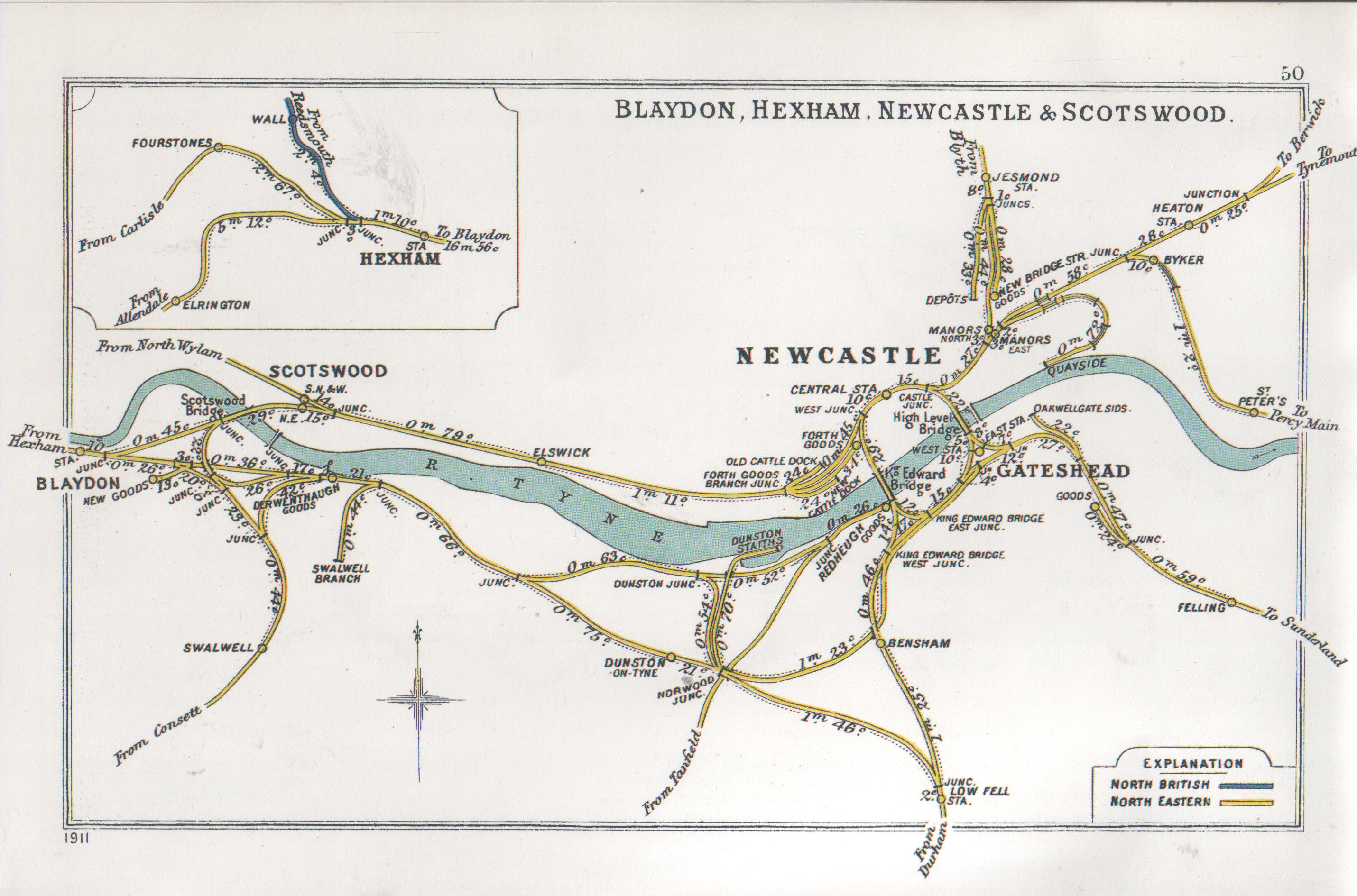
1914 map of railways of central Newcastle, the Quayside Branch can be seen right of centre

The Quayside Branch, was a 3/4-mile (1.2 km) long goods only branch line in Newcastle-upon-Tyne. It ran from Manors railway station to the Newcastle quays on the River Tyne.

== History ==
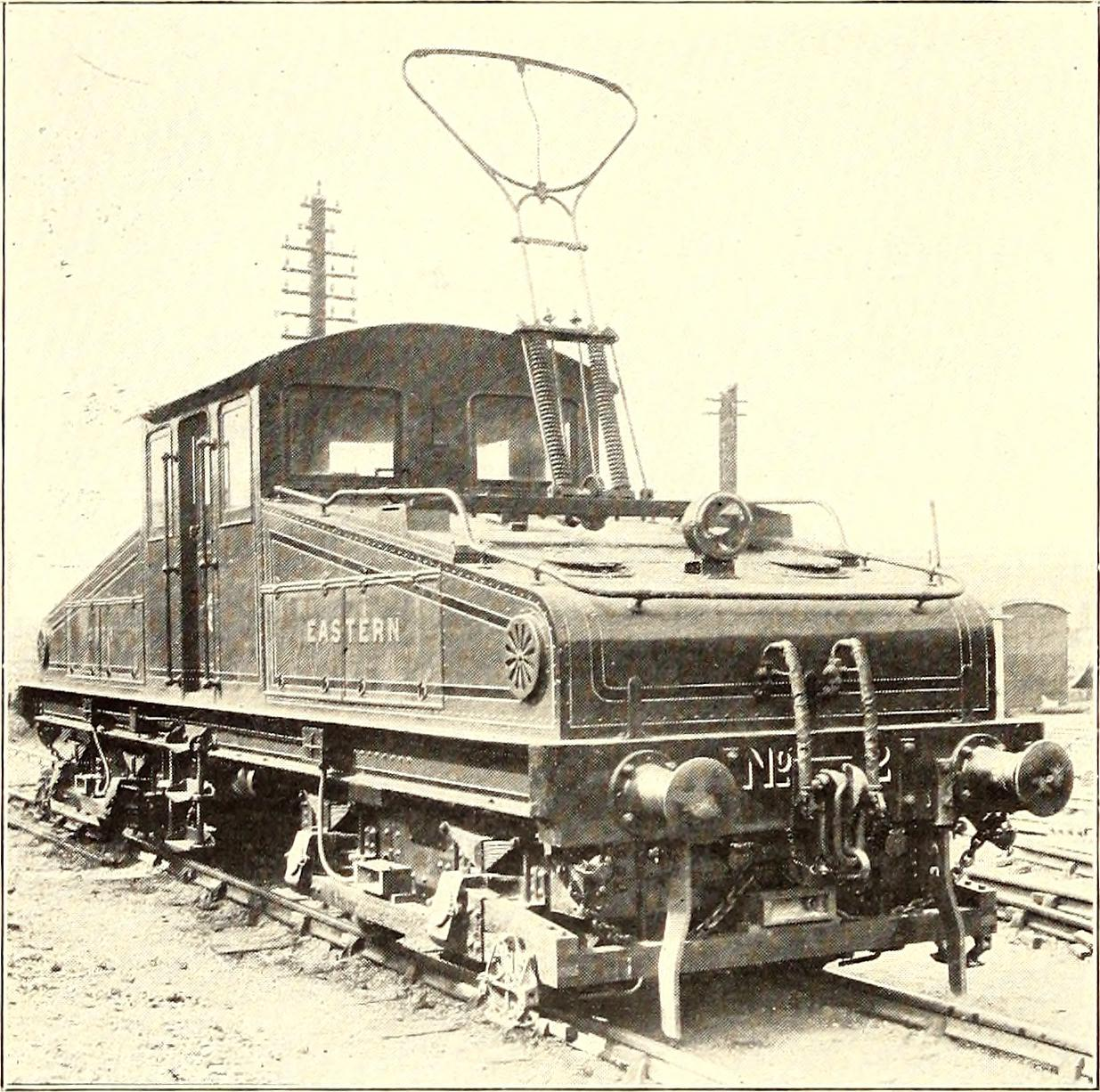
One of the NER Class ES1 electric locomotives used on the line, with its bow collector up for collecting overhead power

The single track line was authorised on 28 July 1863, and was opened by the North Eastern Railway (NER) on 1 June 1870. It was steeply graded at 1 in 27 (3.7%), and ran mostly through cuttings and tunnels. It ran east from Manors East Station, turning south-east to run, mostly in tunnels, clockwise around a semicircle to reach the eastern end of the quayside, emerging at Quayside Goods Station near St Ann's Church. Tracks from there ran west along the river as far as the Tyne Bridge area.

The line was notoriously difficult to work with steam locomotives due to its steep gradients: Smoke would often not clear from the narrow, steeply graded tunnels, and in wet weather the rails would become slippery, and in the tunnels the driver sometimes had to ask his fireman to put his shovel against the tunnel wall to make sure they were making forward progress.

On 5 June 1905 the NER inaugurated electrification of the line using a combination of third rails in the tunnels, and overhead lines in the open sections. This was carried out at the same time as their larger Tyneside Electrics electrification scheme. Two unique electric locomotives were built by British Thomson-Houston specially for the branch. They were capable of hauling up to six goods trains per hour up and down the branch in 4 1/2 minutes.

After nearly 59 years of service, the electric locomotives were retired in February 1964, and replaced by Class 03 diesel shunters, until the line itself was closed due to declining river traffic on 16 June 1969. One of the electric locomotives was preserved at the National Railway Museum in York.

In the late-1970s, the northern portal of one of the tunnels was removed during the construction of the Tyne and Wear Metro system. The tunnels and cuttings were filled in around this time.
