= Quayside =

Area in Newcastle upon Tyne and Gateshead, England

Coordinates: 54°58′08″N 1°36′17″W

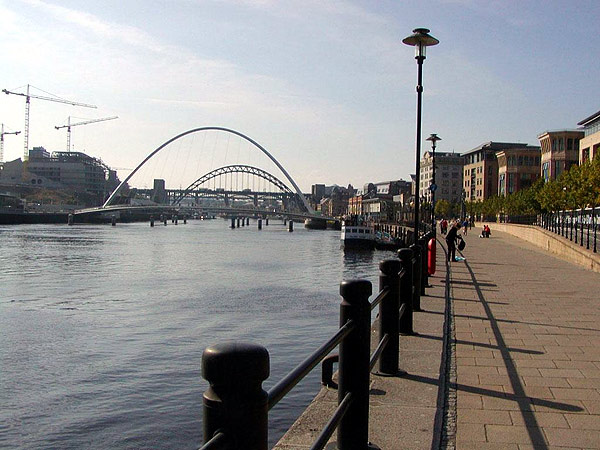
The view westwards along the Tyne Valley

The Quayside is an area along the banks (quay) of the River Tyne in Newcastle upon Tyne (the north bank) and Gateshead (south bank) in Tyne and Wear, North East England, United Kingdom.

== History ==
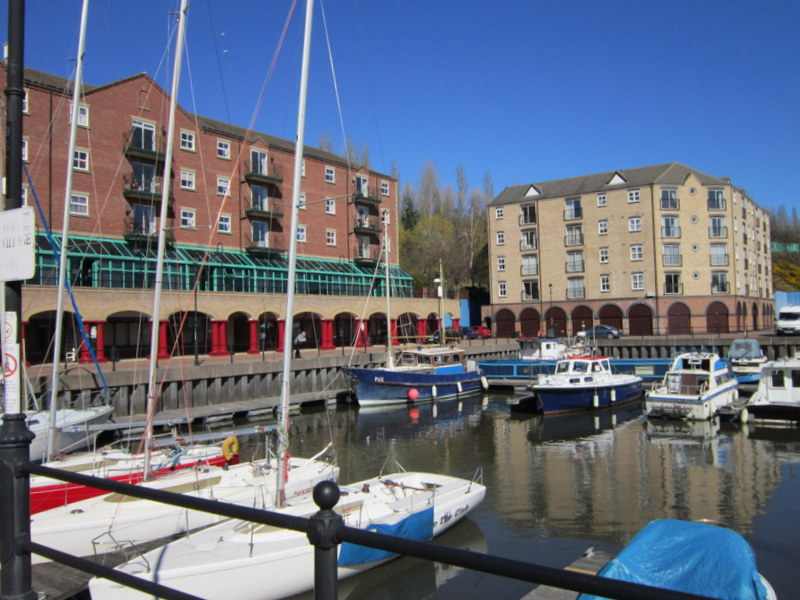
St Peter's Marina

The area was once an industrial area and busy commercial dockside serving the area, while the Newcastle side also hosted a regular street market. Trade and passenger shipping was extensive in the 19th and early 20th centuries with companies such as the Tyne Tees Steam Shipping Company and Nielsen, Andersen & Company operating services both nationally and to European countries including Belgium, Denmark and the Netherlands. The Quays were served by a railway branch line until 1969.

Following the Second World War, the docks became run-down, and, in the late 1980s, Tyne and Wear Development Corporation redeveloped the East Quayside area to a design by Terry Farrell & Partners. This provided a modern environment for the modern arts, music and culture, as well as new housing developments (e.g. at St Peter's Marina).

Along the Newcastle side is an area that houses restaurants, bars and night clubs as well as housing and the Newcastle Law Courts. The NewcastleGateshead initiative now lists the Quayside as a top ten attraction. The Gateshead side of the river is designated and signposted as Gateshead Quays. It is the site of the BALTIC Centre for Contemporary Art and The Glasshouse International Centre for Music. Also moored on the Gateshead side from 1984 until 2008 was the Tuxedo Princess (replaced for a time by sister ship Tuxedo Royale), a floating nightclub, beneath the Tyne Bridge near the Sage.

The Sage, an arena and conference centre, is under construction between the Sage Gateshead and the Baltic.

One of the Quayside's main features is the pedestrian Gateshead Millennium Bridge, opened in 2001, which spans the river between the BALTIC Centre for Contemporary Art and the Newcastle Law Courts. The other bridge which allows direct road and pedestrian links between the two banks is the low level Swing Bridge, built in 1876, and located nearer the two respective city centres. Using the two bridges, the Quayside is the venue for the junior course of the annual Great North Run.

=== Whey Aye ===
In July 2019, Newcastle City Council passed plans to erect a giant observation wheel on the quayside at Spiller's Wharf as part of a wider 'Giants on the Quayside' development. Dubbed the "Whey Aye" wheel, at 460 feet (140 m) tall it would be the tallest such structure in Europe upon completion, which was anticipated to take two years.

== Buildings ==
Notable buildings include:

- The Customs House, a Grade II listed building built in 1766, altered and refronted in 1833 by Sydney Smirke.
- The Malmaison Hotel, a Grade II listed building built in 1900 as a warehouse for the Cooperative Society.
- The Newcastle Law Courts, built between 1984 and 1990, designed by Napper Collerton, architects.
