= 8th century in England =

Events from the 8th century in England.

== Events ==
- 700
  - Osgyth, Abbess of Chich in Essex, is killed.
  - Approximate date – Beverley Minster is founded by John of Beverley.
- 704
  - Æthelred of Mercia abdicates to become a monk at Bardney and is succeeded as king by his nephew Coenred.
- 705
  - Wilfrid is re-instated as Bishop of Ripon.
  - Bede completes his first chronological work.
  - Approximate date
    - The Diocese of Sherborne is created from part of that of Winchester with Aldhelm as first bishop.
    - John of Beverley is elevated from Bishop of Hexham to Bishop of York.
- 709
  - Coenred of Mercia abdicates to become a monk in Rome and is succeeded as king by his cousin Ceolred.
- 710
  - Picts unsuccessfully invade Northumbria.
  - Approximate date – Bishop Wilfrid dies at Oundle.
- 715
  - Approximate date – Completion of Lindisfarne Gospels.
- 716
  - Æthelbald becomes King of Mercia on the death of Ceolred, marking the beginning of that kingdom's ascendancy over the other Saxon realms.
  - The 'Codex Amiatinus', the earliest surviving complete manuscript of the Vulgate, produced at Monkwearmouth–Jarrow Abbey, is taken to Italy as a gift to the Pope.
- 721
  - Death of Bishop Eadfrith of Lindisfarne.
- 722
  - King Ine of Wessex fails to conquer Cornwall, being defeated at the three battles of Hehil, Garth Maelog, and Pencon.
- 725
  - 23 April – King Wihtred of Kent dies leaving the Anglo-Saxon Kingdom of Kent to his three sons: Æthelberht II, Eadberht and Alric.
- 726
  - King Ine of Wessex abdicates to travel to Rome and is succeeded by Æthelheard.
- Before 730
  - Northumbria annexes Rheged.
- 731
  - Bede completes his Historia ecclesiastica gentis Anglorum (Ecclesiastical History of the English People).
  - 13 January – death of Berhtwald, Archbishop of Canterbury. He is succeeded by Tatwine.
- 732
  - Wilfrid II resigns the Bishopric of York and is succeeded by Ecgbert who establishes a library and school in York.
- 734
  - 30 July – death of Tatwine, Archbishop of Canterbury. He is succeeded by Nothhelm.
- 735
  - Bishopric of York elevated to an Archbishopric; Ecgbert becomes the first Archbishop.
  - 26 May – death of the Venerable Bede.
- 736
  - King Æthelbald of Mercia describes himself as "King of Britain".
- 739
  - 17 October – death of Nothhelm, Archbishop of Canterbury. He is succeeded by Cuthbert.
- 740
  - Approximate date – Æthelheard of Wessex is succeeded by Cuthred.
- 747
  - First Council of Clofeshoh reforms the Church.
- 749
  - Edict of Gumley: Church freed from its economic obligations to the King of Mercia.
- 750
  - King Eadberht of Northumbria invades the Kingdom of Strathclyde, capturing Kyle.
- 752
  - Battle of Beorhford: Cuthred of Wessex defeats Æthelbald of Mercia at Battle Edge, Burford, Oxfordshire.
- 753
  - Cuthred of Wessex fights the Cornish.
- 756
  - King Eadberht captures Dumbarton, capital of Strathclyde.
- 757
  - King Æthelbald of Mercia murdered; succeeded by Offa.
  - King Sigeberht of Wessex deposed and murdered; succeeded by Cynewulf.
  - Wat's Dyke constructed.
- 758
  - King Eadberht of Northumbria abdicates to enter a monastery at York; succeeded by his son Oswulf.
- 759
  - 24 July – King Oswulf of Northumbria is murdered at Market Weighton; succeeded by Æthelwald Moll (crowned 5 August).
- 760
  - Battle of Hereford: Battle between Mercia and the Welsh; Dyfnwal ap Tewdwr dies.
  - 26 October – death of Cuthbert, Archbishop of Canterbury. He is succeeded by Bregowine (consecrated 27 September 761).
- 761
  - 6 August – Battle of Eildon: King Æthelwald Moll of Northumbria defeats and kills a rival, Oswine, in a 3-day battle in Scotland.
- 764
  - Offa conquers Kent.
  - August – death of Bregowine, Archbishop of Canterbury. He is succeeded by Jænberht (consecrated 2 February 765 at Offa's court).
- 765
  - 30 October – King Æthelwald Moll of Northumbria deposed; succeeded by Alhred.
- 771
  - Offa conquers Sussex.
- 774
  - Offa first uses the title "King of the English".
  - King Alhred of Northumbria is deposed; succeeded by Æthelred.
- 776
  - Battle of Otford: Kent expels the Mercians.
- 778
  - Offa raids Dyfed.
- 779
  - Æthelred I of Northumbria is deposed for the first time; succeeded by Ælfwald I of Northumbria
- 779
  - Hygeberht becomes Bishop of Lichfield.
- 784
  - Offa raids Wales.
  - Construction of Offa's Dyke begins.
- 786
  - Papal legates hold councils in Mercia and Northumbria.
  - Mercia regains control of Kent.
  - The Anglo-Saxon Chronicle records that King Cynewulf of Wessex is killed in a surprise attack at his mistress's house in "Meretun" by Cyneheard the Ætheling (brother of the deposed Sigeberht), who also dies in the attack; Beorhtric takes the throne.
- 787
  - Offa issues the first silver penny.
  - At a Synod of Chelsea, Offa has his son consecrated as King; the first such ceremony in England.
- 788
  - 23 September – Ælfwald I of Northumbria is murdered, probably at Chesters, by ealdorman Sicga and succeeded by his first cousin Osred II as king of Northumbria.
  - At Offa's urging, the Pope elevates the Bishopric of Lichfield (under Hygeberht) to an Archbishopric.
- 789
  - Charlemagne establishes a trade embargo on the English after failed negotiations for his daughter to marry Offa's son.
  - Viking activity in the British Isles: First recorded raid by Vikings on England, at Portland.
- 790
  - Æthelred is restored as king of Northumbria following the deposition of Osred II and institutes minting of the styca to replace the silver sceat.
- 792
  - 12 August – death of Jænberht, Archbishop of Canterbury. He is succeeded by Æthelhard.
  - October – Osred, the deposed king of Northumbria, returns from exile and is murdered.
- 793
  - 8 June – Vikings raid Lindisfarne.
- 794
  - 6 January? – Vikings raid Jarrow.
  - 20 May – King Æthelberht II of East Anglia is beheaded on the order of King Offa of Mercia at Sutton Walls, Herefordshire.
- 796
  - 18 April – Æthelred I of Northumbria is murdered at Corbridge by a group led by ealdormen Ealdred and Wada. Osbald succeeds him as king of Northumbria for 27 days before going into exile, initially in Lindisfarne.
  - 14 May – Eardwulf succeeds as king of Northumbria.
  - 29 July – Offa of Mercia dies having raided Dyfed and possibly fought in the Battle of Rhuddlan Marsh (perhaps against Caradog ap Meirion). He is buried, maybe at Bedford, and succeeded by his son Ecgfrith who reigns only until December; Wessex regains its independence. Offa's widow Cynethryth becomes abbess of Cookham Abbey.
  - December – Ecgfrith is succeeded by Coenwulf of Mercia.
  - Kent rebels against Mercia again.
- 798
  - Kentish rebellion suppressed.
  - Saxons kill Caradog ap Meirion, King of Gwynedd.

== Births ==
- c. 700 – Lullus, Archbishop of Mainz (d. 786)

== Sources ==
- Ray, Roger (2001). "Bede". In Lapidge, Michael; et al. (eds.). Blackwell Encyclopedia of Anglo-Saxon England. Malden, MA: Blackwell. pp. 57–59. ISBN 978-0-631-22492-1.
