= List of state leaders who have been in exile =

In some cases, the deposed head of state or head of government are allowed to go into exile following a coup or other change of government, allowing a more peaceful transition to take place or to escape justice. In some cases, governments in exile are created.

There have also been instances where they managed to return to power, as did Charles II of England.

Examples in chronological order include:

Returned to power

| Name | Title | Home country | Exile period († – died in exile) | Exiled country or countries |
|---|---|---|---|---|
| Jehoahaz | King of Judah | Kingdom of Judah | 609 BC–unknown | Egypt |
| Jeconiah | King of Judah | Kingdom of Judah | 597 BC–562 BC | Babylon |
| Pisistratus | Tyrant of Athens | Athens | 561 BC–556 BC | |
| Pisistratus | Tyrant of Athens | Athens | 556 BC–546 BC | Rhaecelus |
| Arcesilaus III | King of Cyrene | Cyrene | 518 BC–515 BC | Samos |
| Lucius Tarquinius Superbus | King of Rome | Roman Kingdom | 509 BC–495 BC† | Caere, Clusium, Tusculum, and Cumae |
| Lycophron II | Tyrant of Pherae | Pherae | 352 BC–after 352 BC† | Athens |
| Arybbas | King of Epirus | Epirus | 343 BC–unknown† | Athens |
| Nectanebo II | Pharaoh of Egypt | Egypt | 342 BC–unknown† | Upper Egypt; Nubia |
| Aeacides | King of Epirus | Epirus | 316 BC–313 BC | |
| Pyrrhus | King of Epirus | Epirus | 302 BC–297 BC | |
| Cleombrotus II | King of Sparta | Sparta | 240 BC–unknown† | Tegea |
| Cleomenes III | King of Sparta | Sparta | 222 BC–219 BC† | Alexandria, Ptolemaic Egypt |
| Demetrius III Eucaerus | King of Syria | Seleucid Empire | 87 BC–after 87 BC† | Parthia |
| Herod Antipas | Tetrarch of Galilee and Perea | Galilee and Perea | 39 AD–after 39 AD† | Gaul |
| Mithridates III | King of the Bosporus | Bosporan Kingdom | 45–68† | Rome, Roman Empire |
| Julius Nepos | Roman Emperor | Western Roman Empire | 475–480† | Dalmatia |
| Romulus Augustulus | Roman Emperor | Western Roman Empire | 476–after 511† | Campania (Castellum Lucullanum) |
| Heraclonas | Byzantine Emperor | Byzantine Empire | 641–642† | Rhodes |
| Zhongzong | Emperor of the Tang dynasty | Tang dynasty | 684–698 | Fang Prefecture; Jun Prefecture |
| Justinian II | Byzantine Emperor | Byzantine Empire | 695–702/703 | Cherson |
| Eadwulf I | King of Northumbria | Northumbria | 705–717† | Dál Riata or Pictland |
| Junnin | Emperor of Japan | Japan | 764–765† | Awaji Island, Hyōgo Prefecture |
| Alhred | King of Northumbria | Northumbria | 774–unknown | Pictland |
| Telerig | Khan of Bulgaria | Bulgaria | 777–777† | Byzantine Empire |
| Æthelred I | King of Northumbria | Northumbria | 779–790 | |
| Ecgberht | King of Wessex | Wessex | 789–802 | Frankish Empire |
| Osred II | King of Northumbria | Northumbria | 790–792† | Isle of Man |
| Osbald | King of Northumbria | Northumbria | 796–799† | Lindisfarne |
| Eardwulf | King of Northumbria | Northumbria | 806–808 | Frankish Empire |
| Irene of Athens | Byzantine Empress | Byzantine Empire | 802–803† | Lesbos |
| Wiglaf | King of Mercia | Mercia | 829–830 | |
| Theodora II | Byzantine Empress | Byzantine Empire | 857–867† | Gastria, Cyprus |
| Sugandha | Queen of Kashmir | Kashmir | 906–914† | Haskapura |
| Yahya IV | Emir of Morocco | Morocco | 922–946† | Fatimid Caliphate |
| Constantine Lekapenos | Byzantine Emperor | Byzantine Empire | 945–946/948† | Samothrace |
| Hassan II | Sultan of Morocco | Morocco | 974–985† | Caliphate of Córdoba |
| Otto Orseolo | Doge of Venice | Venice | 1026–1032† | Byzantine Empire |
| Casimir I | Duke of Poland | Duchy of Poland | 1034–1039 | Kingdom of Hungary (1000–1301); Holy Roman Empire |
| Constantine IX Monomachos | Byzantine Emperor | Byzantine Empire | 1035–1042 | Lesbos |
| Bagrat IV | King of Georgia | Kingdom of Georgia | 1050–1053 | Byzantine Empire |
| Romanos IV Diogenes | Byzantine Emperor | Byzantine Empire | 1072–1072† | Proti |
| Sultan Shah ibn Radwan | Sultan of Aleppo | Aleppo | 1118–after 1125† | |
| Władysław II | High Duke of Poland; Duke of Silesia | Duchy of Poland; Duchy of Silesia | 1146–1159† | Altenburg |
| Sutoku | Emperor of Japan | Japan | 1156–1164† | Sanuki Province, Shikoku |
| Diarmait Mac Murchada | King of Leinster | Kingdom of Leinster | 1166–1167 | Kingdom of England; Kingdom of France |
| Dafydd ab Owain Gwynedd | King of Gwynedd | Kingdom of Gwynedd | 1197–1203† | Kingdom of England |
| Go-Toba | Emperor of Japan | Japan | 1221–1239† | Oki Province, Oki Islands |
| Demetrius | King of Thessalonica | Kingdom of Thessalonica | 1224–1230† | Holy Roman Empire |
| Mitso Asen | Tsar of Bulgaria | Bulgaria | 1257–before 1277/78† | Byzantine Empire |
| Ivan Asen III | Tsar of Bulgaria | Bulgaria | 1280–1303† | Golden Horde |
| George Terter I | Tsar of Bulgaria | Bulgaria | 1292–1301 | Byzantine Empire |
| Al-Nasir Muhammad | Sultan of Egypt | Mamluk Sultanate | 1294–1299 | Al-Karak |
| Al-Nasir Muhammad | Sultan of Egypt | Mamluk Sultanate | 1309–1310 | Al-Karak |
| Ivan II | Tsar of Bulgaria | Bulgaria | 1300–before 1330† | Byzantine Empire |
| Christopher II | King of Denmark | Denmark | 1326–1329 | Northern Germany |
| Ivan Stefan | Tsar of Bulgaria | Bulgaria | 1331–1373† | Serbia; Naples |
| Go-Daigo | Emperor of Japan | Japan | 1331–1333 | Oki Province, Oki Islands |
| David II | King of Scots | Scotland | 1333–1341 | France |
| Abu al-Hasan Ali ibn Othman | Sultan of Morocco | Morocco | 1348–1351† | High Atlas |
| Muhammad V | Sultan of Granada | Emirate of Granada | 1359–1362 | Morocco |
| Leo V | King of Armenia | Armenian Kingdom of Cilicia | 1375–1393† | Mamluk Sultanate; Castile; France |
| Gongyang | King of Goryeo | Goryeo | 1392–1394† | Wonju, Joseon; Samcheok, Joseon |
| Min Saw Mon | King of Arakan | Kingdom of Mrauk U | 1406–1429 | Bengal Sultanate |
| Constantine II | Tsar of Bulgaria | Tsardom of Vidin | 1422–1422† | Serbia |
| Danjong | King of Joseon | Joseon | 1457–1457† | Yeongwol |
| Muhammad XII | Sultan of Granada | Emirate of Granada | 1492–1533† | Morocco |
| Piero de' Medici | Lord of Florence | Florence | 1494–1503† | Venice; Naples |
| Eberhard II | Duke of Württemberg | Württemberg | 1498–1504† | Electoral Palatinate |
| Yeonsangun | King of Joseon | Joseon | 1506–1506† | Ganghwa Island |
| Tabariji | Sultan of Ternate | Sultanate of Ternate | 1535–1544 | Goa, Portuguese India |
| Hairun | Sultan of Ternate | Sultanate of Ternate | 1544–1546 | Goa, Portuguese India |
| Narapati IV | King of Ava | Kingdom of Ava | 1555–unknown | Pegu |
| Mary Stuart | Queen of Scotland | Scotland | 1568–1587† | England |
| Yousuf Shah Chak | Sultan of Kashmir | Kashmir Sultanate | 1579–1580 | Mughal Empire |
| Yousuf Shah Chak | Sultan of Kashmir | Kashmir Sultanate | 1586–1592† | Bihar, Mughal Empire |
| António I | King of Portugal | Kingdom of Portugal | 1580–1595† | Kingdom of France |
| Saidi Berkat | Sultan of Ternate | Sultanate of Ternate | 1606–1628† | Spanish Philippines |
| Rory O'Donnell | King of Tyrconnell | Tyrconnell | 1607–1608† | Spanish Netherlands; Papal States |
| Khalifeh Soltan | Grand Vizier of the Safavid Empire | Safavid Empire | 1632–1645 | Qom |
| Ngarolamo | Sultan of Tidore | Sultanate of Tidore | 1634–1639† | Sultanate of Ternate |
| Charles II | King of England and Ireland; King of Scotland | England; Scotland; Ireland | 1651–1660 | Kingdom of France; The Low Countries |
| Charles II | King of England and Ireland; King of Scotland | England; Scotland; Ireland | 1651–1660 | Kingdom of France; The Low Countries |
| Richard Cromwell | Lord Protector | The Protectorate | 1660–1680/81 | Kingdom of France; Continental Europe |
| Govinda Manikya | Maharaja of Tripura | Twipra Kingdom | 1661–1667 | Chittagong Hill Tracts; Kingdom of Mrauk U |
| Zheng Keshuang | Prince of Yanping | Kingdom of Tungning | 1683–1707† | Qing China |
| James II and VII | King of England and Ireland; King of Scotland | England; Scotland; Ireland | 1688–1701† | Kingdom of France |
| Chakdor Namgyal | King of Sikkim | Sikkim | 1700–1707 | Tibet |
| Charles XII | King of Sweden | Sweden | 1709–1714 | Ottoman Empire |
| Vakhtang VI | King of Kartli | Kingdom of Kartli | 1724–1737† | Russian Empire |
| Theodore I | King of Corsica | Kingdom of Corsica | 1736–1756† | Dutch Republic; Great Britain |
| Pasquale Paoli | President of Corsica | (Corsica) Corsican Republic | 1769–1790 | Great Britain; United Kingdom |
| Pasquale Paoli | President of Corsica | (Corsica) Corsican Republic | 1795–1807† | Great Britain; United Kingdom |
| Chaophraya Nakhon (Nu) | King of Nakhon Si Thammarat | Nakhon Si Thammarat Kingdom | 1770–1776 | Thonburi Kingdom |
| Şahin Giray | Khan of Crimea | Crimean Khanate | 1783–1787† | Russian Empire; Ottoman Empire |
| Tenzing Namgyal | King of Sikkim | Kingdom of Sikkim | 1788–1793† | Tibet |
| Louis XVIII | King of France | France | 1791–1814 | Prussia; Great Britain; Russia |
| William V | Stadtholder | Dutch Republic | 1795–1806† | Great Britain; Prussia |
| William I and VI | King of the Netherlands; Grand Duke of Luxembourg; Prince of Orange-Nassau | Netherlands; Luxembourg | 1795–1813 | Great Britain; Prussia |
| Shah Shujah Durrani | Emir of Afghanistan | Durrani Empire | 1809–1839 | Punjab |
| Louis I | King of Holland | (Netherlands) Kingdom of Holland | 1810–1846† | France; Austrian Empire; Swiss Confederacy; Papal States; Tuscany |
| Cornelio Saavedra | President of the Primera Junta | United Provinces of the Río de la Plata | 1811–1815 | Chile |
| Hamengkubuwono II | Sultan of Yogyakarta | Yogyakarta Sultanate | 1812–1815 | Penang |
| Hamengkubuwono II | Sultan of Yogyakarta | Yogyakarta Sultanate | 1817–1826 | Ambon, Dutch East Indies |
| Tenskwatawa | Leader of Tecumseh's Confederacy | Tecumseh's Confederacy | 1813–1824 | Canada |
| Napoleon | Emperor of the French | First French Empire | 1814–1815 | Elba |
| Napoleon | Emperor of the French | First French Empire | 1815–1821† | (United Kingdom) Saint Helena |
| Sri Vikrama Rajasinha | King of Kandy | Kingdom of Kandy | 1815–1832† | Vellore Fort, British India |
| Baji Rao II | Peshwa | Maratha Confederacy | 1818–1851† | Bithur, British India |
| Ahmad Tajuddin II | Sultan of Kedah | Kedah Sultanate | 1821–1842 | Penang Penang; Malacca |
| Bernabé Aráoz | President of the Republic of Tucumán | Republic of Tucumán | 1823–1824 | Salta, Río de la Plata |
| Agustín I | Emperor of Mexico | Mexico | 1823–1824 | Tuscany; United Kingdom |
| Charles X | King of France | France | 1830–1836† | United Kingdom; Austrian Empire |
| Louis XIX | King of France | France | 1830–1844† | United Kingdom; Austrian Empire |
| Henry V | King of France | France | 1830–1883† | United Kingdom; Austrian Empire |
| Charles II | Duke of Brunswick | Brunswick | 1830–1873† | United Kingdom; France; Switzerland |
| Pakubuwono VI | Susuhunan of Surakarta | Surakarta Sunanate | 1830–1849† | Ambon, Dutch East Indies |
| Tanoa Visawaqa | Vunivalu of Bau | Kubuna Confederacy | 1832–1837 | Koro Island; Somosomo, Taveuni |
| Miguel I | King of Portugal | Portugal | 1834–1847 | Papal States |
| Miguel I | King of Portugal | Portugal | 1847–1851 | United Kingdom |
| Miguel I | King of Portugal | Portugal | 1851–1866† | Baden |
| Antonio López de Santa Anna | President of Mexico | Mexico | 1836–1837 | United States |
| Antonio López de Santa Anna | President of Mexico | Mexico | 1845–1846 | Cuba |
| Antonio López de Santa Anna | President of Mexico | Mexico | 1848–1853 | Colony of Jamaica; Republic of New Granada |
| Antonio López de Santa Anna | President of Mexico | Mexico | 1855–1864 | Cuba; Colombia; St. Thomas; United States |
| Antonio López de Santa Anna | President of Mexico | Mexico | 1864–1867 | Cuba; St. Thomas; United States |
| Antonio López de Santa Anna | President of Mexico | Mexico | 1867–1874 | Cuba; Dominican Republic; Bahamas |
| Pratap Singh | Chhatrapati | Maratha Confederacy | 1839–1847† | Benares State, British India |
| Joaquin Mora Fernandez | Head of State of Costa Rica | Costa Rica | 1839–1842 | Chile |
| Dost Mohammad Khan | Emir of Afghanistan | Emirate of Afghanistan | 1840–1842 | Mussoorie |
| Tomás Bobadilla | President of the Dominican Republic | Dominican Republic | 1844–1849 | |
| Tomás Bobadilla | President of the Dominican Republic | Dominican Republic | 1868–1871† | Puerto Rico; Haiti |
| Louis Philippe I | King of the French | France | 1848–1850† | United Kingdom |
| Juan Manuel de Rosas | Governor of Buenos Aires | Argentina | 1852–1877† | United Kingdom |
| Duleep Singh | Maharaja | Sikh Empire | 1854–1893† | United Kingdom |
| William Dappa Pepple I | King of Bonny | Kingdom of Bonny | 1854–1861 | United Kingdom |
| Wajid Ali Shah | Nawab of Awadh | Oudh State | 1856–1887† | Metiabruz, Bengal Presidency |
| Bahadur Shah II | Mughal Emperor | Mughal Empire | 1857–1862† | British India |
| Birjis Qadr | Nawab of Awadh | Oudh State | 1858–1887 | Kingdom of Nepal |
| Ali Bahadur II | Nawab of Banda | Banda State | 1858–1873† | Indore State |
| Faustin I | Emperor of Haiti | Second Empire of Haiti | 1858–1867 | Colony of Jamaica |
| Francisco Dueñas | President of El Salvador | El Salvador | 1859–1861 | Guatemala |
| Francisco Dueñas | President of El Salvador | El Salvador | 1861–1863 | Guatemala |
| Francisco Dueñas | President of El Salvador | El Salvador | 1872–1878 | United States |
| Francisco Dueñas | President of El Salvador | El Salvador | 1878–1883 | United States |
| Francisco Dueñas | President of El Salvador | El Salvador | 1883–1884† | United States |
| Rafael Campo | President of El Salvador | El Salvador | 1862–1863 | Guatemala |
| Rafael Campo | President of El Salvador | El Salvador | 1870–1871 | Nicaragua |
| Rafael Campo | President of El Salvador | El Salvador | 1872–1879 | Nicaragua |
| Rafael Campo | President of El Salvador | El Salvador | 1880–1882 | Nicaragua |
| Bartolomé Calvo | President of the Granadine Confederation | Granadine Confederation | 1861–1876 | Puerto Rico; Ecuador |
| José Antonio Páez | President of Venezuela | Venezuela | 1863–1873† | United States |
| Eugenio Aguilar | President of El Salvador | El Salvador | 1863 | Guatemala |
| Gerardo Barrios | President of El Salvador | El Salvador | 1863–1865 | Colombia; United States |
| George V | King of Hanover | Kingdom of Hanover | 1866–1878† | Austrian Empire; France |
| Isabella II | Queen of Spain | Spain | 1868–1876 | France |
| Isabella II | Queen of Spain | Spain | 1877–1904† | France |
| Napoleon III | Emperor of the French | France | 1871–1873† | United Kingdom |
| Muhammad Khudayar Khan | Khan of Kokand | Khanate of Kokand | 1875–1886† | Russian Empire; Emirate of Afghanistan |
| Abdullah II | Sultan of Perak | Perak | 1876–1894 | British Mauritius (Seychelles) |
| Michel Domingue | President of Haiti | Haiti | 1876–1877† | Colony of Jamaica |
| Ismail Pasha | Khedive of Egypt | Khedivate of Egypt | 1879–1895† | Italy; Ottoman Empire |
| Cetshwayo | King of the Zulu Nation | Zulu Kingdom | 1879–1883 | Cape Colony; United Kingdom |
| Thibaw Min | King of Burma | (Konbaung dynasty) Burma | 1885–1916† | British India |
| Fernando Figueroa | President of El Salvador | El Salvador | 1885–1891 | Unknown |
| Jaja | King of Opobo | Opobo | 1887–1891† | Gold Coast; United Kingdom; British Windward Islands |
| Hàm Nghi | Emperor of Vietnam | Nguyễn dynasty | 1888–1943† | French Algeria |
| Pedro II | Emperor of Brazil | Empire of Brazil | 1889–1891† | France |
| Kalema | Kabaka of Buganda | Buganda | 1889–1891† | Bunyoro |
| Dinuzulu | King of the Zulu Nation | Zulu Kingdom | 1890–1897 | Saint Helena |
| Yusuf Ali Kenadid | Sultan of Hobyo | Sultanate of Hobyo | 1890–1911† | Aden Protectorate; Italian Eritrea |
| Dinah Salifou | King of the Nalu | Nalu people | 1890–1897† | French Senegal |
| Béhanzin | King of Dahomey | Kingdom of Dahomey | 1894–1906† | Martinique; French Algeria |
| Robert Henry Clarence | Chief of the Miskito | Miskito Kingdom | 1894–1908† | Costa Rica; Jamaica |
| Carlos Ezeta | President of El Salvador | El Salvador | 1894–1903† | Colombia; Mexico |
| Gungunhana | King of Gaza | Gaza Empire | 1895–1906† | Portugal; Portugal |
| Khalid bin Barghash | Sultan of Zanzibar | Zanzibar | 1896–1927† | German East Africa; British Mauritius (Seychelles); Saint Helena; British East Africa |
| Prempeh I | King of Ashanti | Ashanti Kingdom | 1896–1924 | British Sierra Leone (1896–1900); British Seychelles (1900–1924) |
| Wobgho | Mogho Naba of Ouagadougou | Ouagadougou | 1897–1904† | Gold Coast |
| Ranavalona III | Queen of Madagascar | Madagascar | 1897–1907† | Réunion; French Algeria |
| Ovonramwen | King of Benin | Kingdom of Benin | 1897–1914† | British Southern Nigeria |
| Manuel Barillas | President of Guatemala | Guatemala | 1898–1907† | Mexico |
| Samori Toure | Wassoulou Emperor | Wassoulou Empire | 1898–1900† | French Senegal; French Gabon |
| Mwanga II | Kabaka of Buganda | Buganda | 1899–1903† | British Seychelles |
| Chwa II Kabalega | Omukama of Bunyoro | Bunyoro | 1899–1924 | British Seychelles |
| Paul Kruger | President of the South African Republic | Transvaal | 1900–1904† | Netherlands; France; Switzerland |
| Agoli-agbo | King of Dahomey | Kingdom of Dahomey | 1900–1910 | French Gabon |
| Francis William Reitz | President of the Orange Free State | Orange Free State | 1902–1907 | Netherlands |
| Tirésias Simon Sam | President of Haiti | Haiti | 1902–1908 | Danish West Indies (Saint Thomas) |
| Mussa Moloh | King of Fuladu | Fuladu | 1903–1931† | British Gambia; British Sierra Leone |
| Thành Thái | Emperor of Vietnam | French Annam | 1907–1954 | French Cochinchina; Réunion |
| Pierre Nord Alexis | President of Haiti | Haiti | 1908–1910† | Colony of Jamaica; United States |
| Cipriano Castro | President of Venezuela | Venezuela | 1909–1924† | United States |
| Mohammad Ali Shah Qajar | Shah of Iran | Iran | 1909–1925† | Russian Empire (1909–1920); Ottoman Empire (1920–1921); Kingdom of Italy (1921–1925) |
| José Santos Zelaya | President of Nicaragua | Nicaragua | 1909–1919† | Spain; United States |
| Manuel II | King of Portugal | Kingdom of Portugal | 1910–1932† | Gibraltar; United Kingdom |
| Porfirio Díaz | President of Mexico | Mexico | 1911–1915† | Spain; France |
| Sun Yat-Sen | President of the Republic of China | Hawaii (now a state of the USA) | 1913–1916 | Japan |
| Victoriano Huerta | President of Mexico | Mexico | 1914–1916† | United Kingdom; Spain; United States |
| Guillermo Billinghurst | President of Peru | Peru | 1914–1915† | Chile |
| Abbas II | Khedive of Egypt | Khedivate of Egypt | 1914–1944† | Ottoman Empire; Italy; Switzerland |
| Muhammad Usman | Sultan of Ternate | Sultanate of Ternate | 1915–1932 | Dutch East Indies (Java) |
| Duy Tân | Emperor of Vietnam | French Annam | 1916–1945† | Réunion; France; French Equatorial Africa |
| Alexander Kerensky | Prime Minister of Russia | Russian Republic | 1917–1970† | French Third Republic; United States |
| Constantine I | King of the Hellenes | Kingdom of Greece | 1917–1920 | Switzerland |
| Constantine I | King of the Hellenes | Kingdom of Greece | 1922–1923† | Italy |
| Ferdinand I | Tsar of Bulgaria | Kingdom of Bulgaria | 1918–1948† | Germany |
| Wilhelm II | Emperor of Germany | German Empire | 1918–1941† | Netherlands |
| Nikola I | King of Montenegro | Kingdom of Montenegro | 1918–1921† | France |
| Ludwig III | King of Bavaria | Bavaria | 1918–1918 | Archduchy of Austria |
| Ludwig III | King of Bavaria | Bavaria | 1919–1920 | First Hungarian Republic; Liechtenstein; Switzerland |
| Marie-Adélaïde | Grand Duchess of Luxembourg | Luxembourg | 1919–1924† | Italy; Germany |
| Charles I and IV | Emperor of Austria; King of Hungary | Austria-Hungary | 1919–1921 | Switzerland |
| Charles I and IV | Emperor of Austria; King of Hungary | Austria-Hungary | 1921–1922† | Portugal |
| Francisco Bertrand | President of Honduras | Honduras | 1919–1926 | United States |
| Pavlo Skoropadskyi | Hetman of all Ukraine | Ukrainian State | 1919–1945 | Germany |
| Symon Petliura | Chairman of the Directorate of Ukraine | Ukrainian People's Republic | 1920–1926† | Poland; Kingdom of Hungary; Switzerland; France |
| Sayid Abdullah | Khan of Khiva | Khanate of Khiva | 1920–1933† | Ukrainian SSR |
| Mohamoud Ali Shire | Sultan of Warsengali | Warsangali Sultanate | 1920–1928 | British Seychelles |
| Faisal I | King of Syria | Arab Kingdom of Syria | 1920–1933† | United Kingdom |
| Jameel Al-Madfaai | Prime Minister of Iraq | Kingdom of Iraq | 1920–1923 | Emirate of Transjordan |
| Jameel Al-Madfaai | Prime Minister of Iraq | Kingdom of Iraq | 1941 | Emirate of Transjordan |
| Mahmud Barzanji | King of Kurdistan | Kurdistan | 1921–1922 | British India |
| Mahmud Barzanji | King of Kurdistan | Kurdistan | 1932–1941 | Iraq (Nasiriyah) |
| Carlos Herrera | President of Guatemala | Guatemala | 1921–1930† | France |
| Akaki Chkhenkeli | Prime Minister of the Transcaucasian Democratic Federative Republic | Transcaucasian Democratic Federative Republic | 1921–1959† | France |
| Noe Zhordania | Prime Minister of Georgia | Georgia | 1921–1953† | France |
| Nestor Makhno | Otaman of the Makhnovshchina | Makhnovshchina | 1921–1934† | Romania; Poland; Danzig; France |
| Mehmed VI | Sultan of the Ottoman Empire | Ottoman Empire | 1922–1926† | Crown Colony of Malta; Kingdom of Italy |
| Mahammad Amin Rasulzade | President of the Azerbaijani National Council | Azerbaijan | 1922–1955† | Turkey |
| Idris | Chief of the Senussi Order; Emir of Cyrenaica; Emir of Tripolitania | Italian Cyrenaica | 1922–1947 | Kingdom of Egypt |
| Idris | King of Libya | Kingdom of Libya | 1969–1983† | Egypt |
| Ahmad Shah Qajar | Shah of Iran | Iran | 1923–1930† | French Third Republic |
| Arturo Alessandri | President of Chile | Chile | 1924–1925 | Kingdom of Italy |
| George II | King of the Hellenes | Kingdom of Greece | 1924–1935 | Kingdom of Romania |
| George II | King of the Hellenes | Kingdom of Greece | 1941–1945 | Kingdom of Egypt; United Kingdom |
| Hussein bin Ali | King of Hejaz | Hejaz | 1925–1930 | British Cyprus |
| Ali bin Hussein | King of Hejaz | Hejaz | 1925–1935† | Kingdom of Iraq |
| Abd el-Krim | President of the Republic of the Rif | Republic of the Rif | 1926–1963† | Réunion (1926–1947); Kingdom of Egypt |
| Alfonso Quiñónez Molina | President of El Salvador | El Salvador | 1927–1936 | France |
| Jorge Meléndez | President of El Salvador | El Salvador | 1927–unknown | Costa Rica |
| Amanullah Khan | King of Afghanistan | Afghanistan | 1929–1960† | British India; Kingdom of Italy |
| Washington Luís | President of Brazil | First Brazilian Republic | 1930–1947 | Switzerland; Portugal; United States |
| Carlos Ibáñez del Campo | President of Chile | Chile | 1931–1937 | Argentina |
| Alfonso XIII | King of Spain | Spain | 1931–1941† | Italy |
| Arturo Araujo | President of El Salvador | El Salvador | 1931–unknown | Guatemala |
| Pío Romero Bosque | President of El Salvador | El Salvador | 1933–1934† | Nicaragua |
| Tukojirao III | Maharaja of Dewas | Dewas State | 1934–1937† | French India |
| Prajadhipok | King of Siam | Siam | 1935–1941† | United Kingdom |
| Niceto Alcalá-Zamora | Prime Minister of Spain | Second Spanish Republic | 1936–1949† | France (1936–1942); Argentina (1942–1949) |
| Haile Selassie I | Emperor of Ethiopia | Ethiopian Empire | 1936–1941 | United Kingdom |
| Juan Bautista Sacasa | President of Nicaragua | Nicaragua | 1936–1946† | United States |
| Yasin al-Hashimi | Prime Minister of Iraq | Kingdom of Iraq | 1936–1937† | Lebanon |
| Nuri al-Said | Prime Minister of Iraq | Kingdom of Iraq | 1936–1937 | Egypt |
| Nuri al-Said | Prime Minister of Iraq | Kingdom of Iraq | 1941 | Transjordan |
| Edvard Beneš | President of Czechoslovakia | Czechoslovakia | 1938–1945 | United Kingdom |
| Augustinas Voldemaras | Prime Minister of Lithuania | Lithuania | 1938–1939 | France |
| Augustinas Voldemaras | Prime Minister of Lithuania | Lithuania | 1940–1942 | Soviet Union |
| Edward VIII | King of the United Kingdom | United Kingdom | 1937–1972† | France; Spain; Portugal; Bahamas; France |
| Manuel Azaña | Prime Minister of Spain; President of Spain | Second Spanish Republic | 1939–1940† | French Third Republic |
| Zog I | King of Albania | Kingdom of Albania | 1939–1961† | Greece; United Kingdom; France |
| Władysław Sikorski | Prime Minister of Poland | Second Polish Republic | 1939–1943† | United Kingdom; Gibraltar |
| Haakon VII | King of Norway | Norway | 1940–1945 | United Kingdom |
| Johan Nygaardsvold | Prime Minister of Norway | Norway | 1940–1945 | United Kingdom |
| Charlotte | Grand Duchess of Luxembourg | Luxembourg | 1940–1945 | France; Portugal; United Kingdom; United States; Canada |
| Wilhelmina | Queen of the Netherlands | Netherlands | 1940–1945 | United Kingdom |
| Dirk Jan de Geer | Prime Minister of the Netherlands | Netherlands | 1940–1941 | United Kingdom |
| Pieter Sjoerds Gerbrandy | Prime Minister of the Netherlands | Netherlands | 1940–1945 | United Kingdom |
| Hubert Pierlot | Prime Minister of Belgium | Belgium | 1940–1945 | United Kingdom |
| Antanas Smetona | President of Lithuania | Lithuania | 1940–1944† | United States |
| Eduardo Schaerer | President of Paraguay | Paraguay | 1940–1941† | Argentina |
| Emmanouil Tsouderos | Prime Minister of Greece | Kingdom of Greece | 1941–1944 | Kingdom of Egypt; United Kingdom |
| Abd al-Ilah | Regent of Iraq | Kingdom of Iraq | 1941–1941 | Emirate of Transjordan |
| Rezā Shāh | Shah of Iran | Iran | 1941–1944† | British Mauritius; Union of South Africa |
| Sofoklis Venizelos | Prime Minister of Greece | Kingdom of Greece | 1944 | Kingdom of Egypt |
| Georgios Papandreou | Prime Minister of Greece | Kingdom of Greece | 1944–1945 | Kingdom of Egypt |
| Arnulfo Arias Madrid | President of Panama | Panama | 1941–1945, 1951–1960 | Latin America |
| Arnulfo Arias Madrid | President of Panama | Panama | 1968–1978, 1984–1988† | United States |
| Moncef Bey | Bey of Tunis | Tunisia | 1943–1948† | French Algeria; France |
| Maximiliano Hernández Martínez | President of El Salvador | El Salvador | 1944–1955 | Honduras |
| Maximiliano Hernández Martínez | President of El Salvador | El Salvador | 1955–1966† | Honduras |
| Jorge Ubico | President of Guatemala | Guatemala | 1944–1946† | United States |
| Isaías Medina Angarita | President of Venezuela | Venezuela | 1945–1953† | United States |
| Miklós Horthy | Regent of Hungary | Hungary | 1945–1957† | France (1945–1949); Portugal (1949–1957) |
| Peter II | King of Yugoslavia | Yugoslavia | 1945–1970† | United States |
| Victor Emmanuel III | King of Italy | Kingdom of Italy | 1946–1947† | Kingdom of Egypt |
| Umberto II | King of Italy | Kingdom of Italy | 1946–1983† | Portugal; Switzerland |
| Simeon II | Tsar of Bulgaria | Kingdom of Bulgaria | 1946–1996 | Kingdom of Egypt; Spain |
| Leonardo Argüello Barreto | President of Nicaragua | Nicaragua | 1947–1947† | Mexico |
| Thawi Bunyaket | Prime Minister of Thailand | Thailand | 1947–1957 | Malaya |
| Pridi Banomyong | Prime Minister of Thailand | Thailand | 1947–1947; 1948–1971 | Colony of Singapore; China; France |
| Thawan Thamrongnawasawat | Prime Minister of Thailand | Thailand | 1947–1948 | British Hong Kong |
| Teodoro Picado Michalski | President of Costa Rica | Costa Rica | 1948–1960† | Nicaragua |
| José Bustamante y Rivero | President of Peru | Peru | 1948–1955 | Argentina |
| Rómulo Betancourt | President of Venezuela | Venezuela | 1948–1958 | United States; Cuba; Costa Rica |
| Rómulo Gallegos | President of Venezuela | Venezuela | 1948–1958 | Cuba; Mexico |
| Michael I | King of Romania | Kingdom of Romania | 1948–1997 | United Kingdom; Switzerland |
| Sultan bin Salim Al Qasimi | Ruler of Ras Al Khaimah | Ras Al Khaimah | 1948–1951† | Sharjah |
| Muhammad Mahabat Khan III | Nawab of Junagadh | Junagadh State | 1948–1959† | Pakistan |
| Shukri al-Quwatli | President of Syria | First Syrian Republic | 1949–1955 | Egypt |
| Chiang Kai-shek | President of China | China | 1949–1975† | Taiwan (Note: Remained nominally under Japanese sovereignty until 28 April 1952. The islands of Taiwan and Penghu are currently administered by the Republic of China, which is currently recognized by 11 UN member states and Holy See, and are claimed by the People's Republic of China.) |
| Tribhuvan | King of Nepal | Kingdom of Nepal | 1950–1951 | India |
| Carlos Prío Socarrás | President of Cuba | Cuba | 1952–1975† | United States |
| Farouk | King of Egypt | Kingdom of Egypt | 1952–1965† | Monaco; Italy |
| Fuad II | King of Egypt | Kingdom of Egypt | 1952–present | Switzerland; France |
| Laureano Gómez | President of Colombia | Colombia | 1953–1959 | Spain |
| Mohammed V | Sultan of Morocco | Morocco | 1953–1955 | France (1953–1954); French Madagascar (1954–1955) |
| Fawzi Selu | President of Syria; Prime Minister of Syria | Syria | 1954–early 1960s | Saudi Arabia |
| Husni al-Barazi | Prime Minister of Syria | Syria | 1954–1975† | Lebanon; Turkey |
| Adib Shishakli | President of Syria; Prime Minister of Syria | Syria | 1954–1964† | Lebanon; Brazil |
| Jacobo Árbenz | President of Guatemala | Guatemala | 1954–1971† | France; Czechoslovakia; Soviet Union; Uruguay (1957–1960); Cuba (1960–1965); Mexico (1965–1971) |
| Juan Perón | President of Argentina | Argentina | 1955–1973 | Venezuela (1955–1958); Spain (1958–1973) |
| Mohammed Ben Aarafa | Sultan of Morocco | Morocco | 1955–1976† | Tangier; France; Lebanon; France |
| Bảo Đại | Emperor of Vietnam | South Vietnam | 1955–1997† | France; Monaco |
| Paul Magloire | President of Haiti | Haiti | 1956–1986 | United States |
| Imre Nagy | Prime Minister of Hungary | Hungarian People's Republic | 1956–1957 | Socialist Federal Republic of Yugoslavia (embassy); Socialist Republic of Romania |
| Plaek Phibunsongkhram | Prime Minister of Thailand | Thailand | 1957–1964† | Cambodia; Japan |
| Gustavo Rojas Pinilla | President of Colombia | Colombia | 1957–1958 | Spain or Dominican Republic |
| Iskander Mirza | President of Pakistan | Pakistan | 1958–1969† | United Kingdom |
| Marcos Pérez Jiménez | President of Venezuela | Venezuela | 1958–1963 | United States |
| Marcos Pérez Jiménez | President of Venezuela | Venezuela | 1968–2001† | Spain |
| Tenzin Gyatso | 14th Dalai Lama | Tibet (1912–1951) | 1959–present | India |
| Ghalib al-Hinai | Imam of Oman | Imamate of Oman | 1959–2009† | Saudi Arabia |
| Fulgencio Batista | President of Cuba | Cuba | 1959–1973† | Dominican Republic; Portugal; Spain |
| Anselmo Alliegro y Milá | President of Cuba | Cuba | 1959–1961† | United States |
| Andrés Domingo y Morales del Castillo | President of Cuba | Cuba | 1959–1979† | United States |
| Syngman Rhee | President of South Korea | South Korea | 1960–1965† | United States |
| José María Lemus | President of El Salvador | El Salvador | 1960–1993† | United States; Costa Rica |
| Kigeli V | King of Rwanda | Kingdom of Rwanda | 1961–2016† | Tanganyika; Uganda; Kenya; United States |
| Joaquín Balaguer | President of the Dominican Republic | Dominican Republic | 1962–1966 | United States |
| Manuel Prado Ugarteche | President of Peru | Peru | 1962–1967† | France |
| Albert Kalonji | Mulopwe | South Kasai | 1962–1964 | Spain |
| Albert Kalonji | Mulopwe | South Kasai | 1965–? | Europe |
| Albert Kalonji | Mulopwe | South Kasai | 1997–2005 | France |
| Moïse Tshombe | President of Katanga | Katanga | 1963–1964 | Northern Rhodesia; Spain |
| Moïse Tshombe | Prime Minister of the Democratic Republic of the Congo | DR Congo | 1965–1969† | Spain; Algeria |
| Juan Bosch | President of the Dominican Republic | Dominican Republic | 1963–1966 | Puerto Rico |
| Abdullah Afeef | President of the United Suvadive Republic | United Suvadive Republic | 1963–1993† | Seychelles |
| Nazim al-Qudsi | President of Syria | Syria | 1963–1998† | Lebanon; Europe; Jordan |
| Khalid al-Azm | Prime Minister of Syria | Syria | 1963–1965† | Lebanon |
| Maamun al-Kuzbari | Prime Minister of Syria | Syria | 1963–1998† | France; Morocco; Lebanon |
| Maarouf al-Dawalibi | Prime Minister of Syria | Syria | 1963–2004† | Lebanon; Saudi Arabia |
| Jamshid bin Abdullah | Sultan of Zanzibar | Sultanate of Zanzibar | 1964–2020 | United Kingdom; Oman |
| Juscelino Kubitschek | President of Brazil | Fourth Brazilian Republic | 1964–1967 | United States |
| Víctor Paz Estenssoro | President of Bolivia | Bolivia | 1964–1978 | Peru |
| Víctor Paz Estenssoro | President of Bolivia | Bolivia | 1980–1982 | Peru |
| Saud | King of Saudi Arabia | Saudi Arabia | 1964–1969† | Switzerland; Egypt; Kingdom of Greece |
| João Goulart | President of Brazil | Brazil | 1964–1976† | Uruguay (1964–1973); Argentina (1973–1976) |
| Mohamed Boudiaf | Chairman of the High Council of State | Algeria | 1964–1992 | Morocco (Kenitra) |
| Fulbert Youlou | President of the Republic of Congo | Republic of Congo | 1965–1972† | Democratic Republic of the Congo; Spain |
| Nguyễn Khánh | Prime Minister of South Vietnam | South Vietnam | 1965–2013† | France; United States |
| Saqr bin Sultan Al Qasimi | Ruler of Sharjah | Sharjah | 1965–1972 | Bahrain; Egypt |
| Mutesa II | President of Uganda; Kabaka of Buganda | Uganda | 1966–1969† | United Kingdom |
| Kwame Nkrumah | President of Ghana | Ghana | 1966–1972† | Guinea (1966–1971); Socialist Republic of Romania (1971–1972) |
| Mwambutsa IV | King of Burundi | Kingdom of Burundi | 1966–1977† | Democratic Republic of the Congo; Switzerland |
| Ntare V | King of Burundi | Kingdom of Burundi | 1966–1972 | West Germany; Uganda |
| Shakhbut bin Sultan Al Nahyan | Ruler of Abu Dhabi | Abu Dhabi | 1966–1970 | Iran |
| Amin al-Hafiz | President of Syria | Syria | 1966–2003 | Lebanon; Iraq |
| Salah al-Din al-Bitar | Prime Minister of Syria | Syria | 1966–1980† | Lebanon; France |
| Constantine II | King of the Hellenes | Kingdom of Greece | 1967–2013 | Italy; United Kingdom |
| Fernando Belaúnde Terry | President of Peru | Peru | 1968–1980 | United States |
| Abd ar-Razzaq an-Naif | Prime Minister of Iraq | Iraqi Republic (1958–1968) | 1968–1978† | Switzerland; United Kingdom; Jordan |
| Muhammad al-Badr | King of Yemen | Mutawakkilite Kingdom of Yemen | 1969–1996† | Saudi Arabia; United Kingdom |
| Norodom Sihanouk | Prime Minister of Cambodia | Cambodia | 1970–1993 | China; North Korea |
| Said bin Taimur | Sultan of Oman | Oman | 1970–1972† | United Kingdom |
| Moshoeshoe II | King of Lesotho | Lesotho | 1970–1970 | Netherlands |
| Moshoeshoe II | King of Lesotho | Lesotho | 1990–1992 | United Kingdom |
| Milton Obote | President of Uganda | Uganda | 1971–1979 | Tanzania |
| Milton Obote | President of Uganda | Uganda | 1985–2005† | Zambia |
| Ahmad bin Ali Al Thani | Emir of Qatar | Qatar | 1972–1977† | Dubai, United Arab Emirates |
| Son Ngoc Thanh | Prime Minister of the Khmer Republic | Khmer Republic | 1972–1977† | South Vietnam |
| Mohammed Zahir Shah | King of Afghanistan | Kingdom of Afghanistan | 1973–2002 | Italy |
| Thanom Kittikachorn | Prime Minister of Thailand | Thailand | 1973–1976 | United States; Singapore |
| Américo Tomás | President of Portugal | Portugal | 1974–1980 | Brazil |
| Marcello Caetano | Prime Minister of Portugal | Portugal | 1974–1980† | Brazil |
| António de Spínola | President of Portugal | Portugal | 1974–1976† | Brazil |
| Makarios III | President of Cyprus | Cyprus | 1974 | United Kingdom |
| Cheng Heng | President of the Khmer Republic | Khmer Republic | 1975–1992 | France; United States |
| Lon Nol | President of the Khmer Republic | Khmer Republic | 1975–1985† | Indonesia; United States |
| In Tam | Prime Minister of the Khmer Republic | Khmer Republic | 1975–2006† | United States |
| Nguyễn Văn Thiệu | President of South Vietnam | South Vietnam | 1975–2001† | Taiwan; United Kingdom; United States |
| Trần Thiện Khiêm | Prime Minister of South Vietnam | South Vietnam | 1975–2021† | United States |
| Nguyễn Bá Cẩn | Prime Minister of South Vietnam | South Vietnam | 1975–2009† | United States |
| Boun Oum | Prime Minister of Laos | Laos | 1975–1980† | France |
| Alimirah Hanfare | Sultan of Aussa | Sultanate of Aussa | 1975–1991 | Saudi Arabia |
| Abdurrahim El-Keib | Prime Minister of Libya | Libya | 1976–2011 | United States |
| Michel Micombero | President of Burundi | Burundi | 1976–1983† | Somalia |
| James Mancham | President of the Seychelles | Seychelles | 1977–1992 | United Kingdom |
| Arturo Armando Molina | President of El Salvador | El Salvador | 1977–1992 | United States |
| Abdul Hamid Bakkush | Prime Minister of Libya | Libya | 1977–2007† | Egypt |
| Ange-Félix Patassé | Prime Minister of the Central African Empire | Central African Empire | 1978–1979 | France |
| Ange-Félix Patassé | Prime Minister of the Central African Empire | Central African Republic | 1980–1981 | Chad |
| Ange-Félix Patassé | Prime Minister of the Central African Empire | Central African Republic | 1982–1992 | Togo |
| Ange-Félix Patassé | President of the Central African Republic | Central African Republic | 2003–2009 | Togo |
| Jafar Sharif-Emami | Prime Minister of Iran | Iran | 1978–1998† | United States |
| Gholam Reza Azhari | Prime Minister of Iran | Iran | 1978–2001† | United States |
| Ali Amini | Prime Minister of Iran | Iran | 1979–1992† | France |
| Shapour Bakhtiar | Prime Minister of Iran | Iran | 1979–1991† | France |
| Mohammad Reza Pahlavi | Shah of Iran | Iran | 1979–1980† | Egypt; Morocco; Bahamas; Mexico; United States; Panama; Egypt |
| Idi Amin | President of Uganda | Uganda | 1979–2003† | Libya (1979–1980); Saudi Arabia (1980–2003) |
| Jean-Bédel Bokassa (Bokassa I) | Emperor of Central Africa | Central African Empire | 1979–1986 | Ivory Coast (1979–1983); France (1983–1986) |
| Fred Degazon | President of Dominica | Dominica | 1979–2008† | United Kingdom |
| Félix Malloum | President of Chad | Chad | 1979–2002 | Nigeria |
| Moktar Ould Daddah | President of Mauritania | Mauritania | 1979–2001 | France |
| Anastasio Somoza Debayle | President of Nicaragua | Nicaragua | 1979–1980† | Paraguay |
| Carlos Humberto Romero | President of El Salvador | El Salvador | 1979–unknown | United States |
| Pascal Lissouba | Prime Minister of the Republic of the Congo | Republic of Congo | 1979–1990 | France |
| Pascal Lissouba | President of the Republic of Congo | Republic of Congo | 1997–2020† | United Kingdom (1997–2004); France (2004–2020) |
| Ahmed Ben Bella | President of Algeria | Algeria | 1980–1990 | Switzerland |
| Luís Cabral | President of Guinea-Bissau | Guinea-Bissau | 1980–2009† | Cuba (1980–1984); Portugal (1984–2009) |
| Johan Ferrier | President of Suriname | Suriname | 1980–2010† | Netherlands |
| Ali Zeidan | Prime Minister of Libya | Libya | 1980–2012 | India; Switzerland; Germany |
| Isabel Perón | President of Argentina | Argentina | 1981–present | Spain |
| Abolhassan Banisadr | President of Iran | Iran | 1981–2021† | France |
| Yusuf Zuayyin | Prime Minister of Syria | Syria | 1981–2016† | United Kingdom; Hungary; Sweden |
| Luis García Meza | President of Bolivia | Bolivia | 1981–1995 | Brazil |
| Jean Nguza Karl-i-Bond | First State Commissioner of Zaire | Zaire | 1981–1985 | Belgium |
| Jean Nguza Karl-i-Bond | Prime Minister of Zaire | Zaire | 1996–2003 | South Africa |
| Henk Chin A Sen | President of Suriname | Suriname | 1982–1995 | United States; Netherlands |
| Dương Văn Minh | President of South Vietnam | South Vietnam | 1983–2001† | France; United States |
| Jules Sedney | Prime Minister of Suriname | Suriname | 1983–1987 | Netherlands |
| Ahmadou Ahidjo | President of Cameroon | Cameroon | 1983–1989† | France; Senegal |
| Nguyễn Văn Lộc | Prime Minister of South Vietnam | South Vietnam | 1983–1992† | Singapore; United States; France |
| Benazir Bhutto | Prime Minister of Pakistan | Pakistan | 1984–1987 | United Kingdom |
| Benazir Bhutto | Prime Minister of Pakistan | Pakistan | 1999–2007 | United Arab Emirates |
| Gaafar Nimeiry | President of Sudan | Sudan | 1985–1999 | Egypt |
| Goukouni Oueddei | President of Chad | Chad | 1985–2007 | Libya; Algeria |
| Saeb Salam | Prime Minister of Lebanon | Lebanon | 1985–1994 | Switzerland |
| Jean-Claude Duvalier | President of Haiti | Haiti | 1986–2011 | France |
| Ferdinand Marcos | President of the Philippines | Philippines | 1986–1989† | United States |
| Tito Okello | President of Uganda | Uganda | 1986–1993 | Kenya |
| Jean-Baptiste Bagaza | President of Burundi | Burundi | 1987–1993 | Libya |
| Jean-Baptiste Bagaza | President of Burundi | Burundi | 1998–2002 | Uganda |
| Henri Namphy | President of Haiti | Haiti | 1988–2018† | Dominican Republic |
| Vũ Văn Mẫu | Prime Minister of South Vietnam | South Vietnam | 1988–1998† | France |
| Ahmed al-Mirghani | President of Sudan | Sudan | 1989–2001 | Egypt |
| Alfredo Stroessner | President of Paraguay | Paraguay | 1989–2006† | Brazil |
| Erich Honecker | General Secretary | East Germany | 1989–1994† | Soviet Union (1989–1991); Russia (1991–1992); Chile (1993–1994) |
| Hissène Habré | President of Chad | Chad | 1990–2021† | Senegal |
| Jabir III al-Ahmad al-Jabir al-Sabah | Emir of Kuwait | Kuwait | 1990–1991 | Saudi Arabia |
| Michel Aoun | President of Lebanon | Lebanon | 1990–2005 | France |
| Amine Gemayel | President of Lebanon | Lebanon | 1990–2000 | Switzerland; France; United States |
| Jean-Bertrand Aristide | President of Haiti | Haiti | 1991–1994 | Venezuela; United States |
| Jean-Bertrand Aristide | President of Haiti | Haiti | 2004–2011 | Jamaica (2004); South Africa (2004–2011) |
| Siad Barre | President of Somalia | Somalia | 1991–1995† | Kenya (1991); Nigeria (1991–1995) |
| Chatichai Choonhavan | Prime Minister of Thailand | Thailand | 1991–1992 | United Kingdom |
| Mengistu Haile Mariam | President of Ethiopia | Ethiopia | 1991–present | Zimbabwe |
| Sultan Ali Keshtmand | Chairman of the Council of Ministers of Afghanistan | Afghanistan | 1991–2026† | Russia; United Kingdom |
| Alan García | President of Peru | Peru | 1992–2001 | Colombia; France |
| Ayaz Mutallibov | President of Azerbaijan | Azerbaijan | 1992–2012 | Russia |
| Mohammad Najibullah | President of Afghanistan | Afghanistan | 1992–1996† | United Nations (mission) |
| Joseph Saidu Momoh | President of Sierra Leone | Sierra Leone | 1992–2003† | Guinea |
| Didier Ratsiraka | President of Madagascar | Madagascar | 1993–1996 | France |
| Didier Ratsiraka | President of Madagascar | Madagascar | 2002–2011 | France |
| Jorge Serrano Elías | President of Guatemala | Guatemala | 1993–present | Panama |
| Alikram Hummatov | President of the Talysh-Mughan Autonomous Republic | Talysh-Mughan | 1993–2022† | Netherlands |
| Théodore Sindikubwabo | President of Rwanda | Rwanda | 1994–1998† | Zaire (until 1997); Democratic Republic of the Congo |
| Ali Salem al-Beidh | President of the Democratic Republic of Yemen | Democratic Republic of Yemen | 1994–2026† | Oman; United Arab Emirates |
| Dawda Jawara | President of the Gambia | Gambia | 1994–2002 | Senegal; United Kingdom |
| Abdumalik Abdullajanov | Prime Minister of Tajikistan | Tajikistan | 1994–present | Russia; United States |
| Khalifa bin Hamad Al Thani | Emir of Qatar | Qatar | 1995–2004 | France |
| Carlos Salinas de Gortari | President of Mexico | Mexico | 1995–1999 | United States; Ireland |
| Faustin Twagiramungu | Prime Minister of Rwanda | Rwanda | 1995–2003; 2003–2023† | Belgium |
| Sylvestre Ntibantunganya | President of Burundi | Burundi | 1996–1997 | United States (embassy) |
| Valentine Strasser | Head of State of Sierra Leone | Sierra Leone | 1996–2000 | United Kingdom |
| Burhanuddin Rabbani | President of Afghanistan | Afghanistan | 1996–2001 | Northern Alliance |
| Abdalá Bucaram | President of Ecuador | Ecuador | 1997–2017 | Panama |
| Ahmad Tejan Kabbah | President of Sierra Leone | Sierra Leone | 1997–1998 | Guinea |
| Mobutu Sese Seko | President of Zaire | Zaire | 1997–1997† | Togo; Morocco |
| Akezhan Kazhegeldin | Prime Minister of Kazakhstan | Kazakhstan | 1997–present | United Kingdom |
| Joachim Yhombi-Opango | President of the Republic of Congo | Republic of Congo | 1997–2007 | Benin; Ivory Coast; France |
| Norodom Ranariddh | Prime Minister of Cambodia | Cambodia | 1997–1998 | Philippines; Singapore; Indonesia |
| Norodom Ranariddh | Prime Minister of Cambodia | Cambodia | 2007–2008 | Malaysia |
| Nawaz Sharif | Prime Minister of Pakistan | Pakistan | 1999–2007 | Saudi Arabia; United Kingdom |
| Nawaz Sharif | Prime Minister of Pakistan | Pakistan | 2019–2023 | United Kingdom |
| Henri Konan Bédié | President of Ivory Coast | Ivory Coast | 1999–2001 | Togo; France |
| Raúl Cubas Grau | President of Paraguay | Paraguay | 1999–2002 | Brazil |
| Pavlo Lazarenko | Prime Minister of Ukraine | Ukraine | 1999–present | United States |
| Carlos Andrés Pérez | President of Venezuela | Venezuela | 1999–2010† | Dominican Republic; United States |
| João Bernardo Vieira | President of Guinea-Bissau | Guinea-Bissau | 1999–2005 | Portugal |
| Jamil Mahuad | President of Ecuador | Ecuador | 2000–present | United States |
| Pierre-Célestin Rwigema | Prime Minister of Rwanda | Rwanda | 2000–2011 | United States |
| Alberto Fujimori | President of Peru | Peru | 2000–2007 | Japan (2000–2005); Chile (2005–2007) |
| André Kolingba | President of the Central African Republic | Central African Republic | 2001–2003 | Uganda |
| André Kolingba | President of the Central African Republic | Central African Republic | 2003–2010† | France |
| Mullah Omar | Supreme Leader of Afghanistan | Afghanistan | 2001–2013† | Zabul Province, Afghanistan (in hiding) |
| Abdul Kabir | Acting Prime Minister of Afghanistan | Afghanistan | 2001–2021 | Pakistan |
| Pedro Carmona | Acting President of Venezuela | Venezuela | 2002–present | Colombia (2002–2023); Spain (2023–present) |
| Gonzalo Sánchez de Lozada | President of Bolivia | Bolivia | 2003–present | United States |
| Charles Taylor | President of Liberia | Liberia | 2003–2006 | Nigeria |
| Martin Ziguélé | Prime Minister of the Central African Republic | Central African Republic | 2003–2005 | France |
| Jean-Paul Ngoupandé | Prime Minister of the Central African Republic | Central African Republic | 2003–2005 | France |
| Gustavo Noboa | President of Ecuador | Ecuador | 2003–2005 | Dominican Republic |
| Norodom Sihanouk | King of Cambodia | Cambodia | 2004–2012† | China; North Korea |
| Askar Akayev | President of Kyrgyzstan | Kyrgyzstan | 2005–present | Russia |
| Nikolai Tanayev | Prime Minister of Kyrgyzstan | Kyrgyzstan | 2005–2020† | Russia |
| Lucio Gutiérrez | President of Ecuador | Ecuador | 2005–2006 | Brazil; Peru; United States |
| Ian Smith | Prime Minister of Rhodesia | Rhodesia/Zimbabwe | 2005–2007† | South Africa |
| Maaouya Ould Sid'Ahmed Taya | President of Mauritania | Mauritania | 2005–present | Gambia (2005); Qatar (2005–present) |
| Thaksin Shinawatra | Prime Minister of Thailand | Thailand | 2006–2008; 2008–2023 | United States; United Kingdom; Singapore; China; Hong Kong; Cambodia; United Arab Emirates |
| Pervez Musharraf | President of Pakistan | Pakistan | 2008–2013; 2016–2023† | United Arab Emirates |
| Marc Ravalomanana | President of Madagascar | Madagascar | 2009–2014 | Swaziland (2009); South Africa (2009–2014) |
| Manuel Zelaya | President of Honduras | Honduras | 2009–2011 | Costa Rica (2009); Dominican Republic (2010–2011) |
| Kurmanbek Bakiyev | President of Kyrgyzstan | Kyrgyzstan | 2010–present | Belarus |
| Zine El Abidine Ben Ali | President of Tunisia | Tunisia | 2011–2019† | Saudi Arabia |
| Amadou Toumani Touré | President of Mali | Mali | 2012–2017 | Senegal |
| François Bozizé | President of the Central African Republic | Central African Republic | 2013–2019 | Cameroon |
| Michel Djotodia | President of the Central African Republic | Central African Republic | 2014–2020 | Benin |
| Tom Thabane | Prime Minister of Lesotho | Lesotho | August–September 2014 | South Africa |
| Viktor Yanukovych | President of Ukraine | Ukraine | 2014–present | Russia |
| Mykola Azarov | Prime Minister of Ukraine | Ukraine | 2014–present | Russia |
| Mikheil Saakashvili | President of Georgia | Georgia | 2014–2021 | United States; Ukraine; Netherlands; Ukraine |
| Mauricio Funes | President of El Salvador | El Salvador | 2014–2025† | Nicaragua |
| Blaise Compaoré | President of Burkina Faso | Burkina Faso | 2014–present | Ivory Coast; Morocco |
| Abd Rabbuh Mansur Hadi | President of Yemen | Yemen | 2015–2026† (Note: Continued to direct Yemen's internationally-recognized government, which controlled large parts of the country in the civil war, from Saudi Arabia until his resignation in 2022) | Saudi Arabia |
| Yahya Jammeh | President of the Gambia | Gambia | 2017–present | Equatorial Guinea |
| Rafael Correa | President of Ecuador | Ecuador | 2017–present | Belgium |
| Yingluck Shinawatra | Prime Minister of Thailand | Thailand | 2017–present | Singapore; United Kingdom; United Arab Emirates |
| Yevgeny Shevchuk | President of Transnistria | Transnistria (Note: Breakaway state internationally recognized by all UN members as part of Moldova.) | 2017–present | Moldova; Russia |
| Nikola Gruevski | Prime Minister of Macedonia | Macedonia | 2018–present | Hungary |
| Evo Morales | President of Bolivia | Bolivia | 2019–2020 | Mexico; Argentina |
| Guillaume Soro | Prime Minister of Ivory Coast | Ivory Coast | 2019–present | France; Belgium; United Arab Emirates |
| Salvador Sánchez Cerén | President of El Salvador | El Salvador | 2020–present | Nicaragua |
| Juan Carlos I | King of Spain | Spain | 2020–present | United Arab Emirates |
| Ashraf Ghani | President of Afghanistan | Afghanistan | 2021–present | United Arab Emirates |
| Ian Khama | President of Botswana | Botswana | 2021–2024 | South Africa |
| Gotabaya Rajapaksa | President of Sri Lanka | Sri Lanka | July–September 2022 | Maldives; Singapore; Thailand |
| Paul-Henri Sandaogo Damiba | Interim President of Burkina Faso | Burkina Faso | 2022–present | Togo |
| Succès Masra | Prime Minister of Chad | Chad | 2022–2023 | United States |
| Jair Bolsonaro | President of Brazil | Brazil | 2022–2023 | United States |
| Joseph Kabila | President of the Democratic Republic of the Congo | DR Congo | 2023–2025 | South Africa |
| Violeta Chamorro | President of Nicaragua | Nicaragua | 2023–2025† | Costa Rica |
| Ernest Bai Koroma | President of Sierra Leone | Sierra Leone | 2024–present | Nigeria |
| Sheikh Hasina | Prime Minister of Bangladesh | Bangladesh | 2024–present | India |
| Bashar al-Assad | President of Syria | Syria | 2024–present | Russia |
| Ricardo Martinelli | President of Panama | Panama | 2025–present | Colombia |
| Ali Bongo | President of Gabon | Gabon | 2025–present | Angola |
| Andry Rajoelina | President of Madagascar | Madagascar | 2025–present | Réunion; United Arab Emirates |
| Umaro Sissoco Embalo | President of Guinea-Bissau | Guinea-Bissau | 2025–present | Senegal; Congo |
