= Æthelbert of York =

Archbishop of York from 766 to 780

Æthelbert
- Archbishop of York
- Appointed: 766
- Term ended: 8 November 780
- Predecessor: Ecgbert
- Successor: Eanbald I

Orders
- Consecration: 24 April 767

Personal details
- Died: 8 November 780

Æthelbert (Note: Sometimes Æthelberht, Albert, Ælberht, Aethelberht, or Ælbert) (died 8 November 780) was an eighth-century scholar, teacher, and Archbishop of York. Related to his predecessor at York, he became a monk at an early age and was in charge of the cathedral's library and school before becoming archbishop. He taught a number of missionaries and scholars, including Alcuin, at the school. While archbishop, Æthelbert sent missionaries to the Continent. Æthelbert retired before his death, and during his retirement consecrated another church in York.

== Early life ==
Æthelbert was the teacher and intimate friend of Alcuin, whose poem on the saints and prelates of the Church of York, Versus de Patribus Regibus et de Sanctis et Pontificibus Ecclesiæ Eboracensis, is the principal source of information concerning Æthelbert's life. He was a kinsman of his predecessor Ecgbert, who was brother to Eadberht, King of Northumbria. Æthelbert's family placed him in a monastery as a young child, where he was a pupil in the school founded at York by Ecgbert. Ecgbert ordained Æthelbert as a priest put him in charge of the school.

Æthelbert was instrumental in forming a library at York, which was probably the largest contemporary collection of books to be found in Europe outside of Rome. Alcuin mentions several Latin and Greek classical authors, as well as the Fathers and other Christian writers that formed the 8th century canon. Æthelbert, in his search for books, travelled far, and we know that he visited Rome among other places. Alcuin's poem Versus lists 41 different authors, including some who wrote in Hebrew. He taught both the trivium as well as the quadrivium, plus how to figure the dates of church festivals and natural science.

== Archbishop ==
In 766 Æthelbert succeeded Ecgbert as archbishop; he was consecrated 24 April 767, the feast day of his predecessor Wilfrid. This may have been deliberate and a sign that Æthelbert wished to revive Wilfrid's ambitions for the archiepiscopal see. Æthelbert received his pallium from Pope Adrian I in 773. Alcuin was appointed head of the cathedral school after Æthelbert became archbishop. Much of Alcuin's description of Æthelbert's time as archbishop has the flavour of a panegyric, as Alcuin praised Æthelbert as a model bishop suitable for other bishops to use as a role model. Alcuin praised Æthelbert and his predecessor Ecgbert for adorning various churches of York and for giving splendid ornaments to York Minster.

Æthelbert also commissioned Eanbald and Alcuin the job of overseeing the construction of a new church in York, the basilica of Alma Sophia, the Church of Holy Wisdom. It was possibly modelled on the Frankish royal chapel of Aachen, or the rotunda of San Vitale in Ravenna. According to Alcuin, Alma Sophia was lofty, supported by many columns and arches, with inlaid ceilings and glazed windows. The core church was surrounded by chapels and galleries, and it boasted thirty altars. Alma Sophia was never mentioned again in written records, and no remains have ever been found. Academic debate is split on whether it was next door to the pre-Norman Conquest cathedral, or whether it was elsewhere in the city, perhaps across the river Ouse: possible sites include Bishopshill, or Holy Trinity, Micklegate.

Æthelbert sent out missionaries to the pagans of Northern Europe, among them Alubert and Liudger, who went to northern Germany. Liudger had earlier been a pupil at the school in York, and went on to become the first Bishop of Munster. Æthelbert was the recipient of letters from one of the missionaries – Lull, the Archbishop of Mainz, assuming that Lull's correspondent "Coena", who is an archbishop and who was being asked for the works of Bede, is actually Æthelbert, as most historians seem convinced of. (Note: If this is correct, "Coena" was likely a nickname of Æthelbert's.) Books were sent to the missionaries from the York library. (Note: The library was likely destroyed in 866 and 867 when the Danes burnt the city of York and the cathedral.)

In 774, Æthelbert called a council which deposed Alhred, the King of Northumbria, and sent the ex-king north into exile with the Picts. The cause of the deposition may have been related to missionary work. The historian D. P. Kirby feels that Æthelbert was not a supporter of Alhred prior to his deposition. Alhred was replaced with Æthelred, who was replaced in 778 by Ælfwald, the son of Oswulf. Kirby sees Æthelbert's withdrawal of support as instrumental in the deposition of Æthelred, noting that Ælfwald was closely related to Æthelbert, unlike both Alhred and Æthelred. Kirby also notes that medieval chroniclers noted that Æthelbert is said to have not "spared evil kings".

== Retirement and death ==
Æthelbert retired some time before his death, consecrating Eanbald as his successor. The exact date this occurred is unclear. Alcuin gives a date corresponding to July 778, but it could be 777 too. Eanbald's position may have just been as an associate bishop, with Æthelbert remaining in office until his death while sharing the office with Eanbald. He lived long enough to consecrate the new church of Alma Sophia, ten days before his death on 8 November.

== See also ==
- Accord of Winchester

== Citations ==
Christian titles
Preceded by Ecgbert	Archbishop of York; 766–780	Succeeded by Eanbald I
