= Osred II of Northumbria =

Osred II

King of Northumbria
- Reign: 788–790
- Predecessor: Ælfwald I
- Successor: Æthelred (2nd reign)
- Died: 792
- Burial: Tynemouth Priory
- Father: Alhred
- Mother: Osgifu

Osred II was King of Northumbria from 788 to 790. He was the son of Alhred and Osgifu, daughter of Eadberht.

He succeeded Ælfwald, son of his mother's brother Oswulf, who was murdered by the patricius (ealdorman) Sicga.

Osred, even though he united two of the competing factions in Northumbria, was king for only a year before being deposed in favour of the previously deposed Æthelred son of Æthelwald Moll. Osred was then forcibly tonsured and exiled, apparently to the Isle of Man.

He returned from exile in 792, but was abandoned by his soldiers and murdered on order of King Æthelred, who had had Ælf and Ælfwine, sons of Ælfwald, killed the previous year, and had attempted to kill Eardwulf in 790. The Anglo-Saxon Chronicle reports that he was "apprehended and slain on the eighteenth day before the calends of October. His body is deposited at Tynemouth."

== Sources ==
- Higham, N.J., The Kingdom of Northumbria AD 350-1100. Stroud: Sutton, 1993. ISBN 0-86299-730-5
- Yorke, Barbara, Kings and Kingdoms of early Anglo-Saxon England. London: Seaby, 1990. ISBN 1-85264-027-8

Preceded by Ælfwald I	King of Northumbria	Succeeded by Æthelred (2nd reign)
