= Eardwulf of Northumbria =

Eardwulf

King of Northumbria
- 1st Reign: 14 May 796 – 806
- Coronation: 26 May 796
- Predecessor: Osbald
- Successor: Ælfwald II
- 2nd Reign: 808
- Predecessor: Ælfwald II
- Successor: Eanred
- Died: after 808
- Burial: Breedon on the Hill?
- Issue: Eanred
- Father: Eardwulf

Eardwulf (fl. 790 – c. 830) was king of Northumbria from 796 to 806, when he was deposed and went into exile. He may have had a second reign from 808 until perhaps 811 or 830. Northumbria in the last years of the eighth century was the scene of dynastic strife between several noble families: in 790, king Æthelred I attempted to have Eardwulf assassinated. Eardwulf's survival may have been viewed as a sign of divine favour. A group of nobles conspired to assassinate Æthelred in April 796 and he was succeeded by Osbald: Osbald's reign lasted only twenty-seven days before he was deposed and Eardwulf became king on 14 May 796.

Little is recorded of Eardwulf's family, though his father, also named Eardwulf, is known to have been a nobleman. Eardwulf was married by the time he became king, though his wife's name is not recorded. It is possible he later wed an illegitimate daughter of Charlemagne. In 798, early in his reign, Eardwulf fought a battle at Billington Moor against a nobleman named Wada, who had been one of those who killed King Æthelred. Wada was defeated and driven into exile. In 801, Eardwulf led an army against Coenwulf of Mercia, perhaps because of Coenwulf's support for other claimants to the Northumbrian throne.

Eardwulf was deposed in 806 and according to a Frankish record, returned to his kingdom in 808. No record has survived of his death or the end of his reign: dates from 811 to 830 have been suggested. He was possibly buried at the Mercian royal monastery of Breedon on the Hill, which carries a dedication to Saint Mary and Saint Hardulph, with whom Eardwulf is identified by several historians.

== Background ==
The kingdoms of Britain in around 800

During the latter half of the eighth century, the Northumbrian succession included a long series of murdered and deposed kings, as several royal lines contended for the throne. The main lines were those of Eadberht, Æthelwald Moll and Alhred. In the eight years before Eardwulf's accession, all three of these dynastic lines were involved in the struggle for kingship: on 23 September 788, King Ælfwald I, grandson of Eadberht, was murdered by the patricius Sicga near Hexham, and Ælfwald's cousin Osred became king. Osred, who was of Alhred's line, was deposed after a year, and Æthelred, son of Æthelwald Moll, who had been deposed in 778 at a young age, was restored to the kingship, resuming the title Æthelred I.

Some Anglo-Saxon kings are known to have been killed by their households or in open warfare against rivals, but overall the record is very sparse. The evidence as regards the deposition of kings is equally limited. Only two eighth-century depositions offer any context, those of Æthelwald Moll in Northumbria and Sigeberht of Wessex. In both cases the decision is presented as that of some form of council.

This record of disputed succession was by no means unique to Northumbria, and the kingdoms of Mercia and Wessex experienced similar troubles during the eighth and ninth centuries. In Wessex, from the death of Centwine in 685 to Egbert's seizure of power in 802, the relationships between successive kings are far from clear and few kings are known to have been close kinsmen of their predecessors or successors. The same may be true of Mercia from the death of Ceolred in 716 until the disappearance of the Mercian kingdom in the late ninth century.

Kings did not rule alone, but rather governed together with the leading churchmen and nobles. While Northumbria lacks the body of charters which shed light on the institutions of the southern Anglo-Saxon kingdoms, sufficient evidence survives for historians to reconstruct some aspects of Northumbrian political life. The evidence for Northumbria survives largely in Latin documents, and these use the words dux and patricius to describe the leading noblemen of the kingdom. The word dux is usually translated by the Old English word ealdorman. The historian Alan Thacker estimates that there were about eight men holding the title of dux in late Northumbria. The title patricius is usually translated as patrician, which ultimately means noble, but in the latter days of the Roman Empire represented a high-ranking position, second only to the emperor. The meaning of the title in Northumbria is unclear, but it appears that there was only one patricius. While it may be simply an alternative to dux, it might represent a position approximating to that of the Mayor of the Palace in late Merovingian Francia.

The church in Northumbria was one of the major landowners, perhaps second only to the king. At the head of the Northumbrian church was the Archbishop of York, an office held by Eanbald I to 796, Eanbald II until some time after 808, and then by Wulfsige to around 830. Immediately below the archbishop were three bishops: the bishop of Lindisfarne, the bishop of Hexham and the bishop of Whithorn. The typically long term of office of senior clerics meant that kings often had to work with men appointed by their predecessors, with whom their relations might be difficult.

== Relations with other states ==
Northumbria's southern neighbour Mercia was, under the rule of kings Æthelbald, Offa and Coenwulf, the dominant kingdom in Anglo-Saxon England. Offa, the greatest of the three, ruled Mercia until 796, followed soon after by Coenwulf. Offa's dominance was secured in part by marriage alliances with the other major kingdoms: Beorhtric of Wessex and Æthelred of Northumbria were married to his daughters. Further afield, Charlemagne, the pre-eminent ruler in the Christian West, appears to have taken an active interest in Northumbrian affairs. Charlemagne initially ruled Francia and parts of Italy, but by 796 had become master of an empire which stretched from the Atlantic Ocean to the Great Hungarian Plain. He was a staunch defender of the Papacy, and in the popes and the church hierarchy he had allies whose influence extended to Northumbria and beyond. Events in southern Britain to 796 have sometimes been portrayed as a struggle between Offa and Charlemagne, but the disparity in their power was enormous, and Offa and then Coenwulf were clearly minor figures by comparison.

Early evidence of friendly relations between Charlemagne and Offa is tempered by signs of strain. Charlemagne sheltered two exiles from England at his court: Odberht of Kent (probably Eadberht Praen) and Egbert of Wessex. Eadberht Praen ruled the Kingdom of Kent for a short time after Offa's death, but was deposed by Coenwulf. Egbert was more successful, taking and holding the throne of Wessex in 802. It is clear that Mercian and Frankish interests could not always be reconciled and Frankish policy then moved towards support for Offa's opponents. To Charlemagne this primarily meant Northumbria: according to Patrick Wormald, "Charlemagne ... saw England as if it were ruled by two kings only: Æthelred ruling Northumbria and Offa ruling everything to the south". Frankish support for Northumbria thus appears to have been driven by a desire to counter Mercian influence in southern Britain, an area with long-standing ties to Francia. It has also been suggested that Charlemagne's interest in Northumbria was motivated by a desire for co-operation against Viking raiders, who had first appeared in Northumbria in the early 790s. Alternatively it may be that Charlemagne's conception of the sphere of his authority included Britain, which had once been part of the Roman Empire.

Initially, both Charlemagne and Offa appear to have shared a common interest in supporting King Æthelred, Offa's son-in-law. Shortly before Æthelred was murdered in 796, an embassy from Francia delivered gifts for the king and his bishops. When Charlemagne learned of Æthelred's killing he was enraged, called the Northumbrians "that treacherous, perverse people...who murder their own lords", and threatened retribution. His ambassadors, who had travelled on to Ireland and were then returning home, were ordered back to Northumbria to recover the presents. Charlemagne in time became a supporter of Eardwulf. Eardwulf is said by the early 12th-century Annals of Lindisfarne and Durham to have married one of Charlemagne's daughters, information not found in other sources. If this is correct she must have been illegitimate, as the marriages of all the legitimate daughters are known. Coenwulf, on the other hand, who became king of Mercia shortly after Eardwulf's accession, is recorded as having fought with Eardwulf in 801.

== Early life and accession ==
Eardwulf was not, so far as is known, connected to any of the factions that had been warring for the throne up to the mid-790s. Nothing is definitely known of his background, though Symeon of Durham's History of the Kings, an early twelfth-century work based on the lost late tenth-century chronicle of Byrhtferth, records that his father's name was also Eardwulf, and both father and son are given the title dux. Historian Barbara Yorke has proposed that he was a descendant of one Eanwine who (according to Symeon of Durham) was killed in 740 on the orders of King Eadberht. This Eanwine may be identified with King Eadwulf's son of the same name. Eardwulf's father may have been one of the two Eardwulfs whose deaths are recorded by Symeon of Durham in 774 and 775.

Eardwulf appears to have been an enemy of Æthelred I. He first appears in the historical record circa 790, when Symeon of Durham reports that:

Eardulf was taken prisoner, and conveyed to Ripon, and there ordered by the aforesaid king [Æthelred] to be put to death without the gate of the monastery. The brethren carried his body into the church with Gregorian chanting, and placed it out of doors in a tent; after midnight he was found alive in the church.

A letter from Alcuin to Eardwulf suggests that this fortunate recovery was seen as being miraculous.

Eardwulf's whereabouts after his recovery are not known. In surviving King Æthelred's anger he was more fortunate than Ælfwald's sons, who were drowned on Æthelred's orders in 791. Osred returned from exile but was betrayed, and killed by Æthelred's command on 14 September 792. Æthelred himself was assassinated on 18 April 796, perhaps at Corbridge, by conspirators led by the dux Ealdred. Æthelred was followed as king by Osbald, whose antecedents are unknown; he was deposed after twenty-seven days and fled to the land of the Picts with a few supporters.

== King ==
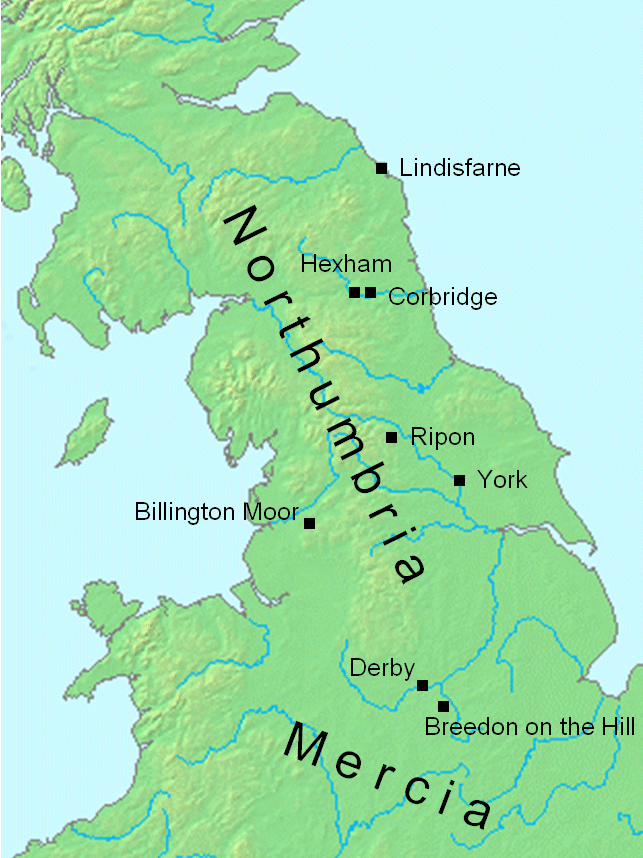
Northumbria in Eardwulf's reign

Eardwulf became king on 14 May 796. The Anglo-Saxon Chronicle records that he was consecrated by Eanbald I, Archbishop of York, and Bishops Æthelberht, Beadwulf and Hygebald, at York Minster on 26 May 796.

Eardwulf was evidently married before he became king, as Alcuin reproached him for abandoning his wife for a concubine soon after his coronation. This strained relations with the new archbishop, Eanbald II—Eanbald I had died in the year of Eardwulf's coronation. Alcuin, while condemning secular oppression of the church, affected surprise that while the Archbishop Eanbald was travelling he was accompanied by a large retinue, including soldiers, and that he received and protected the king's enemies. Eanbald was presumably in conflict with Eardwulf over property, but it is likely that he also supported rivals for Eardwulf's throne.

Although Æthelred had been Eardwulf's enemy, Æthelred's killers proved to be equally hostile to Eardwulf. In 798 a dux named Wada, who was one of those who had killed King Æthelred, fought with Eardwulf on Billington Moor, near Whalley, Lancashire. Wada was put to flight and may have gone into exile in Mercia. He may have hoped to restore Osbald to the throne. The evidence for Osbald's continued ambition is a letter that Alcuin wrote to him, probably in 798, in which Alcuin attempted to dissuade Osbald from further interventions in Northumbrian affairs. Alcuin's arguments appear to have succeeded, since Osbald is known to have become an abbot by 799 (when his death is recorded), implying that he had given up his ambitions.

Two further challenges to Eardwulf are recorded within the next two years, both apparently from among the noble lines that had been fighting for the throne over the previous decades. In 799, a dux named Moll was killed by Eardwulf's "urgent command". Moll's name has suggested that he was a kinsman of the late King Æthelred, whose father was Æthelwald Moll. The following year, Ealhmund, "the son of King Alhred, as some say", was killed by Eardwulf's men. Ealhmund was remembered at Derby, in the neighbouring kingdom of Mercia, as a saint.

King Coenwulf of Mercia may have supported the unfortunate Ealhmund, and Symeon of Durham wrote that in 801:

Eardwulf, king of the Northumbrians, led an army against Coenwulf, king of Mercians, because he had given asylum to his enemies. He also, collecting an army, obtained very many auxiliaries from other provinces, having made a long expedition among them. At length, with the advice of the bishops and chiefs of the Angles on either side, they made peace through the kindness of the king of the Angles.

This settlement ended open warfare, but Eardwulf was deposed in 806, in unknown circumstances. Letters between Charlemagne and Pope Leo III suggest that Coenwulf had a hand in Eardwulf's removal. According to the thirteenth-century chronicler Roger of Wendover, Eardwulf was replaced by King Ælfwald II, about whom nothing else is known from the written sources, although coins issued in his reign have survived.

As the case of Ælfwald shows, while the written sources for later Northumbria are few and often written down centuries after the events they describe, archaeological evidence from coinage is independent of the surviving annals. Anglo-Saxon coins usually named the king on whose orders they were issued and sometimes named the mint where they were struck—Northumbrian coinage names York as the place of issue—and the moneyer who produced them. Their weight and silver content can be compared with other reigns, providing a hint of the prevailing economic conditions, and the style and size may also throw light on cultural influences when the coins are compared with those of neighbouring kingdoms and with other forms of art. The evidence of Northumbrian coinage is particularly valuable in the ninth century, when contemporary written evidence all but disappears.

From the 740s until the end of the Northumbrian kingdom, coins were issued by most kings, although in variable quantities. Until recently no coins from Eardwulf's reign were known, which suggested that it may have been a time of instability, or perhaps that the kingdom was impoverished by the payment of tribute to Offa and Coenwulf of Mercia. It is now known that the issue of new coins continued during Eardwulf's reign, as two of his coins were identified in the 1990s. Issues of new currency appear to have been limited under Eardwulf, and significant numbers of Northumbrian coins are not again attested until the reign of Eardwulf's son Eanred.

== Exile and return ==
Like many of his predecessors, Eardwulf took to exile when he was deposed. Unlike kings with ties to Lindisfarne, who appear to have chosen exile among the Picts, Eardwulf was linked to Ripon and chose a southerly exile. The next reports of Eardwulf are in Frankish sources:

Meanwhile the king of the Northumbrians from the island of Britain, Eardwulf by name, being expelled from his kingdom and native land, came to the emperor while he was still at Nijmegen, and after he had made known the reason for his coming, he set out for Rome; and on his return from Rome he was escorted by envoys of the Roman pontiff and of the lord emperor back into his kingdom. At that time Leo III ruled over the Roman church, and his messenger, the deacon Ealdwulf from that same Britain, a Saxon by race, was sent to Britain, and with him two abbots, Hruotfrid the notary and Nantharius of St. Omer, sent by the emperor.

A surviving letter of Leo III to Charlemagne confirms that Eardwulf visited Rome and stayed at Charlemagne's court.

The Frankish source is clear that Eardwulf was "returned to his kingdom", but surviving Anglo-Saxon sources have no record of a second reign. Historians disagree as to whether Ælfwald was replaced by Eardwulf, who would thus have reigned a second time from 808 to 811 or 812, or whether the reign of Eardwulf's son Eanred began in 808.

Recent studies, based on the discovery of a penny of Eanred for which a date no earlier than c. 850 is proposed, suggest a very different dating for ninth-century Northumbrian kings. From this, it is argued that Eardwulf's second reign ended circa 830, rather than in the years soon after 810, and that the reigns of subsequent kings should be re-dated accordingly: Eanred from 830 to 854, Æthelred II from 854 to 862, Rædwulf in 858, and Osberht from 862 to 867.

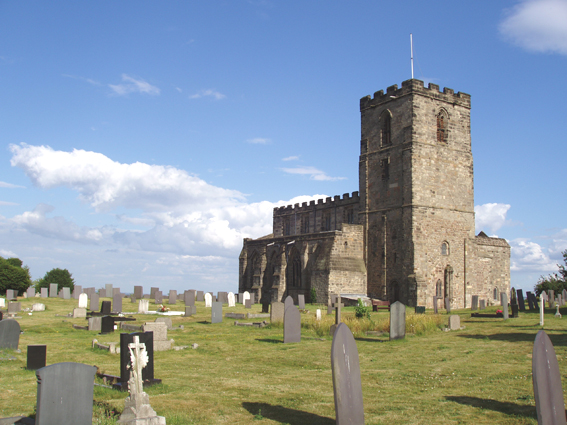
The church of Saint Mary and Saint Hardulph, Breedon on the Hill

Eardwulf is identified by historians with the Saint Hardulph or Hardulf, to whom the Mercian royal church of Saint Mary and Saint Hardulph at Breedon on the Hill is dedicated. The connection, though unproven, has been made by several historians and is uncontroversial. Supporting evidence comes from a twelfth-century list of the burial places of saints compiled at Peterborough. This calls the Saint Hardulph to whom Breedon was dedicated "Hardulfus rex"—King Eardwulf—and states that he was buried at Breedon.

A panelled stone structure in the church, carved with processions of bearded and robed figures under arches, seems to reproduce details found in the Book of Cerne, a work associated with Bishop Æthelwold of Lichfield (818–830). The panels, which may originally have been the outer part of a sarcophagus built to hold the remains of a high status person such as Saint Hardulph, are dated by their similarity to the illustrations in the Book of Cerne to the first third of the ninth century. According to a medieval calendar of saints, the Benedictine monks at Breedon celebrated Hardulph's feast day on 21 August.

The death of Eardwulf is not recorded. Although he had faced considerable opposition and had been driven into exile, he succeeded in founding a dynasty. His son Eanred and grandson Æthelred (II) ruled Northumbria for most of its remaining existence as an independent kingdom.

== Sources ==
=== Primary sources ===
- Swanton, Michael (1996). The Anglo-Saxon Chronicle. New York: Routledge. ISBN 0-415-92129-5.
- Symeon of Durham (1855). J. Stevenson (ed.). The Historical Works of Simeon of Durham. Church Historians of England. Vol. III, part II. London: Seeley's.

=== Secondary sources ===
- Blackburn, Mark & Grierson, Philip, Medieval European Coinage. Cambridge: Cambridge University Press, reprinted with corrections 2006. ISBN 0-521-03177-X
- Brown, Michelle P.; Farr, Carol Ann, eds. (2001). Mercia, an Anglo-Saxon Kingdom in Europe. New York: Leicester University Press. ISBN 0-8264-7765-8.
- Campbell, James (2000). "Elements in the Background to the Life of Saint Cuthbert and his early cult". The Anglo-Saxon State. London: Hambledon. pp. 85–106. ISBN 1-85285-176-7.
- Campbell, John; John, Eric; Wormald, Patrick (1982). The Anglo-Saxons. London: Phaidon. ISBN 0-14-014395-5.
- Forsman, Deanna (2003). "An Appeal to Rome: Anglo-Saxon Dispute Settlement, 800–810". The Heroic Age (6).
- Higham, Nick J. (1993). The Kingdom of Northumbria AD 350–1100. Stroud: Sutton. ISBN 0-86299-730-5.
- Lapidge, Michael, ed. (1999). The Blackwell Encyclopedia of Anglo-Saxon England. Oxford: Blackwell Publishing. ISBN 0-631-22492-0.
- Kendrick, T.D. (1972) [1938]. Anglo-Saxon Art to A.D. 900. London: Methuen. ISBN 0-06-480457-7.
- Kirby, D.P. (1991). The Earliest English Kings. London: Unwin Hyman. ISBN 0-04-445691-3.
- Nelson, Janet (2001). "Carolingian Contacts". In Brown, Michelle; Farr, Carole (eds.). Mercia, an Anglo-Saxon Kingdom in Europe. New York: Leicester University Press. pp. 126–143. ISBN 0-8264-7765-8.
- Levison, Wilhelm (1946). England and the Continent in the Eighth Century. Oxford: Clarendon Press. ISBN 0-19-821232-1.
- Plunkett, Steven J. (1998). "The Mercian Perspective". In Foster, Sally M. (ed.). The St Andrews Sarcophagus: A Pictish masterpiece and its international connections. Dublin: Four Courts. pp. 202–226. ISBN 1-85182-414-6.
- Riché, Pierre (1983). Les Carolingiens: Une famille qui fit l'Europe (in French). Paris: Hachette. ISBN 2-01-278851-3.
- Rollason, David (2004). "Eardwulf (fl. 796–c.830), king of Northumbria". Oxford Dictionary of National Biography. Oxford University Press.
- Stenton, Frank M. (1971). Anglo-Saxon England (3rd ed.). Oxford: Oxford University Press. ISBN 0-19-280139-2.
- Story, Joanna (2003). Carolingian Connections: Anglo-Saxon England and Carolingian Francia, c. 750–870. Aldershot: Ashgate. ISBN 0-7546-0124-2.
- Webster, Leslie; Backhouse, Janet (1991). The Making of England: Anglo-Saxon Art and Culture AD 600–900. London: British Museum Press. ISBN 0-7141-0555-4.
- Williams, Ann; Smyth, Alfred; Kirby, D.P. (1991). A Biographical Dictionary of Dark Age Britain. London: Seaby. ISBN 1-85264-047-2.
- Wormald, Francis (1939). English Benedictine Kalendars after A.D. 1100, volume 1: Abbotsbury–Durham. Henry Bradshaw Society. Vol. 77. London: Harrison & Sons. OCLC 689488.
- Wormald, Patrick (1982). "The Age of Offa and Alcuin". In James Campbell; et al. (eds.). The Anglo-Saxons. London: Phaidon. pp. 101–131. ISBN 0-14-014395-5.
- Yorke, Barbara (1990). Kings and Kingdoms of Early Anglo-Saxon England. London: Seaby. ISBN 1-85264-027-8.
