= Eanbald (died 796) =

Archbishop of York from 780 to 796

Eanbald I of York
- Archbishop of York
- Elected: 780
- Term ended: 10 August 796
- Predecessor: Æthelbert
- Successor: Eanbald II

Orders
- Consecration: c. 780

Personal details
- Born: unknown
- Died: 10 August 796
- Buried: York Minster

Eanbald I of York (Note: Usually known as Eanbald I to distinguish him from a later archbishop also named Eanbald ( Eanbald II)) died on 10 August 796, was an 8th-century Archbishop of York.

== Early life ==
Eanbald was a fellow student at York with Alcuin under Æthelbert, his predecessor at York. Alcuin called him a "brother and most faithful friend." Ethelbert put Alcuin and Eanbald in charge of rebuilding York Minster, as the duties of archbishop kept Ethelbert from handling the details.

== Archbishop ==
Eanbald was elected Archbishop of York in 780. Alcuin was sent by King Ælfwald I of Northumbria to retrieve Eanbald's pallium from Pope Adrian I in Rome.

In 786 Eanbald presided over a church synod held in Northumbria with two papal legates from Adrian I and the king. Among the canons adopted were ones that debarred illegitimate children from inheriting kingdoms, that priests must not celebrate Mass while bare-legged, that bishops should not debate secular affairs at church councils, that there should be a clear difference between canons, monks, and laymen in dress and deportment, and that tithes must be given by all men to the Church. He also probably presided over councils held in 782, 787, and 788. Shortly before his death, he consecrated the new king Eardwulf of Northumbria.

Eanbald's time as archbishop was a time of political instability in the Northumbrian kingdom. The synod of 786 condemned regicide, probably because of the number of kings and royal kin that had been killed in the political struggles taking place in the kingdom of Northumbria. His archbishopric also witnessed the first attacks of the Danes on Northumbria. The country was so widely ravaged that in 790, the Yorkist scholar, Alcuin, deserted the city for the Frankish Court of Charlemagne.

== Later life and death ==
On 26 May 796, Eanbald consecrated Ælfwald of Northumbria as king at York. Eanbald died at the monastery of Etlete or Edete on 10 August 796, the monastery's exact location has not been determined. He was buried in York Minster.

== Citations ==
Christian titles
Preceded by Æthelbert	Archbishop of York; 780–796	Succeeded by Eanbald II
