= Wilfrid II (bishop of York) =

Bishop of York from 718 to 732, Christian saint

- Bishop of York
- Appointed: 718
- Term ended: 732
- Predecessor: John of Beverley
- Successor: Ecgbert

Orders
- Consecration: 718

Personal details
- Died: 29 April either 745 or 746

Sainthood
- Feast day: 29 April
- Venerated in: Roman Catholic Church; Anglican Communion

Wilfrid II (died on 29 April in either 745 or 746), name also spelled Wilfrith, also known as Wilfrid the Younger, was the last bishop of York, as the see was converted to an archbishopric during the time of his successor.

== Life ==
Wilfrid was a monk at Whitby and studied there when Hilda was abbess. In 718 he was consecrated as coadjutor bishop to John of Beverley.

Wilfrid was described as a very holy man, and interested in education.

Wilfrid resigned the bishopric in 732. He died on 29 April in either 745 or 746, and was buried at Ripon, but it may have been his body that was later translated to Canterbury in the mistaken belief that it was that of the earlier Wilfrid. The younger Wilfrid is considered a saint, with his feast day being 29 April. However, he was never the object of strong cult, and only occasional mentions of him occur in martyrologies.

== Citations ==
Christian titles
Preceded by John of Beverley	Bishop of York; 718–732	Succeeded by Ecgbert
