= Osbald of Northumbria =

King of Northumbria for 27 days in 796

Osbald

King of Northumbria
- Reign: 796
- Predecessor: Æthelred I
- Successor: Eardwulf
- Died: 799

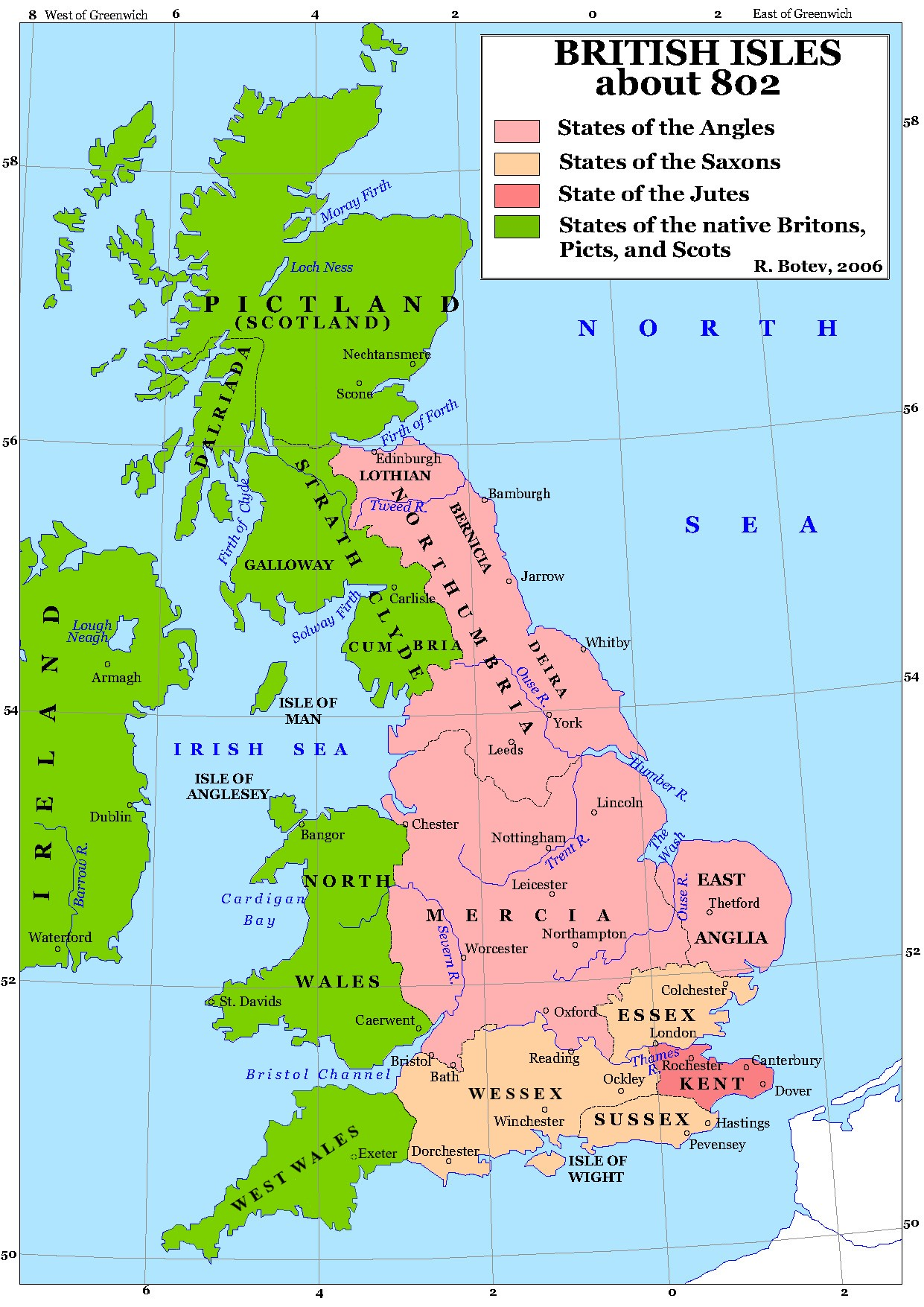
The extent of Northumbria at approximately the time of his reign.

Osbald was a king of Northumbria during 796. He was a friend of Alcuin of York who often sent him letters of advice.

Osbald was a violent man and most likely a murderer as modern records suggest. On 9 January AD 780, he killed Bearn, the son of King Ælfwald by burning him to death at Selectune (possibly Silton, North Yorkshire). In 793 Alcuin wrote two letters to Osbald urging him to give up his extravagant way of life. He criticised his greedy behaviour, luxurious dress and his pagan hair style. He warned him to devote himself to God because "Luxury in emperors means poverty for the people".

Osbald became king of Northumbria in 796 at a time when it was dissolving into anarchy. He ruled for 27 days before being abandoned by the royal household and deserted by the people. He went into exile in Lindisfarne. Here Alcuin wrote Osbald a letter urging him to become a knight. After Osbald's refusal Alcuin sent another letter. It read:

My dear friend Osbald ... I am disappointed in you for not taking my advice. I urged you in my letter that you should give up this way of life. Do not add sin to sin by ruining your country and shedding blood. Think how much blood of emperors, princes, and people has been shed through you and your clan.

Shortly afterwards, Osbald sailed to Pictland with his companions, where he was given refuge by Caustantín, King of the Picts.

Osbald gave his name to two places in and around Northumbria:

- Osbaldeston, Blackburn
- Osbaldwick, York

Osbald died in AD 799 and was buried in an unmarked grave in York Minster.

Preceded by Æthelred I	King of Northumbria; 796	Succeeded by Eardwulf
