= Æthelred I of Northumbria =

King of Northumbria from 774 to 779 and from 790 until his murder in 796

King of Northumbria
- Reign: 774–779
- Predecessor: Alhred of Northumbria
- Successor: Ælfwald I of Northumbria

King of Northumbria (2nd reign)
- Reign: 790 – April 18, 796
- Predecessor: Osred II of Northumbria
- Successor: Osbald of Northumbria
- Born: c. 762
- Died: 18 April 796; Corbridge
- Spouse: Ælfflæd of Mercia
- Father: Æthelwald Moll of Northumbria
- Mother: Æthelthryth

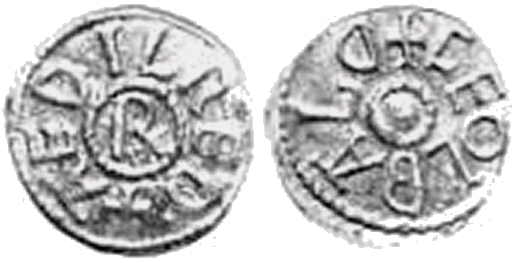
Coin of Æthelred

A mention of Æthelred in the Anglo-Saxon Chronicle

Æthelred (/ˈæθəlrɛd/; c. 762 – 18 April 796), was the king of Northumbria from 774 to 779 and again from 790 until he was murdered in 796. He was the son of Æthelwald Moll and Æthelthryth and possibly became king while still a child after Alhred was deposed.

== Family and early life ==
The origin of Æthelred's family isn't recorded, but his father Æthelwald, who was also called Moll, seems to have come from a noble background. Æthelwald first appears in the historical records in a letter written by Pope Paul I to king Eadberht, ordering him to return lands taken from an Abbot Fothred, which were given to his brother Moll. After the abdication of king Eadberht in 758, his son Oswulf took his place but despite his father's long reign and his powerful uncle Ecgbert, he was murdered just a year later in 759 at Market Weighton by his own bodyguards. The murder was possibly ordered by Æthelwald as he became king soon after. In 761 Oswulf's brother Oswine met Æthelwald in battle but Oswine was killed in the fighting at Eildon Hill on 6 August.

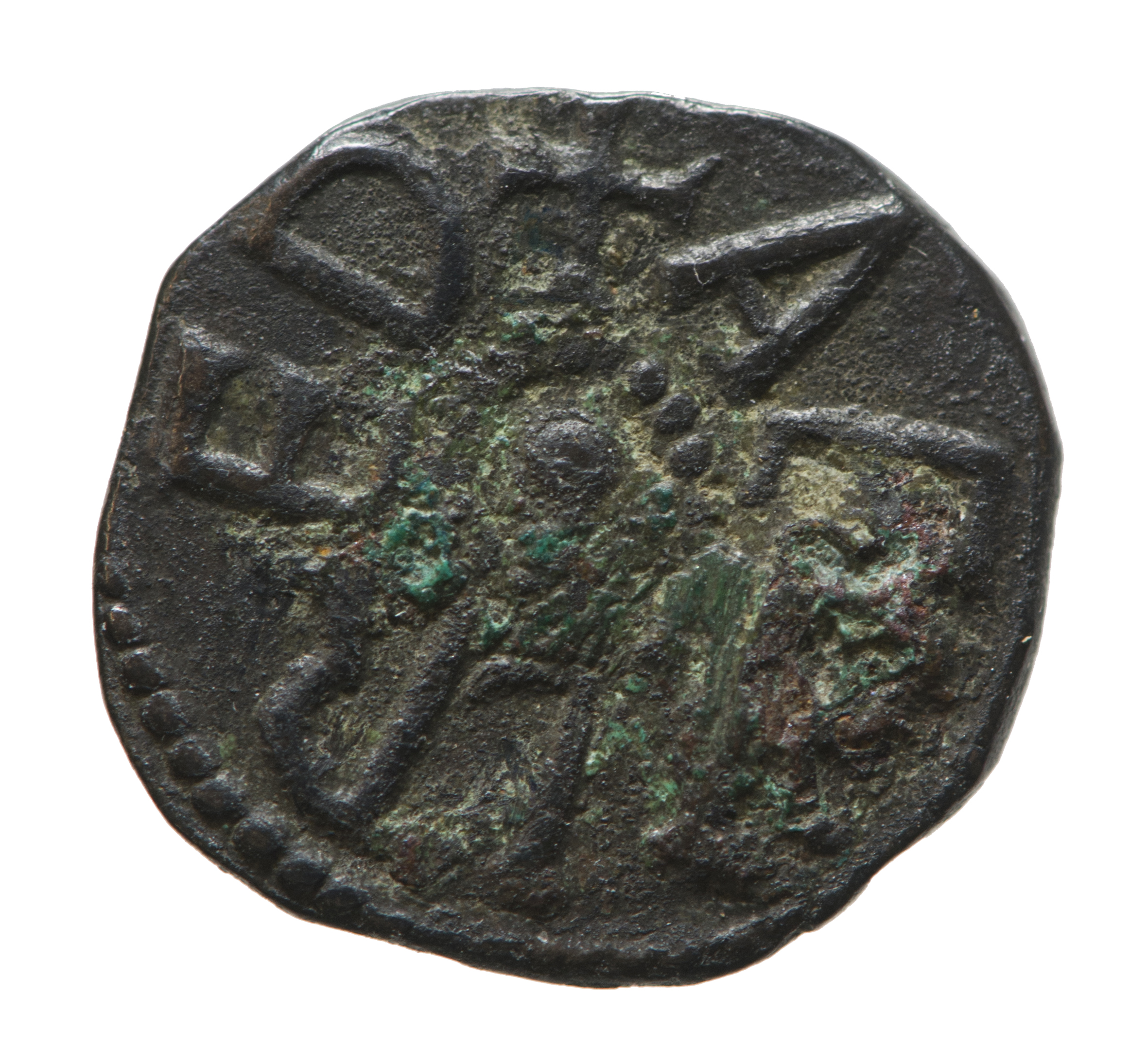
Silver styca of Aethelred

After his victory, Æthelwald married Æthelthryth at Catterick on 1 November 762. Æthelwald was deposed as king on 30 October 765, by a council of noblemen and prelates, and replaced by Alhred, the brother-in-law of Oswulf and Oswine.

== First Term ==
After ruling for nearly ten years, the Northumbrians drove out King Alhred from York in 774. They then chose Æthelred as their king and he was "crowned with such great honour". In the year after his accession Æthelred, who may have been influenced by his father Æthelwald, ordered the killing of an Ealdorman, Eadwulf.

Æthelred was deposed as king and the throne passed on to Ælfwald, a grandson of Eadberht Eating.

== Restoration ==
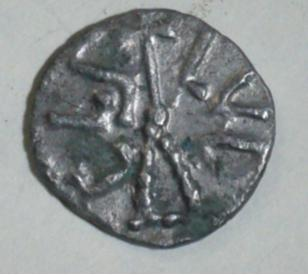
Base silver styca of Aethelred I -- second reign (789-796)

Æthelred lived in exile during the reign of Ælfwald and his successor Osred II. However, in 788 or 789, Osred was deposed, forcibly tonsured and exiled and Æthelred was restored to the throne.

In 790, during Æthelred's second reign, the ealdorman Eardwulf was ordered to be killed by Æthelred but survived and later became king. Ælfwald's sons Ælf and Ælfwine were killed, probably on Æthelred's orders, in 791. The next year Osred attempted to regain the throne, but was defeated, captured and killed on 14 September 792. A year later, Lindisfarne was sacked by the Vikings with Alcuin's letters to Æthelred blaming this event on the sins of Æthelred and his nobility.

On 29 September 792 Æthelred married Ælfflæd the daughter of Offa of Mercia at Catterick.

== Death and succession ==
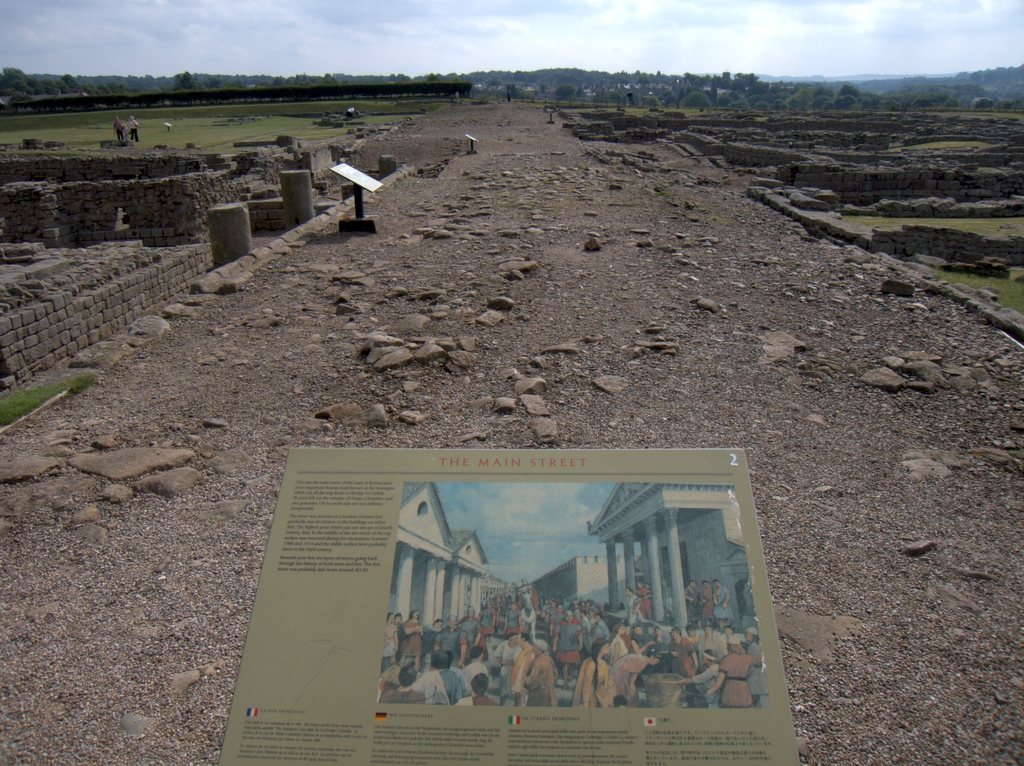
The ancient Roman fortress at Corbridge where Æthelred was slain.

While Æthelred was in Corbridge a group of conspiring nobles murdered him on 18 April 796. As a result, Osbald, an ealdorman and a friend of Alcuin, Æthelred's former adviser, became king, but within 27 days he abdicated.

== See also ==
- List of monarchs of Northumbria

Preceded by Alhred	King of Northumbria; 774–779	Succeeded by Ælfwald I
Preceded by Osred II	King of Northumbria; 790 – April 18, 796	Succeeded by Osbald
