= Alhred of Northumbria =

King of Northumbria from 765 to 774

Alhred
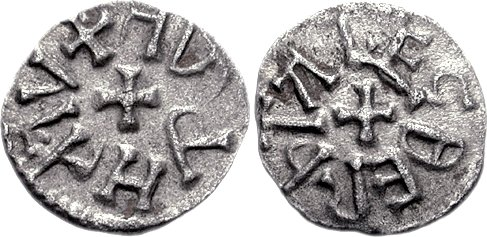
- Sceat of Alhred of Northumbria

King of Northumbria
- Reign: 765–774
- Predecessor: Æthelwald Moll
- Successor: Æthelred
- Spouse: Osgifu
- Issue: Osred II; Alcmund of Derby
- Father: Eadric

Alhred or Alchred was king of Northumbria from 765 to 774. He had married Osgifu, either the daughter of Oswulf, granddaughter of Eadberht Eating, or Eadberht's daughter, and was thus related by marriage to Ecgbert, Archbishop of York. A genealogy survives which makes Alhred a descendant of Ida of Bernicia through a son named Eadric.

== History ==
Æthelwald Moll was deposed in 765 and Alhred became king. Little is said of his reign in the Anglo-Saxon Chronicle other than the bare facts that he became king, and was then deposed and exiled in 774. Symeon of Durham's Historia Regum Anglorum reports that he fled to the kingdom of the Picts, where he was received by King Ciniod.

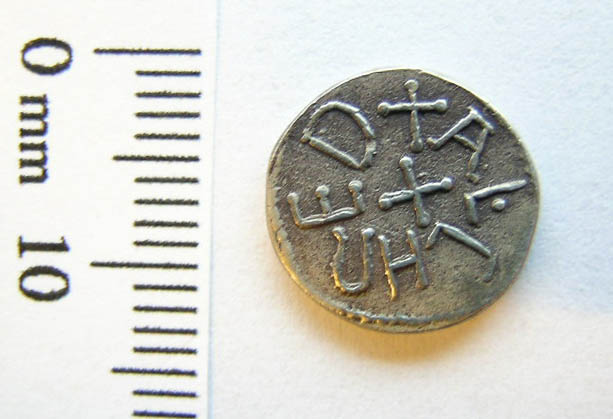
Silver Northumbrian sceatta of Alchred

Frank Stenton notes Ahlred's connection to the English missions on the continent. The mission of Saint Willehad, which led to the founding of the Archbishopric of Bremen, was authorised by a religious assembly called by Alhred. A letter from Alhred to Saint Lull, Archbishop of Mainz, a native of Wessex, also survives.

Alhred was succeeded by Æthelred, son of Æthelwald Moll. Alhred's son Osred would later be king. A second son, Alhmund, would be killed in the reign of Eardwulf and develop a cult as Alcmund of Derby.

== See also ==
- List of monarchs of Northumbria

Preceded by Æthelwald Moll	King of Northumbria	Succeeded by Æthelred
