= Æthelwald Moll of Northumbria =

Æthelwald Moll
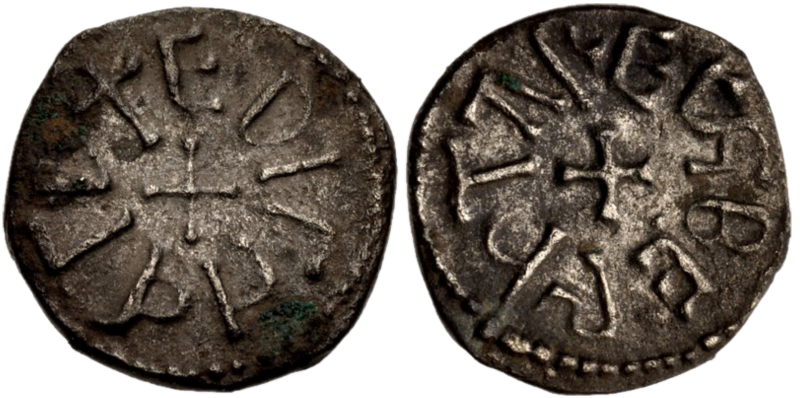
- Silver sceat of Æthelwald Moll, struck 759–765. Coin is a joint issue bearing the names of Æthelwald on the obverse and Archbishop Ecgbert of York on the reverse.

King of Northumbria
- Reign: 5 August 759 – 30 October 765
- Predecessor: Oswulf
- Successor: Alhred
- Spouse: Æthelthryth
- Issue: Æthelred I

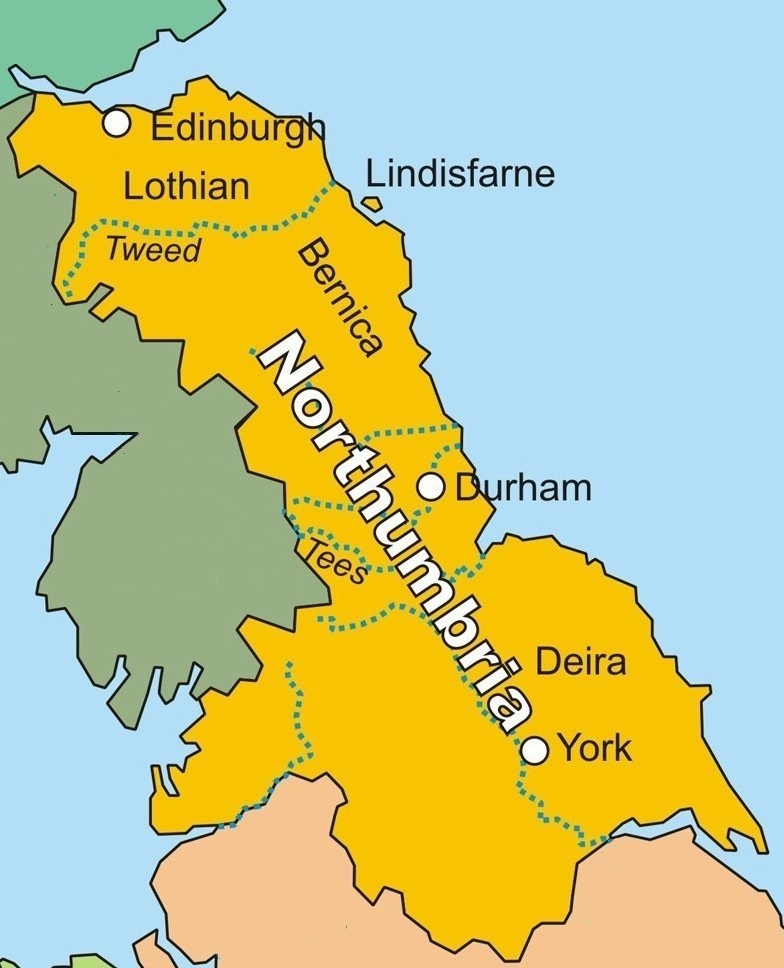
Map showing the major kingdoms of northern Great Britain in the 8th century. Northumbria was formed from the earlier kingdoms of Bernicia and Deira.

Æthelwald Moll was King of Northumbria, the historic petty kingdom of Angles in medieval England, from 759 to 765. He seized power after the murder of Oswulf son of Eadberht; his ancestry and connection to the royal family of Northumbria is unknown. Æthelwald faced at least one rebellion, led by Oswine, perhaps a brother of Oswulf. In 765 a Witenagemot of Northumbrian notables deposed Æthelwald and replaced him with Alhred, a kinsman of his predecessor. After his removal from the throne Æthelwald became a monk, perhaps involuntarily.

Æthelwald's marriage with one Æthelthryth is recorded in 762 at Catterick by Symeon of Durham. He is known to have had at least one son, Æthelred, who later became king.

== Origins ==
Æthelwald is not recorded in the extant genealogies of Northumbrian kings, perhaps because he was not a descendant of Ida and the Bernician kings. Whether he was a descendant of the Deiran dynasty of Ælle, or simply a member of a powerful noble family, is unknown.

It is likely that he is to be identified with the patrician Moll, recorded in the reign of King Eadberht, to whom Eadberht and his brother Ecgbert, Archbishop of York, granted the monasteries of Stonegrave, Coxwold, and Donaemuthe, all in modern Yorkshire. These had belonged to Moll's brother, Abbot Forthred.

== Reign ==
On 24 July 759, King Oswulf was murdered by members of his own household. The regicide was "a crime in which Æthelwald may very well have been involved." Æthelwald was crowned King of Northumbria on 5 August 759.

His reign was not unopposed. The continuator of Bede's Historia ecclesiastica gentis Anglorum reports the death of a certain Oswine in 761. The Anglo-Saxon Chronicle and Symeon of Durham's Historia Regum supply more details, recording that Oswine, "a most noble ætheling", was killed fighting against Æthelwald on 6 August 761 in the Eildon Hills.

Æthelwald was deposed on 30 October 765, apparently by a council of noblemen and prelates held at Pincanheale, an important site used for two later Northumbrian church councils. According to the Irish Annals of Tigernach, Æthelwald was tonsured.

He was succeeded as king by Eadberht's son-in-law Alhred.

== Descendants ==
Æthelwald's marriage with one Æthelthryth is recorded in 762 at Catterick by Symeon of Durham. They are known to have had at least one son, Æthelred, who later became king. It is presumed, on onomastic grounds, that the Moll "slain by the urgent command of King Eardwulf" c. 799 was a kinsman of Æthelwald Moll.

== Notes ==
Preceded by Oswulf	King of Northumbria; 5 August 759–30 October 765	Succeeded by Alhred
