= Ælfwald I of Northumbria =

Northumbrian king from 779 to 788

Ælfwald I

King of Northumbria
- Reign: 779-788
- Predecessor: Æthelwald Moll of Northumbria
- Successor: Osred II
- Born: between 759 and 767
- Died: 788
- Issue: Ælf; Ælfwine
- Father: Oswulf of Northumbria

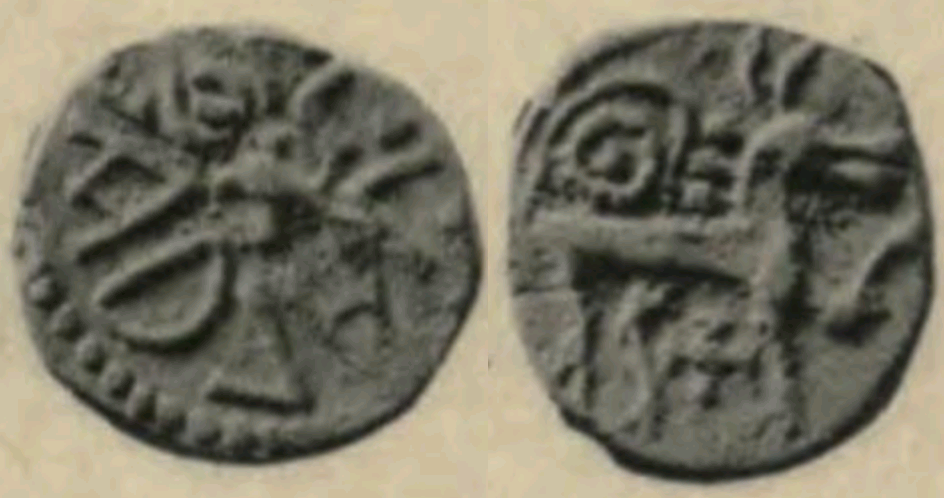
Sceat of Ælfwald I

Ælfwald I (born between 759 and 767 AD) was king of Northumbria from 779 to 788. He is thought to have been a son of Oswulf, and thus a grandson of Eadberht Eating.

Ælfwald became king after Æthelred son of Æthelwald Moll was deposed in 778. He was murdered, probably at Chesters, by ealdorman Sicga. He was buried at Hexham Abbey where he was considered a saint.

Ælfwald was succeeded by his first cousin Osred, son of Alhred and Osgifu, daughter of Eadberht Eating. Ælfwald's sons Ælf and Ælfwine were killed in 791 on the orders of King Æthelred.

== See also ==
- List of monarchs of Northumbria

Preceded by Æthelred	King of Northumbria	Succeeded by Osred
