= Sicga =

Sicga (died 22 February 793) (also given as Siga and Sigha) was a nobleman in the Anglo-Saxon kingdom of Northumbria.

Sicga first appears in the historical record as senior lay witness to the proceedings of a council held by Papal Legate, George, Bishop of Ostia in 786, where he is called a patrician (Sigha patricius), a term which may correspond with the Old English term ealdorman.

The Anglo-Saxon Chronicle records the murder of King Ælfwald by Sigca at Scythlecester (which may be modern Chesters) on 23 September 788:

This year Elwald, king of the Northumbrians, was slain by Siga, on the eleventh day before the calends of October; and a heavenly light was often seen on the spot where he was slain. He was buried in the church of Hexham.

Sicga's death, on 22 February 793, is recorded by the Anglo-Saxon Chronicle, and Symeon of Durham adds that he died by suicide. In spite of this, and the fact that he was a regicide, Sicga was buried at the monastery of Lindisfarne.

== Bibliography ==
- Dümmler, Ernst, et al., Monumenta Germaniae Historica: Epistolae Karolini aevi (II). Reprinted 1995. ISBN 3-921575-70-2 (etext online at Digital MGH)
- Kirby, D.P., The Earliest English Kings. London: Unwin Hyman, 1991. ISBN 0-04-445691-3
- Williams, Ann, Smyth, Alfred P. & Kirby, D.P., A Biographical Dictionary of Dark-Age Britain: England, Scotland and Wales c. 500-c. 1050. London: Seaby, 1991. ISBN 1-85264-047-2
- Yorke, Barbara, The Conversion of Britain: Religion, Politics and Society in Britain c. 600–800. London: Longman, 2006. ISBN 0-582-77292-3
