= Oswulf of Northumbria =

8th-century Northumbrian monarch

Oswulf

King of Northumbria
- Reign: 758–759
- Predecessor: Eadberht of Northumbria
- Successor: Æthelwald Moll of Northumbria
- Died: 24 July 759; Market Weighton
- Issue: Ælfwald I of Northumbria
- Father: Eadberht of Northumbria

Oswulf I was king of Northumbria from 758 to 759. He succeeded his father Eadberht, who had abdicated and joined the monastery at York. Oswulf's uncle was Ecgbert, Archbishop of York.

In spite of his father's long reign, and his powerful uncle, Oswulf did not hold the throne for long. He was murdered within a year of coming to power, by members of his household, by his servants or bodyguards, at Market Weighton, on 24 July 759.

The death of Oswulf's brother, Oswine, is recorded at "Eldunum near Mailros" in August 761, in battle against Æthelwald Moll, who had seized the throne on Oswulf's death.

== See also ==
- List of monarchs of Northumbria

Preceded by Eadberht	King of Northumbria	Succeeded by Æthelwald Moll
