= Eadberht of Northumbria =

Eadberht
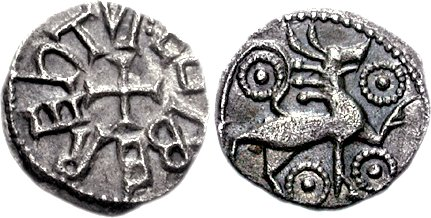
- A sceat of Eadberht

King of Northumbria
- Reign: 737–758
- Predecessor: Ceolwulf
- Successor: Oswulf
- Died: 19 or 20 August 768; York, England
- Burial: York Minster
- Issue: Oswulf, King of Northubria; Oswine; Osgifu
- House: Idings
- Father: Eata
- Religion: Christianity

Eadberht (died 19 or 20 August 768) was king of Northumbria from 737 or 738 to 758. He was the brother of Ecgbert, Archbishop of York. His reign is seen as a return to the imperial ambitions of seventh-century Northumbria and may represent a period of economic prosperity. He faced internal opposition from rival dynasties and at least two actual or potential rivals were killed during his reign. In 758 he abdicated in favour of his son Oswulf and became a monk at York.

== Origins ==
Eadberht became ruler of Northumbria following the second abdication of his cousin Ceolwulf, who entered the monastery at Lindisfarne. Unlike Ceolwulf's first abdication, which clearly involved force, his second, in favour of Eadberht, may have been voluntary.

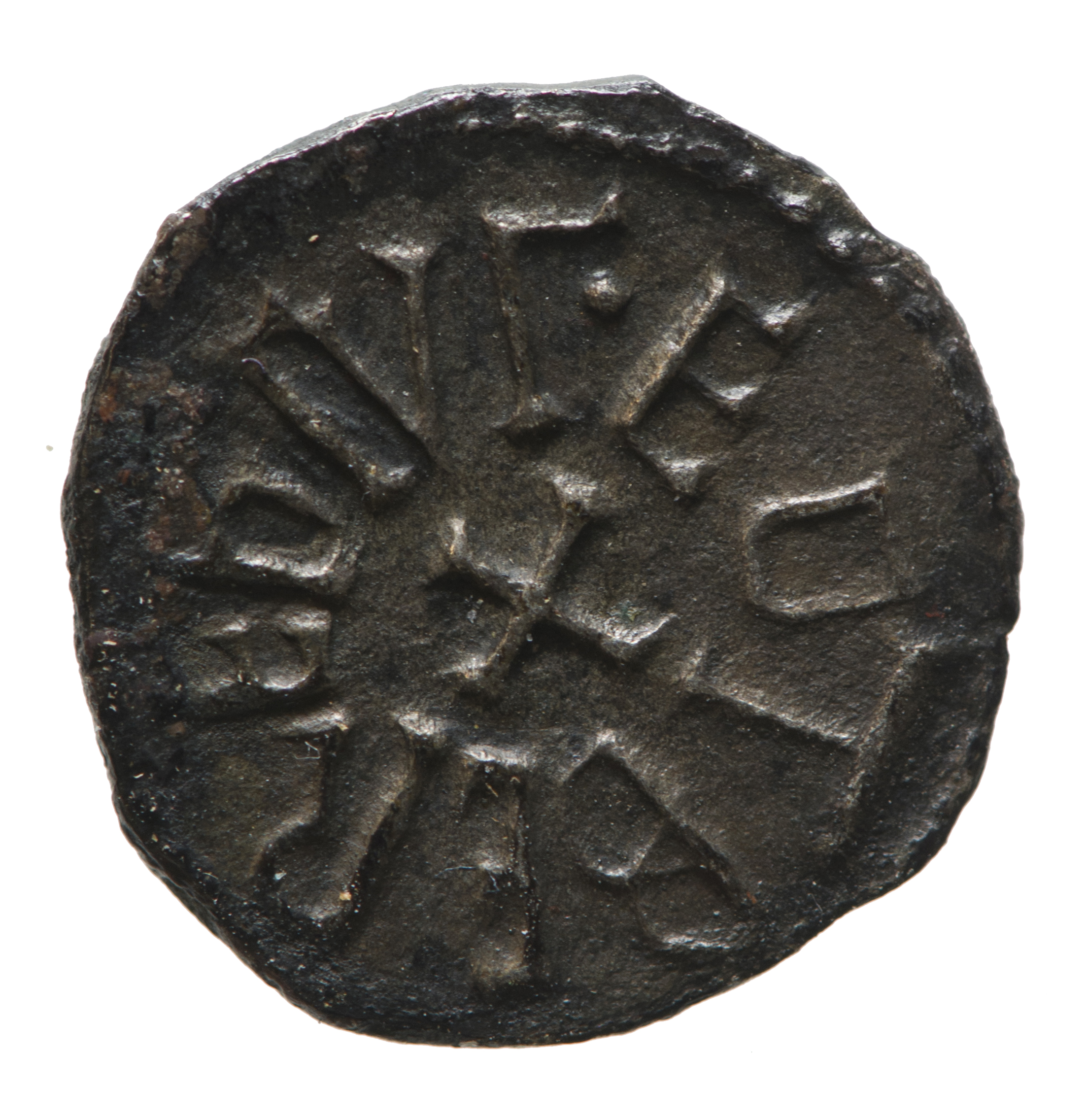
Silver sceatta of Eadberht

Eadberht son of Eata was a descendant of Ida of Bernicia through either his son Ocga (Anglo-Saxon Chronicle and Anglian collection) or Eadric (Historia Brittonum). The genealogy gives Eadberht's father Eata the cognomen Glin Mawr.

== Northumbria ==
Eadberht appears to have faced opposition from rival families throughout his reign. Eardwine, probably the son of King Eadwulf, and grandfather of the future king Eardwulf, was killed in 740. In 750 Offa, son of King Aldfrith was taken from the sanctuary of Lindisfarne and put to death after a siege, while Bishop Cynewulf of Lindisfarne, who had presumably supported Offa, was deposed and detained in York. The importance of religious foundations in Northumbrian political struggles and family feuds is apparent. Eardwine's family is associated with Ripon, Offa and Ceolwulf with Lindisfarne, and Hexham appears to have supported kings and noblemen opposed by the Lindisfarne community. Eadberht, however, as brother of the Archbishop of York, enjoyed the support of the greatest Northumbrian prelate.

Eadberht's reign saw major reforms to the Northumbrian coinage, and some coins name King Eadberht and Archbishop Ecgberht. Kirby concludes that "the indications are that Eadberht was bringing new prosperity to his kingdom." A letter sent by Pope Paul I to Eadberht and Ecgberht, ordering them to return lands taken from Abbot Fothred, and given to his brother Moll, presumed to be the same person as the later king Æthelwald Moll, suggests that Eadberht's reign saw attempts at reclaiming some of the vast lands which had been granted to the church in earlier reigns.

== Neighbours ==
Kirby suggests that "a revival of seventh-century northern imperial ambitions had evidently occurred among the Northumbrians at the court of Eadberht".

The first record of Eadberht's efforts to recreate this dominion appear in 740, the year of Earnwine's death. A war between the Picts and the Northumbrians is reported, during which Æthelbald, King of Mercia, took advantage of the absence of Eadberht to ravage his lands. The reason for the war is unclear, but Woolf suggests that it was related to the killing of Earnwine. Earnwine's father had been an exile in the north after his defeat in the civil war of 705–706, and it may be that the Pictish king Óengus, or Æthelbald, or both, had tried to place him on the Northumbrian throne.

In 750, Eadberht conquered the plain of Kyle and in 756, he campaigned alongside King Óengus against the Britons of Alt Clut. The campaign is reported as follows:

In the year of the Lord's incarnation 756, king Eadberht in the eighteenth year of his reign, and Unust, king of Picts led armies to the town of Dumbarton. And hence the Britons accepted terms there, on the first day of the month of August. But on the tenth day of the same month perished almost the whole army which he led from Ouania to Niwanbirig.

That Ouania is Govan is now reasonably certain, but the location of Newanbirig is less so. Although there are many Newburghs, it is Newburgh-on-Tyne near Hexham that has been the preferred location. An alternative interpretation of the events of 756 has been advanced: it identifies Newanbirig with Newborough by Lichfield in the kingdom of Mercia. A defeat here for Eadberht and Óengus by Æthelbald's Mercians would correspond with the claim in the Saint Andrews foundation legends that a king named Óengus son of Fergus founded the church there as a thanksgiving to Saint Andrew for saving him after a defeat in Mercia.

== Abdication ==
Eadberht abdicated in 758, entering the monastery attached to the cathedral of York. His death there in 768 is recorded in Symeon of Durham's chronicle. Symeon's History of the Church of Durham records that Eadberht was buried in the porch of the cathedral, alongside his brother Ecgberht, who had died in 766.

His son Oswulf succeeded him, but was murdered within the year. However, his daughter Osgifu's husband Alhred became king, and Eadberht's descendants, such as Oswulf's son Ælfwald and Osgifu's son Osred contested for the Northumbrian throne until the end of the century. Eadberht's last known descendant is Osgifu's son Saint Alhmund, murdered in 800 on the orders of King Eardwulf, and reputed a martyr.

== Notes ==
Preceded by Ceolwulf	King of Northumbria; 737 or 738–758	Succeeded by Oswulf
