= Ecgbert of York =

Archbishop of York from 735 to 766

Ecgbert
- Archbishop of York
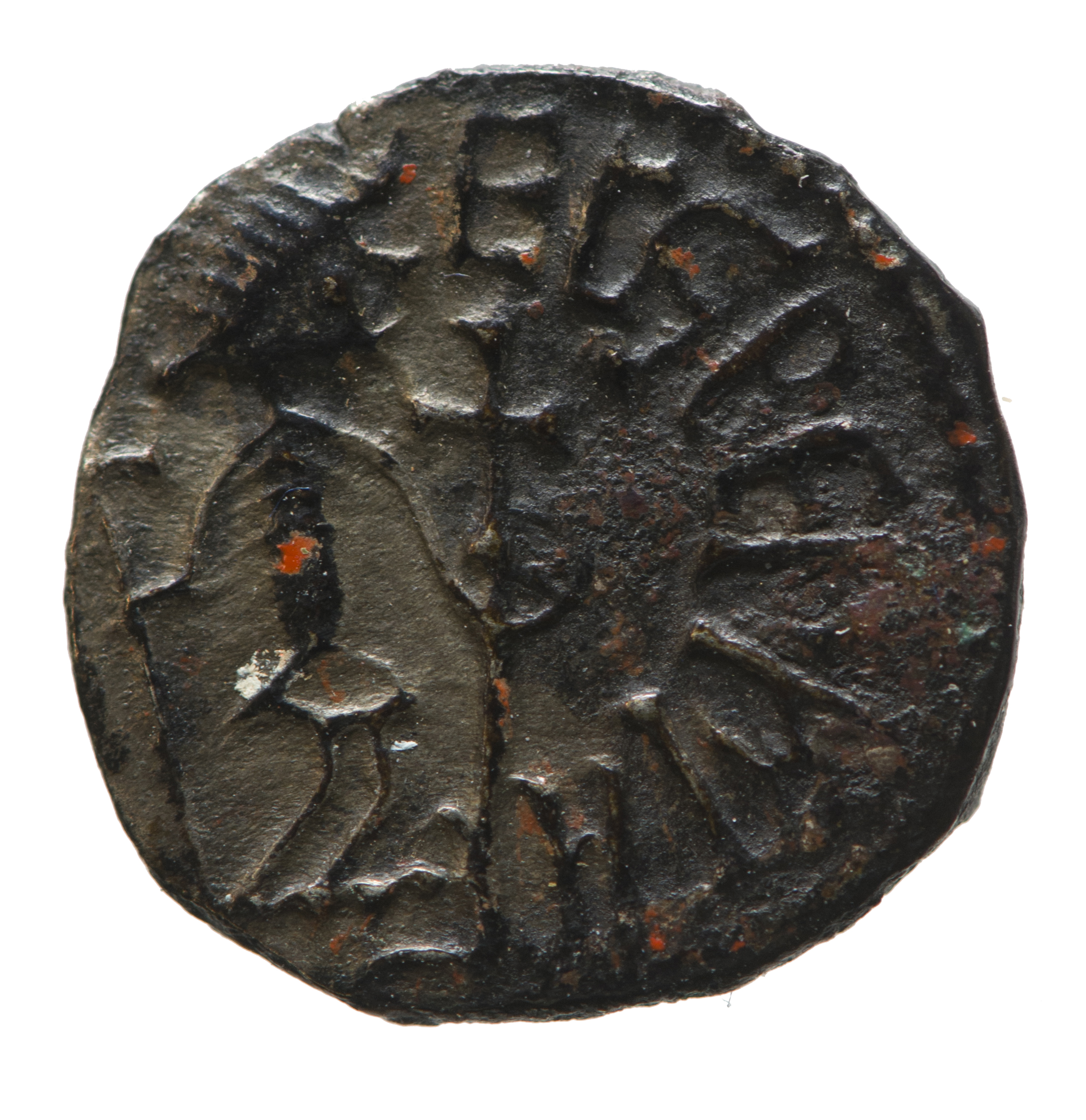
- Coin of Archbishop Ecgbert
- Appointed: 732
- Term ended: 19 November 766
- Predecessor: Wilfrid II
- Successor: Æthelbert

Personal details
- Died: 19 November 766
- Buried: York Minster
- Parents: Eata

Ecgbert (Note: Also spelled Egbert, Egberht or Ecgberht.) (died 19 November 766) was an 8th-century cleric who established the archdiocese of York in 735. In 737, Ecgbert's brother became king of Northumbria and the two siblings worked together on ecclesiastical issues. Ecgbert was a correspondent of Bede and Boniface and the author of a legal code for his clergy. Other works have been ascribed to him, although the attribution is doubted by modern scholars.

== Early life and career ==
Ecgbert was the son of Eata, who was descended from the founder of the kingdom of Bernicia. His brother Eadberht was king of Northumbria from 737 to 758. Ecgbert went to Rome with another brother, and was ordained deacon while still there. Ecgbert has been claimed to have been a student of Bede, who much later visited Ecgbert in 733 at York, but this statement may simply mean that Ecgbert was a student of Bede's writings, and not that he was formally taught by him.

== Archbishop ==
Ecgbert was named to the see of York around 732 (other sources date the appointment to 734) by his cousin Ceolwulf, the king of Northumbria. Pope Gregory III gave him a pallium, the symbol of an archbishop's authority, in 735. After Eadberht became king, the brothers worked together, and were forbidden by the papacy to transfer church lands to secular control. (Note: The pope who forbade the brothers was Pope Paul I.) They also worked together to deal with problems that had developed in the relationship between the church and royal government. An example of the brothers' co-operation is the fact that some of Eadberht's coins feature Ecbert's image on the opposite face.

Ecgbert's problems with the monasteries in his diocese came from the secular practice of families setting up monasteries that were totally under their control as a way of making the family lands book-land and free from secular service. Book-land was at first an exclusive right of ecclesiastical property. By transferring land to a family-controlled monastery, the family would retain the use of the land without having to perform any services to the king for the land.

== Educational activities ==
The school Ecgbert founded at York is held by the modern historian Peter Hunter Blair to have equalled or surpassed the famous monasteries at Wearmouth and Jarrow. The school educated not just the cathedral clergy but also the offspring of nobles. Blair also calls the library that was established at York "a library whose contents were unequalled in the western Europe of its day". Among the students at the school was Alcuin, who was placed by his family with Ecgbert. Both Liudger, later the first Bishop of Münster, and Aluberht, another bishop in Germany, also studied at the school in York.

== Correspondents ==
Bede wrote Ecgbert a letter dealing with monastic issues as well as the problems of large dioceses. The letter, written in 734, became known as the Epistola ad Ecgberhtum episcopum. Bede urged Ecgbert to study Gregory the Great's Pastoral Care, and held up Aidan and Cuthbert as examples of model bishops. The main thrust of Bede's letter was to urge Ecgbert to reform his church to more closely resemble Gregory the Great's original plan for it. Bede's admonition to divide up dioceses fell on deaf ears, as Egbert did not break up his large diocese. The suffragans continued to be limited to the bishops of Hexham, Lindisfarne, and Whithorn.

Boniface wrote to Ecgbert, asking for support against Æthelbald of Mercia. Boniface also asked the archbishop for some of Bede's books, and in return sent wine to be drunk "in a merry day with the brethren." On another occasion, Boniface sent the archbishop a cloak and towel.

== Writings ==
Ecgbert wrote the Dialogus ecclesiasticae institutionis, (Note: Sometimes the title is given as Succinctus dialogus ecclesiasticae institutionis or an even longer title of Succinctus dialogus ecclesiasticae institutionis a Domino Egbherto, Archiepiscopo Eburacae civitatis conpositus.) which was a legal code for the clergy, setting forth the proper procedures for many clerical and ecclesiastical issues including weregild for clerics, entrance to clerical orders, deposition from the clergy, criminal monks, clerics in court, and other matters. It survives as one complete manuscript, with a few excerpts in other manuscripts. (Note: The manuscript is part of the Cotton Library and is catalogued as Vitellius A xii, and is folios 4v through 8r in that manuscript.) Because Ecgbert was the senior archbishop in England after the death of Nothhelm in 739, it is possible that the Dialogus was intended not just for the Northumbrian church but for the entire church in England. The Dialogus details a code of conduct for the clergy and how the clergy was to behave in society. The exact date it was composed is unclear, but it was probably after 735, based on the mention of the archiepiscopal status of Ecgbert in one title as well as the internal evidence of the work. The historian Simon Coates saw the Dialogus as not especially exalting monks above the laity.

Other works were attributed to Egbert in the Middle Ages, but they are not regarded by modern scholars as authentic. These include a collection of church canons, as well as a penitential and a pontifical. The penitential, known as the Paenitentiale Ecgberhti, was ascribed to Ecgbert by the 8th or 9th centuries, but its surviving versions have little or no content that can be reliably traced to Ecgbert. The pontifical, known as the Pontificale Egberti, is thought to owe its attribution to Ecgbert's authorship to the fact that the penitential ascribed to Ecgbert was included within its contents. Lastly, the collection of church laws known previously as the Excerptiones Ecgberhti but today as the Collectio canonum Wigorniensis, has been shown to be the work of a later archbishop of York, Wulfstan, and was not connected with Ecgbert until after the Anglo-Saxon period. Besides these Latin works, an Old English text, known variously as the Scriftboc, Confessionale Pseudo-Egberti or Confessionale Egberti, was once stated to be a translation from Latin by Ecgbert, but is now known to date from the late 9th or 10th century. (Note: Some of the works previously ascribed to Ecgbert are now ascribed to an 11th-century author, Hucarius.)

== Death and legacy ==
Ecgbert died on 19 November 766, and was buried in his cathedral at York. Ecgbert had a reputation after his death as an expert on canon law and church legislation, both in his native England and on the mainland of Europe. Alcuin also claimed that he was known as a teacher of singing. The historian D. P. Kirby described him as a "great" archbishop. The historian Henry Mayr-Harting stated that Ecgbert "must be regarded as one of the great architects of the English church in the eighth century".

== Citations ==
Christian titles
Preceded by Wilfrid II	Bishop of York; 732–735	Office upgraded to archbishopric
New title Office upgraded from bishopric	Archbishop of York; 735–766	Succeeded by Æthelbert
