= 806 =

Calendar year

806 in various calendars
Gregorian calendar	806; DCCCVI
Ab urbe condita	1559
Armenian calendar	255; ԹՎ ՄԾԵ
Assyrian calendar	5556
Balinese saka calendar	727–728
Bengali calendar	212–213
Berber calendar	1756
Buddhist calendar	1350
Burmese calendar	168
Byzantine calendar	6314–6315
Chinese calendar	乙酉年 (Wood Rooster); 3503 or 3296 — to — 丙戌年 (Fire Dog); 3504 or 3297
Coptic calendar	522–523
Discordian calendar	1972
Ethiopian calendar	798–799
Hebrew calendar	4566–4567
- Hindu calendars
Vikram Samvat	862–863
Shaka Samvat	727–728
Kali Yuga	3906–3907
Holocene calendar	10806
Iranian calendar	184–185
Islamic calendar	190–191
Japanese calendar	Enryaku 25 / Daidō 1 (大同元年)
Javanese calendar	701–703
Julian calendar	806; DCCCVI
Korean calendar	3139
Minguo calendar	1106 before ROC 民前1106年
Nanakshahi calendar	−662
Seleucid era	1117/1118 AG
Thai solar calendar	1348–1349
Tibetan calendar	阴木鸡年 (female Wood-Rooster); 932 or 551 or −221 — to — 阳火狗年 (male Fire-Dog); 933 or 552 or −220

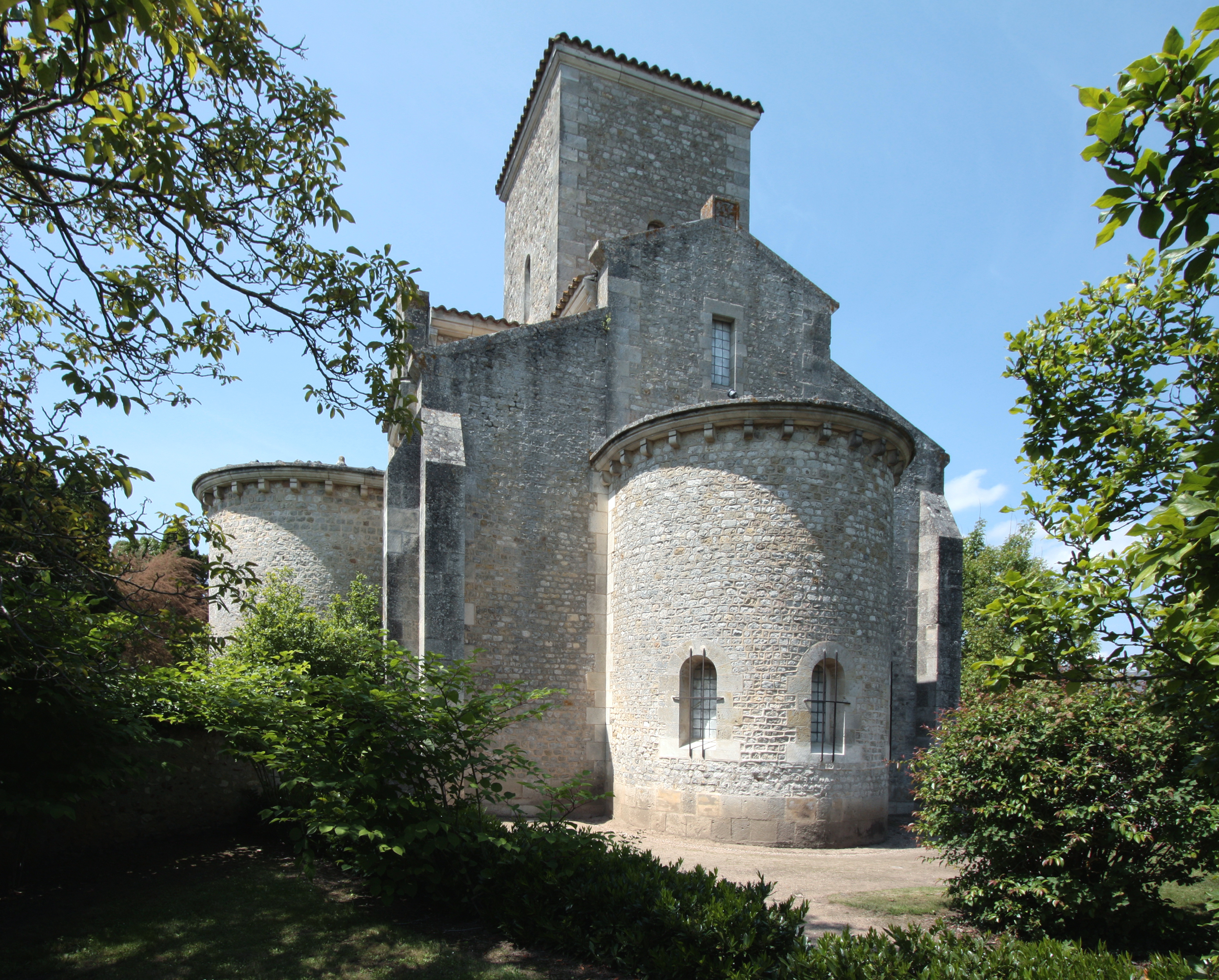
The church (oratory) in Germigny-des-Prés

Year 806 (DCCCVI) was a common year starting on Thursday of the Julian calendar, the 806th year of the Common Era (CE) and Anno Domini (AD) designations, the 806th year of the 1st millennium, the 6th year of the 9th century, and the 7th year of the 800s decade.

== Events ==
=== By place ===
==== Asia ====
- February 5 – Emperor Kanmu dies after a 25-year reign, that has seen Korean culture and technology introduced to Japan. He is succeeded by his son Heizei, as the 51st emperor of Japan.
- Hōzen-ji Temple is founded in Wakakusa, Nakakoma District, Japan (now Minami-Alps, Yamanashi Prefecture). The temple follows the Shingon sect of Japanese Buddhism.

==== Abbasid Caliphate ====
- Arab–Byzantine wars: Caliph Harun al-Rashid leads a huge military expedition, assembling men from Syria, Palestine, Persia, and Egypt. The invasion army (reportedly 135,000 men) departs from Raqqa, residence of Harun, and enters Cappadocia through the Cilician Gates, sacking several Byzantine fortresses and cities. Heraclea is captured after a month-long siege (August/September). The city is plundered and razed; its inhabitants are enslaved and deported to the Abbasid Caliphate.

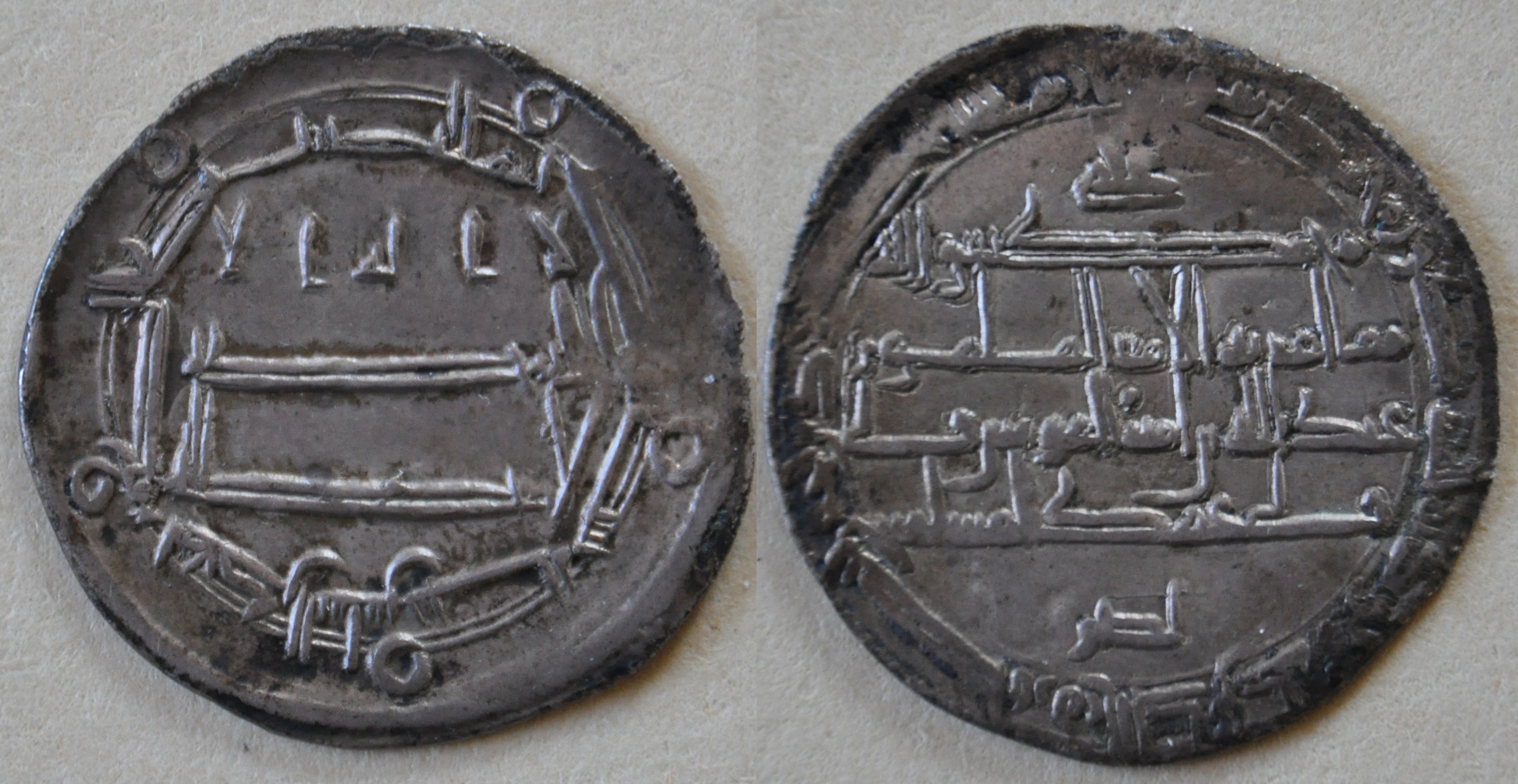
Dirham of Abbasid caliph Harun al-Rashid minted in Tashkent (Mad'an al-Shash) in 190 AH (805/806 CE)

- Arab–Byzantine wars: An Abbasid fleet under Humayd ibn Ma'yuf al-Hajuri raids Cyprus, carrying off 16,000 inhabitants as slaves.
- Harun al-Rashid appoints Ashot Msaker ("the Carnivorous") as the new presiding prince of Armenia. The Bagratids emerge as one of the country's two most powerful noble families. Harun recognizes another Bagratid branch, under Ashot I Curopalates, as princes of Caucasian Iberia.
- Rafi ibn al-Layth, an Arab nobleman, leads a large-scale rebellion against oppressive taxation by the Abbasid governor Ali ibn Isa ibn Mahan. He launches a revolt in Samarkand, which spreads quickly across Khorasan.

==== Britain ====
- Vikings massacre Columba's monks, and all the inhabitants on the island of Iona (Scotland). Other monks flee to safety in the monastery of Kells (Ireland). They take with them the Book of Kells.
- King Eardwulf of Northumbria is expelled from his kingdom by his rival Ælfwald II, who takes the throne. Eardwulf flees to the Frankish court of Charlemagne, and later visits Pope Leo III in Rome.

==== Europe ====
- November – Al-Hakam I, Umayyad emir of Córdoba, reasserts his control over the city of Toledo, autonomous since 797. To this effect Al-Hakam has over 72 nobles (accounts talk of 5,000) massacred at a banquet, crucified and displayed along the banks of the Guadalquivir River (modern Spain), in what comes to be known as the "Day of the Trench".
- Emperor Charlemagne divides the Frankish Empire under his three sons, called Divisio Regnorum. For Charles the Younger he designates the imperial title, Austrasia and Neustria, Saxony, Burgundy, and Thuringia. To Pepin he gives Italy, Bavaria, and Swabia. His youngest son Louis the Pious receives Aquitaine, the Spanish March, and Provence.
- Grimoald III, Lombard duke of Benevento, dies without heirs. He is succeeded by Grimoald IV, who is forced to pay tribute to King Charles the Younger.

=== By topic ===
==== Religion ====
- April 12 – Nikephoros I is elected patriarch of Constantinople, succeeding Tarasios.
- The church (oratory) in Germigny-des-Prés is built by Bishop Theodulf of Orléans.
- July 26 – Wulfred is elected Archbishop of Canterbury.

== Births ==
- Hincmar, archbishop of Reims (d. 882)
- Leuthard II, Frankish count (approximate date)
- Ralpacan, king of Tibet (approximate date)

== Deaths ==
- February 5 – Kanmu, emperor of Japan (b. 737)
- February 11 – Shun Zong, emperor of the Tang Dynasty (b. 761)
- February 25 – Tarasios, patriarch of Constantinople
- July 19 – Li Shigu, general of the Tang Dynasty (b. 778)
- Grimoald III, Lombard prince of Benevento
- Miliduch, prince (knyaz) of the Sorbs (approximate date)
- Muhammad ibn Ibrahim al-Fazari, Muslim philosopher (or 796)
- Yahya ibn Khalid, Persian vizier of Bagdad
