= List of cultural properties of Japan – paintings (Yamanashi) =

This list is of the cultural properties of Japan designated in the category of paintings (絵画, kaiga) for the Prefecture of Yamanashi.

== National Cultural Properties ==
As of 1 September 2015, twelve Important Cultural Properties (including two *National Treasures) have been designated, being of national significance.

Property	Date	Municipality	Ownership	Comments	Image	Dimensions	Coordinates	Ref.
*Summer Landscape, colour on silk 絹本著色夏景山水図 kenpon chakushoku kakei sansui zu	Southern Song	Minobu	Kuon-ji			118.5 centimetres (46.7 in) by 52.7 centimetres (20.7 in)	35°22′55″N 138°25′30″E	
*Daruma, colour on silk 絹本著色達磨図 kenpon chakushoku Daruma zu	Kamakura period	Kōshū	Kōgaku-ji			123.3 centimetres (48.5 in) by 61.2 centimetres (24.1 in)	35°42′39″N 138°43′22″E	
Sankō Kokushi, colour on silk 絹本著色三光国師像 kenpon chakushoku Sankō Kokushi zō	1386	Kōshū	Kōgaku-ji				35°42′39″N 138°43′22″E	
Shaka Triad with Eighteen Arhats, colour on silk 絹本著色釈迦三尊十八羅漢図 kenpon chakushoku Shaka sanzon jūhachi rakan zu	Kamakura period	Kōfu	Ichiren-ji (一蓮寺)	three scrolls			35°39′07″N 138°34′17″E	
Eight Phases of Shaka, colour on silk 絹本著色釈迦八相図 kenpon chakushoku Shaka hassō zu	Kamakura period	Minobu	Kuon-ji	three scrolls			35°22′55″N 138°25′30″E	
Daien Zenji, colour on silk 絹本著色大円禅師像 kenpon chakushoku Daien Zenji zō	1393	Kōshū	Kōgaku-ji				35°42′39″N 138°43′22″E	
Takeda Nobutora, colour on silk, by Takeda Nobukado 絹本著色武田信虎像〈武田信廉筆／〉 kenpon chakushoku Takeda Nobutora zō (Takeda Nobukado hitsu)	Muromachi period	Kōfu	Daisen-ji (大泉寺)				35°40′37″N 138°34′51″E	
Wife of Takeda Nobutora, colour on silk, by Takeda Nobukado 絹本著色武田信虎夫人像〈武田信廉筆／〉 kenpon chakushoku Takeda Nobutora fujin zō (Takeda Nobukado hitsu)	Muromachi period	Kōfu	Chōzen-ji (長禅寺)				35°39′56″N 138°34′38″E	
Nirvana painting, colour on silk, attributed to Reisai 絹本著色仏涅槃図〈（伝霊彩筆）／〉 kenpon chakushoku Butsu nehan zu (den-Reisai hitsu)	Muromachi period	Fuefuki	Daizōkyō-ji (大蔵経寺)				35°39′38″N 138°38′00″E	
Pictorial Biography of Hōnen Shōnin, colour on silk 絹本著色法然上人絵伝 kenpon chakushoku Hōnen shōnin e-den	Kamakura period	Fuefuki	Yamanashi Prefectural Museum	pair of scrolls			35°38′25″N 138°38′54″E	
Pine and Plum, ink on silk, by Gotaiso 絹本墨画松梅図〈呉太素筆／〉 kenpon bokuga shōbai zu	Yuan dynasty	Kōfu	Daisen-ji (大泉寺)				35°40′37″N 138°34′51″E	
Tao Hongjing Listening to the Pines, light colour on paper 紙本淡彩陶道明聴松図 shihon tansai Tō Dōmyō chōshō zu	1442	Fuefuki	Yamanashi Prefectural Museum				35°38′25″N 138°38′54″E	

== Prefectural Cultural Properties ==
As of 1 May 2015, forty-seven properties have been designated at a prefectural level.

Property	Date	Municipality	Ownership	Comments	Image	Dimensions	Coordinates	Ref.
Hachiman in Priestly Attire, painting on wooden boards 板絵僧形八幡神像 ita-e sōgyō Hachiman shinzō	1461	Minami-Alps	Hōzen-ji				35°36′11″N 138°29′05″E	
Tenjin Crossing to China, colour on paper 紙本著色渡唐天神像図 shihon chakushoku Totō Tenjin zōzu		Kōshū	Kumano Jinja (熊野神社)				35°41′30″N 138°43′31″E	

== See also ==
- Cultural Properties of Japan
- List of National Treasures of Japan (paintings)
- Japanese painting
- List of Historic Sites of Japan (Yamanashi)
