= AD 808 =

Calendar year

808 in various calendars
Gregorian calendar	808; DCCCVIII
Ab urbe condita	1561
Armenian calendar	257; ԹՎ ՄԾԷ
Assyrian calendar	5558
Balinese saka calendar	729–730
Bengali calendar	214–215
Berber calendar	1758
Buddhist calendar	1352
Burmese calendar	170
Byzantine calendar	6316–6317
Chinese calendar	丁亥年 (Fire Pig); 3505 or 3298 — to — 戊子年 (Earth Rat); 3506 or 3299
Coptic calendar	524–525
Discordian calendar	1974
Ethiopian calendar	800–801
Hebrew calendar	4568–4569
- Hindu calendars
Vikram Samvat	864–865
Shaka Samvat	729–730
Kali Yuga	3908–3909
Holocene calendar	10808
Iranian calendar	186–187
Islamic calendar	192–193
Japanese calendar	Daidō 3 (大同３年)
Javanese calendar	704–705
Julian calendar	808; DCCCVIII
Korean calendar	3141
Minguo calendar	1104 before ROC 民前1104年
Nanakshahi calendar	−660
Seleucid era	1119/1120 AG
Thai solar calendar	1350–1351
Tibetan calendar	མེ་མོ་ཕག་ལོ་ (female Fire-Boar); 934 or 553 or −219 — to — ས་ཕོ་བྱི་བ་ལོ་ (male Earth-Rat); 935 or 554 or −218

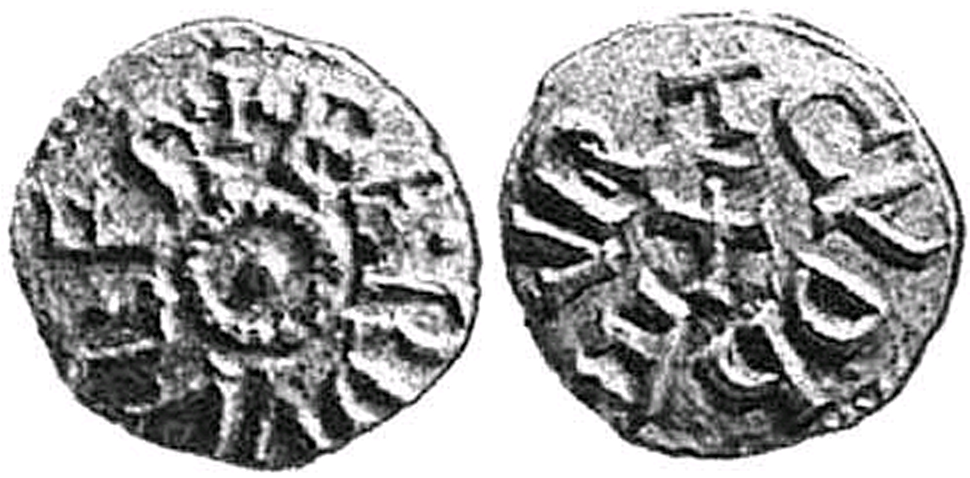
Coin of king Eardwulf of Northumbria

Year 808 (DCCCVIII) was a leap year starting on Saturday of the Julian calendar, the 808th year of the Common Era (CE) and Anno Domini (AD) designations, the 808th year of the 1st millennium, the 8th year of the 9th century, and the 9th year of the 800s decade.

== Events ==
=== By place ===
==== Europe ====
- King Godfred of the Danes forms an alliance with the Wiltzi and other Wendic tribes, against the pagan but pro-Frankish Abodrites. Godfred builds earthworks (Danevirke) across the isthmus of Schleswig-Holstein, separating Jutland from the northern extent of the Frankish Empire.
- Viking Age: First Viking raid, by Danes against the Baltic coast. Godfred destroys the Slav settlement of Reric (near present-day Wismar), used as a strategic trade route. The population is displaced or abducted, to Hedeby (Denmark).
- Emperor Charlemagne gives orders to construct two new forts on the Elbe River, garrisoning them against future Slav incursions.
- In Gharb al-Andalus (modern Portugal), Hazim ibn Wahb leads a rebellion against the Emirate of Córdoba.

==== Britain ====
- Exiled king Eardwulf of Northumbria is able to return to his kingdom, with the support of Charlemagne and Pope Leo III. He ousts the usurper, King Ælfwald II.
- Cadell ap Brochfael, king of Powys (modern Wales), dies after a 35-year reign, and is succeeded by his son Cyngen ap Cadell.

=== By topic ===
==== Finance ====
- Jewish merchants in Lombardy open the first bank (or money repository) in Italy (approximate date).

== Births ==
- September 27 – Ninmyō, emperor of Japan (d. 850)
- Emma of Altdorf, Frankish queen (or 803)
- Gottschalk of Orbais, German monk and theologian (approximate date)
- Kang Chengxun, general of the Tang Dynasty (approximate date)
- Kim Yang, viceroy of Silla (Korea) (d. 857)
- Walafrid Strabo, Frankish theological writer (approximate date)

== Deaths ==
- Ælfwald II, king of Northumbria (approximate date)
- Al-Fadl ibn Yahya al-Barmaki, Muslim governor (b. 766)
- Cadell ap Brochfael, king of Powys (Wales)
- Du Huangchang, chancellor of the Tang Dynasty
- Eanbald II, archbishop of York
- Elipando, Spanish archbishop and theologian (approximate date)
- Layman Pang, Chinese (Zen) Buddhist (b. 740)
