= Holy Hill =

Holy Hill may refer to:

in England

- Holy Hill, a monastery in England

in Ireland

- The Holy Hill Hermitage in Ireland

in the United States

- Holy Hill National Shrine of Mary, Help of Christians, Erin, Wisconsin, also known as Holy Hill and listed as that on the National Register of Historic Places
- Holy Hill, a hill in Berkeley, California which is the site of a number of seminaries and the library of the Graduate Theological Union
