= Minami-Alps Biosphere Reserve =

Coordinates: 35.645°N 138.218°E

The Minami-Alps Biosphere Reserve is one of Japan's few high-rainfall areas, with a maximum elevation above sea level of 3,193 m (10,476 ft) (lowest 180 m (590 ft)). Most of the site is made up of forest, with an area characterized by alpine plant communities (flower fields) and dense forest vegetation. The reserve is home to many local festivals, with discoveries of relics from the Jōmon Period, and folk arts traditions. Historically, inhabitants lived in regions with close connections to the mountains and thus engaged in hunting, fishing, gathering vegetables, and agriculture.

== Ecological characteristics ==
The Minami-Alps Biosphere Reserve is flanked on two sides by rivers and lies within the Palearctic realm which includes the Eurasian continent and the African continent north of the Sahara Desert. The main habitats in the area consist of the alpine vegetation region (with numerous endemic species like Callianthemum hondoense), the subalpine coniferous forest region, the deciduous broad-leaved forest region, and the evergreen broad-leaved forest region. The land cover types include planted forests, agricultural land, and residential areas.

Through its many forests, and with the exception of planted forests, the vegetation of the Minami-Alps is formed from natural and secondary vegetation. It contains both limited primeval natural environment, and regenerated natural forests that were logged in the past. Planted forest environments are mostly disseminated around human habitation and provide wood products (typically conifers) with high market values that are widely distributed in the transition areas. The hills from the subalpine zone contain planted forests of larch, Japanese cedar, Japanese cypress, and Japanese red pine whereas the alpine zone above 2,600m has communities of dwarf stone pines and various other alpine plant communities. Conversely, the lowlands are used for paddy fields, tea fields, deciduous orchards, agricultural land and housing. Within the biosphere reserve are a range of large and small streams, rivers, lakes, and other open water areas in the Fuji River, Ōi River, and Tenryū River systems.

The alpine zone in the Minami-Alps has a unique distribution of plants and animals that migrated south along the Japanese archipelago during the ice age. With the alpine zone of the Minami-Alps located at the southern end, it is susceptible to global environment changes, and therefore many species are at risk. Even so, the mountain zone is equally suited for a diverse range of species, featuring large, rare raptors such as the snow grouse (rock ptarmigan), the golden eagle, and species endemic to Japan (serow, Japanese dormouse, Japanese black bear etc.).

The hill zone includes areas of human habitation, and in managing these, a diverse range of animals suited to these environments can live freely. Furthermore, the large amounts of rain in the Minami-Alps and surrounding regions transform the topography, thereby supporting habitats for several animals in the forest. Species endemic to the alpine vegetation region include: Saxifraga cernua, Pinus pumila and Lepisorus clathratus; the checkered skipper and Sympistis heliophila.

The vegetation in the Minami-Alps Biosphere Reserve clearly shows the characteristics of a vertical distribution from the hills to the higher levels. Recorded plants growing at altitudes above 800 meters in the Minami Alps include 1,635 species of tracheophytes, 248 species of mosses, and 98 species of lichens. The fauna in this area includes 39 species of mammals, 102 species of birds, 9 species of reptiles, 9 species of amphibians, 10 species of fish, 45 species of shellfish, and 2,871 species of insects.

== Socio-economic characteristics ==
The Minami-Alps Biosphere Reserve is an area of long-standing human habitation with a population of approximately 122,389 since 2010. However this is 2,000 less than the number in the year 2000. Around 60% of the population lives in Minami-Alps City, yet, with the exception of this city, the region is suffering depopulation, with significant outflows of people. For a long time, people have maintained their livelihood using the rich forest resources within the biosphere reserve through processing and transporting wood, digging for gold, controlling water flowing from the mountains and floods with soil and water conservation projects, thus turning the resulting fertile land into cultivated fields. With the difficulty of growing rice in the mountain valleys, varieties of millet, buckwheat, azuki beans, and paper mulberry (for making Japanese paper), and so on have been grown on burnt fields.

Areas in the lowlands along the rivers or on the alluvial fans in the transition areas are used as agricultural land. There are rice paddies in Nagano and Shizuoka prefectures for growing rice, and orchards in Yamanashi for growing fruits like grapes and peaches. The Minami-Alps foothills are also used to grow rice, fruit, tea, and other crops that make use of the soil environment. In the Fuji River area (Hayakawa Town), an old fishing method using bamboo cages in rivers to catch Japanese mitten crabs (as well as ayu, eel, dace, carp, and catfish) is still in practice. The charr and amago trout that are caught in the streams have long been an important source of protein for the local residents. Another popular business is the lunchboxes known as Ikawa Mempa which is a traditional folk art that melds bentwood and lacquering techniques, a complex process that is still used today.

Minami-Alps City engages in extensive fruit cultivation, making it possible to taste freshly-picked fruits including cherries, peaches, plums, and grapes. This area is also the origin of a special variety of plum called the Kiyo, registered by Guinness as being the best plum in the world (2012). It is over three times the size of a regular plum, and sold as a high-end product in Tokyo. The Minami-Alps Biosphere Reserve contributes to the revitalization of the region by working to increase both quality and brand recognition, as well as the production of agriculture, forestry and fishery products unique to the region, relying on the natural features of the Minami-Alps. The rich natural environment around the mountains is currently used for activities such as hiking, walking, nature-watching, camping, fishing, and skiing, with many resources that could also be used for tourism.
