= Mikage, Yamanashi =

Dissolved municipality in Yamanashi prefecture, Japan

Mikage (御影村, Mikage-mura) is a former village that was located in the Nakakoma District of Yamanashi Prefecture, Japan. The village was formed in 1875 from the merger of three villages; Mujina (六科村), Yagoshima (野牛島村) and Kamitakasago (上高砂村). In 1956 it merged with the neighbouring village of Tanooka to form the village of Hatta. On 1 April 2003, Hatta merged with the five other municipalities in Nakakoma District to form the city of Yamanashi.
