= Tanooka, Yamanashi =

Dissolved municipality in Japan

Tanooka (田之岡村, Tano'oka-mura) is a former village that was located in the Nakakoma District of Yamanashi Prefecture, Japan. The village was formed in 1875 from the merger of three villages; Enokihara (榎原村), Shimotakasago (下高砂村) and Tokunaga (徳永村). In 1956 it merged with the neighbouring village of Mikage to form the village of Hatta. On April 1, 2003, Hatta merged with five other municipalities of Nakakoma District to form the city of Yamanashi.
