= Hatta, Yamanashi =

Defunct Japanese village

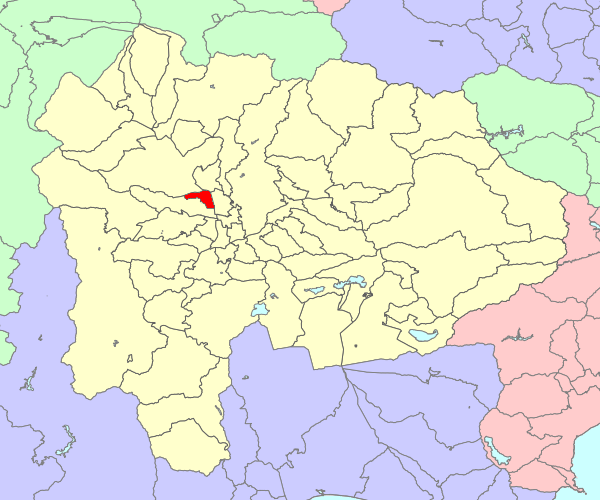
location map of former Hatta Village

Hatta (八田村, Hatta-mura) is a former village that was located in the Nakakoma District of Yamanashi Prefecture, Japan. The village was formed in 1956 from the merger of Mikage and Tanooka villages. In 1982 the village opened an elementary school, followed later by a junior high school. In 2001 the village administration started its own cable television station, "Kirameki 29". On 1 April 2003, Hatta merged with five other municipalities within Nakakoma District (the towns of Kōsai, Kushigata, Shirane and Wakakusa and Ashiyasu village) to form the city of Yamanashi.
