= Daisen-ji (Kōfu) =

Buddhist temple in Kōfu, Yamanashi, Japan

- 大泉寺
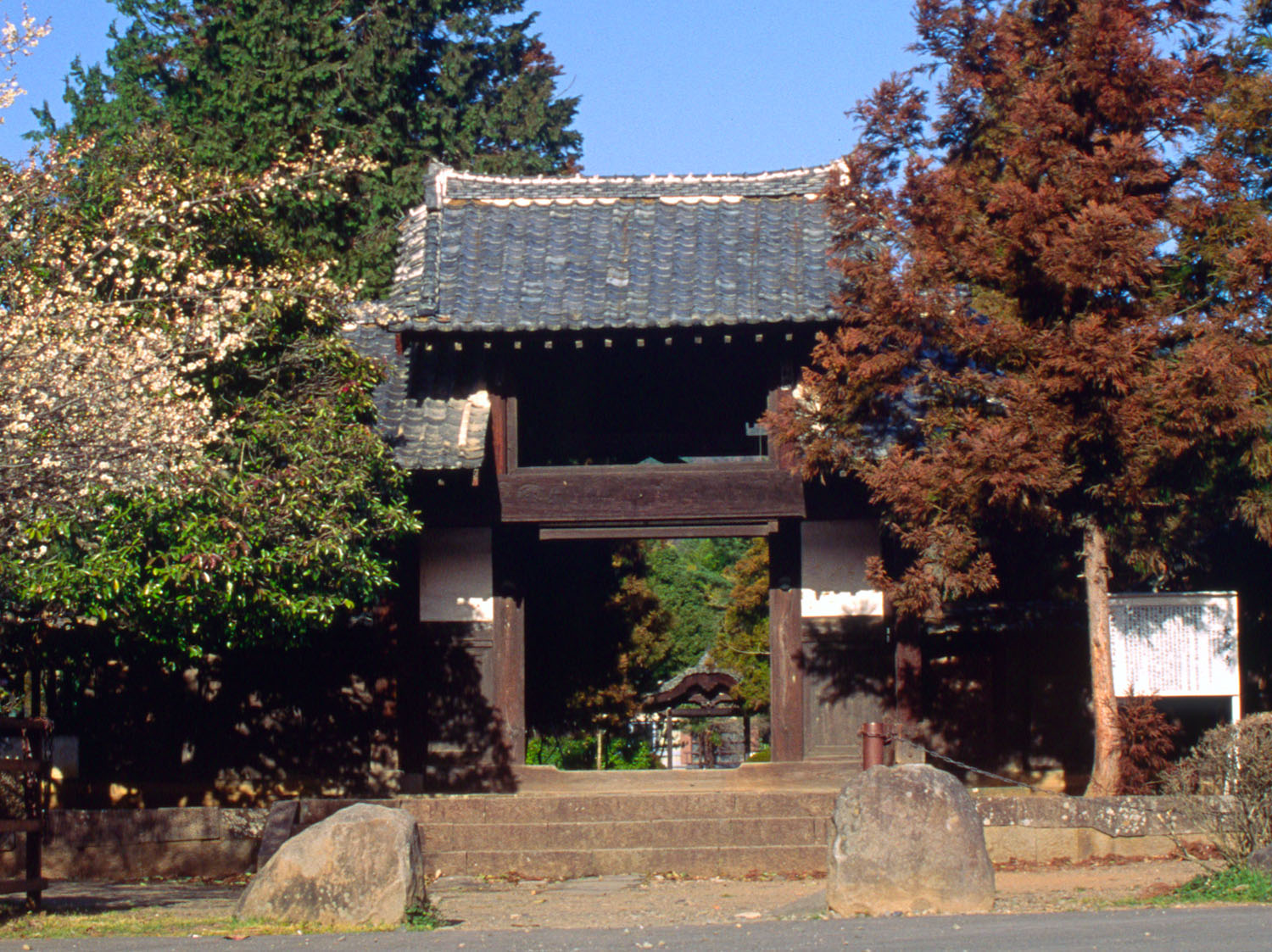
- Daisen-ji gate

- Location within Yamanashi Prefecture Location within Japan

Religion
- Affiliation: Buddhist
- Deity: Shakyamuni Buddha
- Rite: Sōtō Zen
- Status: functional

Location
- Location: 5015 Kofuchūmachi, Kōfu-shi, Yamanashi-ken
- Interactive map of Daisen-ji
- Coordinates: 35°40′37.2″N 138°34′51.0″E

Architecture
- Founder: Takeda Nobutora
- Completed: c.1521
- Important Cultural Property Yamanashi Prefecture Historic Site

Daisen-ji (大泉寺) is a Buddhist temple located in the Kofuchūmachi neighborhood of the city of Kōfu, Yamanashi Prefecture, Japan. It belongs to the Sōtō school of Japanese Zen and its honzon is a statue of Shakyamuni Buddha. The temple's full name is Mannenzan Daisen-ji (万年山 大泉寺).

== History ==
Daisen-ji is located in the northern part of Kōfu, at the opening of the Aikawa alluvial fan, surrounded by mountains north of Kōfu Station. It lies on the western foot of Mt. Okasayama, which extends north from Mt. Atago, a protruding mountain to the east. It runs along Daisenji-koji, one of Kōfu's main north-south thoroughfares, and the Fujikawa River, a tributary of the Nigorigawa River, flows to the west.

During the Sengoku period, Takeda Nobutora, the shugo of Kai Province unified the province after inheriting the clan headship, and in 1519 moved his stronghold from Isawa to Kōfu, which he developed as a castle town centered around his residence, Tsutsujigasaki-kan. According to the Edo period histories Kai no Kuni Shi (History of Kai Province), Daisen-ji was founded in Kamijo, Koma District during the Daiei era (1504-1521) and moved to Kōfu by Takeda Nobutora. It was originally a Shingon temple called Okawa-dera, but in 1521, Nobutora had a dream upon the birth of his eldest son (Takeda Shingen) and had the temple converted and renamed. It became the head temple for all of the Sōtō Zen temples in the Takeda domains. The temple continued to receive protection and estates under Takeda Shingen after he expelled his father Nobutora from the domain. The temple was destroyed by a fire in 1564 and was subsequently rebuilt. On the death of Shingen's eldest daughter Ōbai-in in 1568, a sub-temple was established in Ryūchi, Koma District as a nunnery for her former lady-in-waiting. Following Takeda Nobutora's death in 1574, Takeda Katsuyori held his funeral at Daisen-ji

Even after the fall of the Takeda clan, the Tokugawa clan confirmed the temple's land holdings, and it continued to have jurisdiction over Sōtō Zen temples within the province. However, during the Edo period, the temple's land holdings were reduced. Yanagisawa Yoshiyasu, who became daimyō of the short-lived Kōfu Domain, favored the Ōbaku sect, and founded Eikei-ji. When the Yanagisawa clan was transferred to Kōriyama Domain, and the main hall of Eikei-ji was moved to Daizen-ji, but it was later destroyed by fire.

The temple is five minutes by car from Kōfu Station (North Exit) on the JR Tokai Chūō Main Line.

=== Grave of Takeda Nobutora ===
The Grave of Takeda Nobutora (武田信虎の墓) is located behind his memorial chapel (廟所). It is a narrow compound with three hōkyōintō stone pagodas. The temple promotes these pagodas as the tombs of three generations of the Takeda clan: Takeda Nobutora, Shingen, and Katsuyori. However, based on the inscriptions currently legible, it is more probable that these are the tombs of monks erected between the late Sengoku period and the early Edo period. Nevertheless, the site is a Yamanashi Prefecture Designated Historic Site in 1960.

== Cultural Properties ==
=== Important Cultural Properties ===
- Colored painting on silk of Takeda Nobutora (絹本着色武田信虎像); Sengoku period (1574). This portrait of was painted by Nobutora's third son, Takeda Nobukado (also known as Nobutsuna or Shōyōken). It is a colored painting on silk, measuring 82.0 cm in height and 46.5 cm in width. After Shingen's death in 1573, Nobutora returned to Takato in Shinano Province and died there. Nobukado was residing in Takato Castle at the time, and it is believed that the portrait was painted in person. Nobutora is depicted wearing a dark green undergarment, a white kosode (short-sleeved kimono), and a black-dyed Buddhist robe. It depicts him in his later years, after shaving his head and becoming a Buddhist monk.
- Ink painting on silk: Pine and Plum Blossoms (絹本墨画松梅図). Yuan dynasty. This painting was created by Wu Taisu, a literati painter of the Yuan Dynasty.
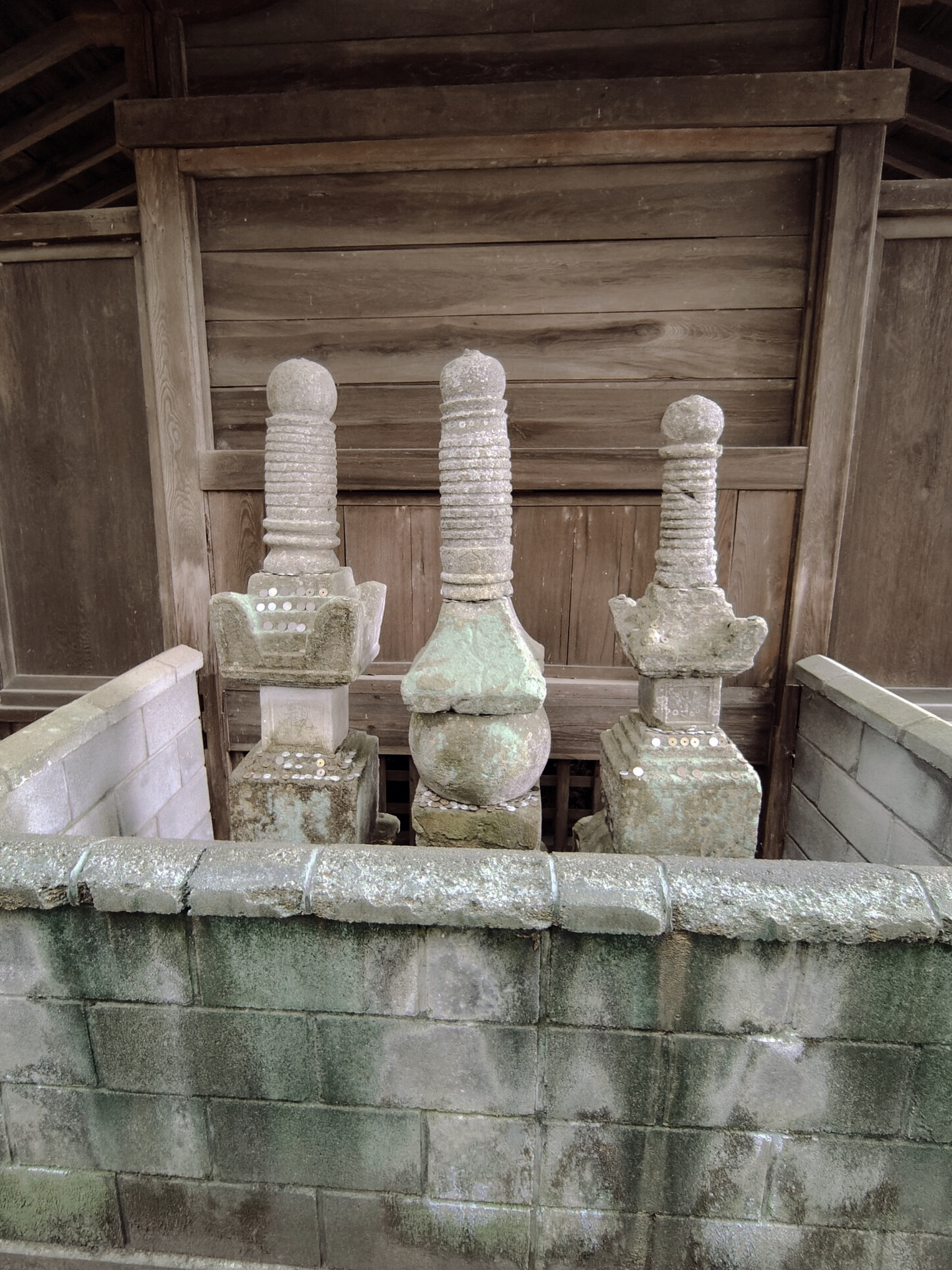
Takeda Nobutora grave

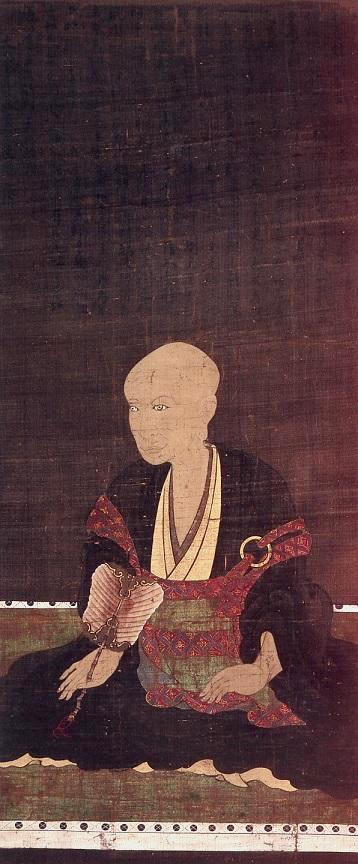
Takeda Nobutora by Takeda Nobukado

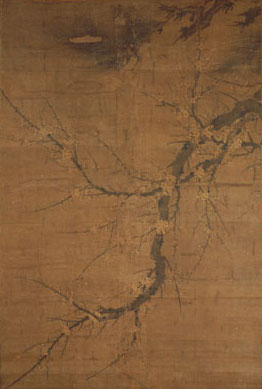
Pine and Plum by Wu Taisu

== See also ==
- List of Historic Sites of Japan (Yamanashi)
- List of Cultural Properties of Japan – paintings (Yamanashi)
