= Wakakusa, Yamanashi =

Dissolved municipality in Nakakoma district, Yamanashi prefecture, Japan

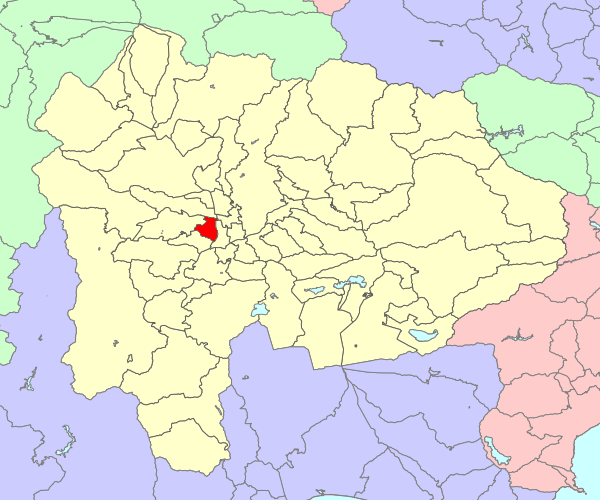
location map of former Wakakusa Town

Wakakusa (若草町, Wakakusa-chō) is an area located within the city of Minami-Alps in Yamanashi Prefecture, Japan. It was formerly a town within Nakakoma District.

As of 2003 it has a population of 11,671.

== Geography ==
Wakakusa is located approximately 12 kilometers from Kofu. It covers an area of 10.29 square kilometers and lies on latitude 35° north and longitude 138° east. Wakakusa is a relatively flat area with many rice fields and orchards. The Kamanashi River (釜無川) forms its eastern boundary.

== History ==
Long ago there were many independent hamlets between the Kamanashi River and the Japan Alps. At the beginning of the Meiji Restoration three hamlets—Tōkaichiba (十日市場), Kagami (加賀美), and Terabe (寺部) merged to form a new village called Mitsue (三枝).

After World War II, Mitsue merged with Tōda (籐田), Asabara, and Kagaminakajō (鏡中條) to form the village of Wakakusa.

Wakakusa was independent until 2003 when the city leaders decided to merge with the towns of Kōsai, Kushigata and Shirane, and the villages of Ashiyasu and Hatta (all from Nakakoma District) to create the city of Minami-Alps.

Devil's Head Tile

=== Devil's Head tile ===
Wakakusa has a long tradition of tilemaking. In the past, the Devil's Head tile adorned the cornices of many houses in the village. It is believed that the face keeps evil spirits away.

== Education ==
Wakakusa contains four schools:

- Wakakusa Elementary School (若草小学校)
- South Wakakusa Elementary School (若草南小学校)
- Wakakusa Junior High School (若草中学校)
- Pitagoras International School (Brazilian)

== Temples ==
Hōzen-ji- Founded in 806 A.D., this temple follows the Nichiren sect of Japanese Buddhism.

Anyoji- This temple follows the Shingon sect of Buddhism. It was founded in 1234 A.D.

== Sister cities ==
- - Kitamura, a village in Hokkaidō, Japan

== Hot springs ==
Yu-Yu Furei Park is located in east-central Wakakusa. In addition to a large municipal park the area also contains a Hot Spring.

== Tōkaichi festival ==
The Tōkaichi festival (十日市) is the most famous festival in Wakakusa. It occurs every year on 10 February.

During the Kamakura period, a distinguished priest, Saint Kakuou, was living in this area. Before he was invited to live here, he had belonged to the famous Koyasan temple in Kii region. On January 10, according to the lunar calendar, he heard an oracle that suggested he carve a statue. He made the statue, and it was deified. People prayed to it day and night.

One day, during the rice-planting season in the same year, a rampaging horse was causing great trouble to the farmers. From nowhere, a boy of 15 or 16 suddenly appeared and grabbed the bit of the horse. Miraculously, the horse was calmed down, and then the farmers could plant their rice peacefully.

A little after this incident, some people noticed that the statue had some mud attached to its feet. People believed that the statue had transformed into the boy and helped the farmers; the guardian deity got the mud when he was dealing with the horse. Since then, people have called it the "Hana-tori Statue" which means, "A statue that leads horses and cows by their noses". They also held an annual festival on January 10, the day when the priest received the oracle. It is said that people from all over Yamanashi came to visit the festival en masse as the rumor of the mythic statue in Tokaichi spread.

Geologically speaking, located at the end of the Midai river alluvial fan, this region around Tokaichi is suitable for both rice cultivation and dry field farming. In addition to this, the region is close to key agricultural and forestry places: Takata, a paddy region in former Tatomi and Kosai towns; Genkata, a dry field farming region in former Shirane town; and Nekata, a forestry region in Masuho town. All of these geological conditions of Tokaichi made it become a big market place where farm products and agricultural machines were exchanged or sold. They say that the history of the market dates back to the Edo era.

More sundry items are now at the Tokaichi market: daruma dolls, good luck charms, household tools, garden plants, and prepared food.

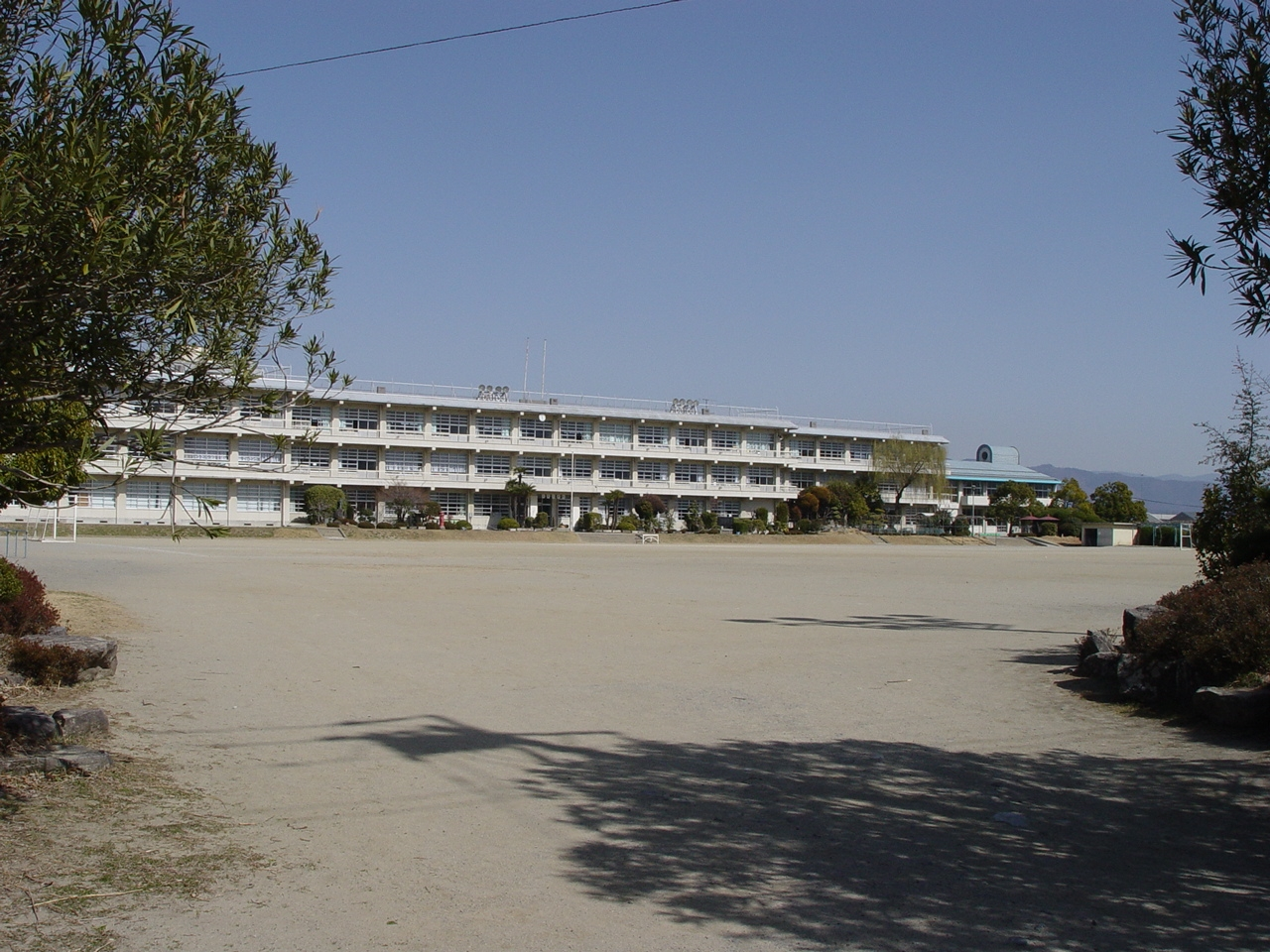
Wakakusa Elementary School

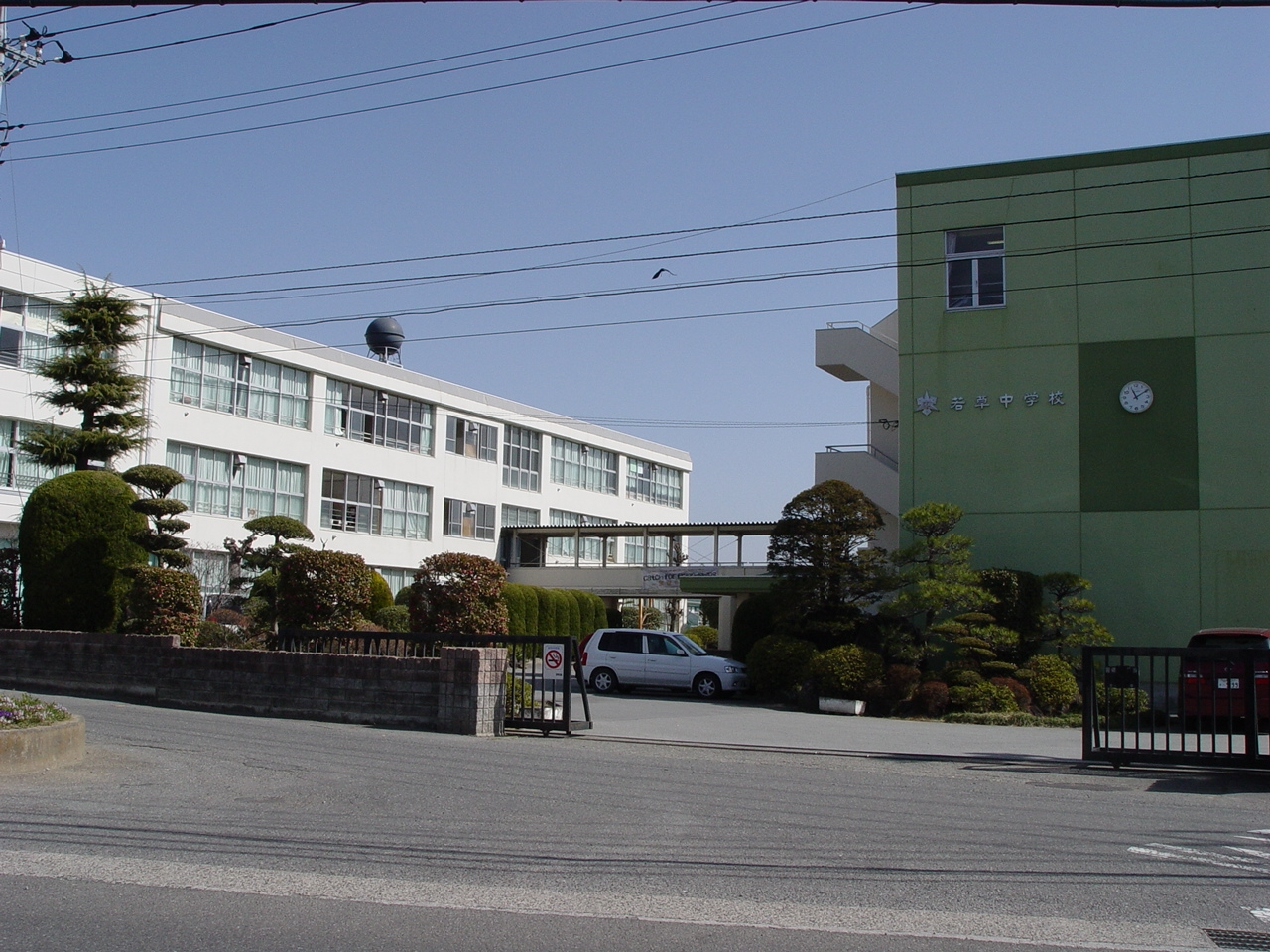
Wakakusa Junior High School

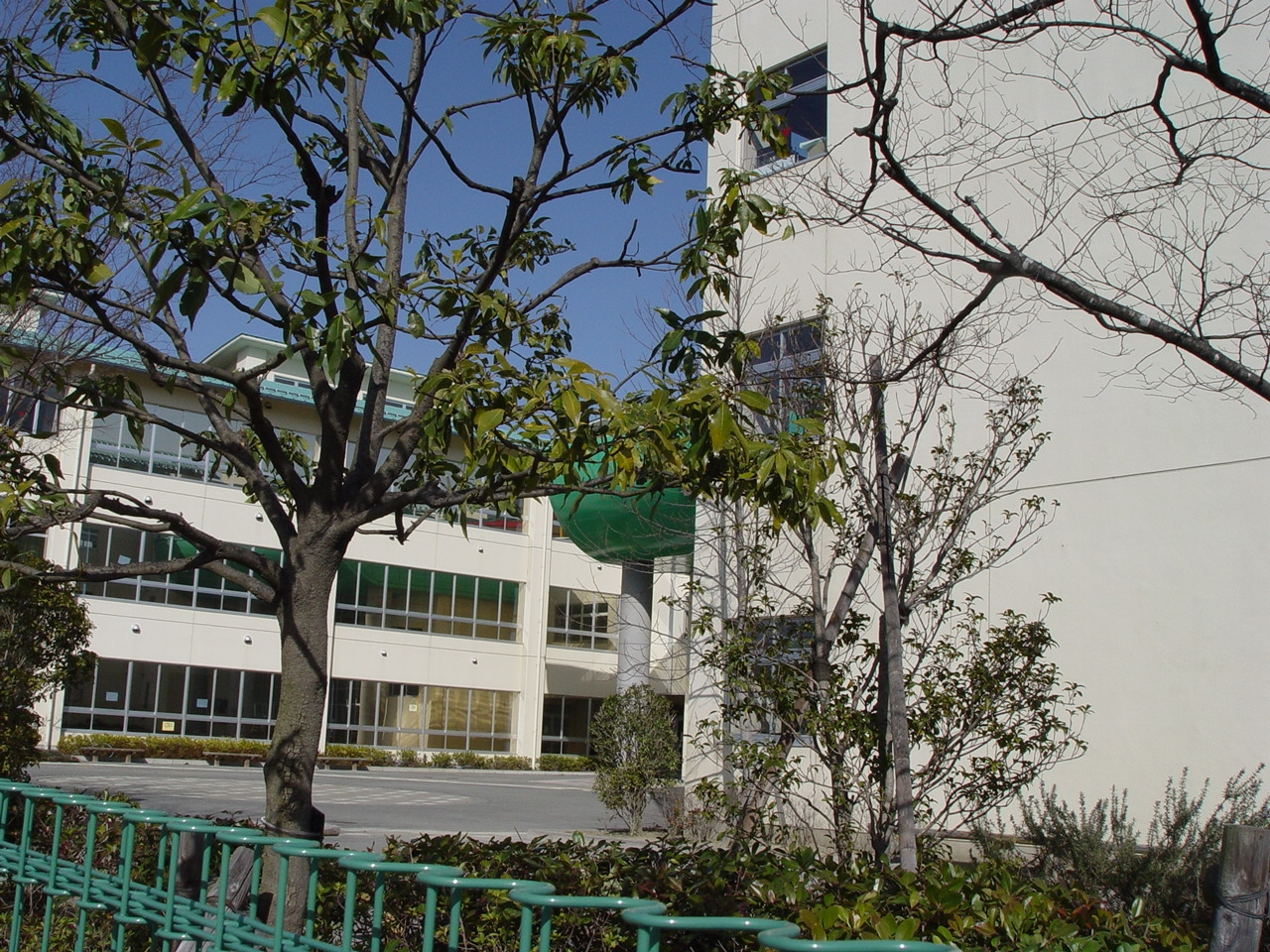
South Wakakusa Elementary School

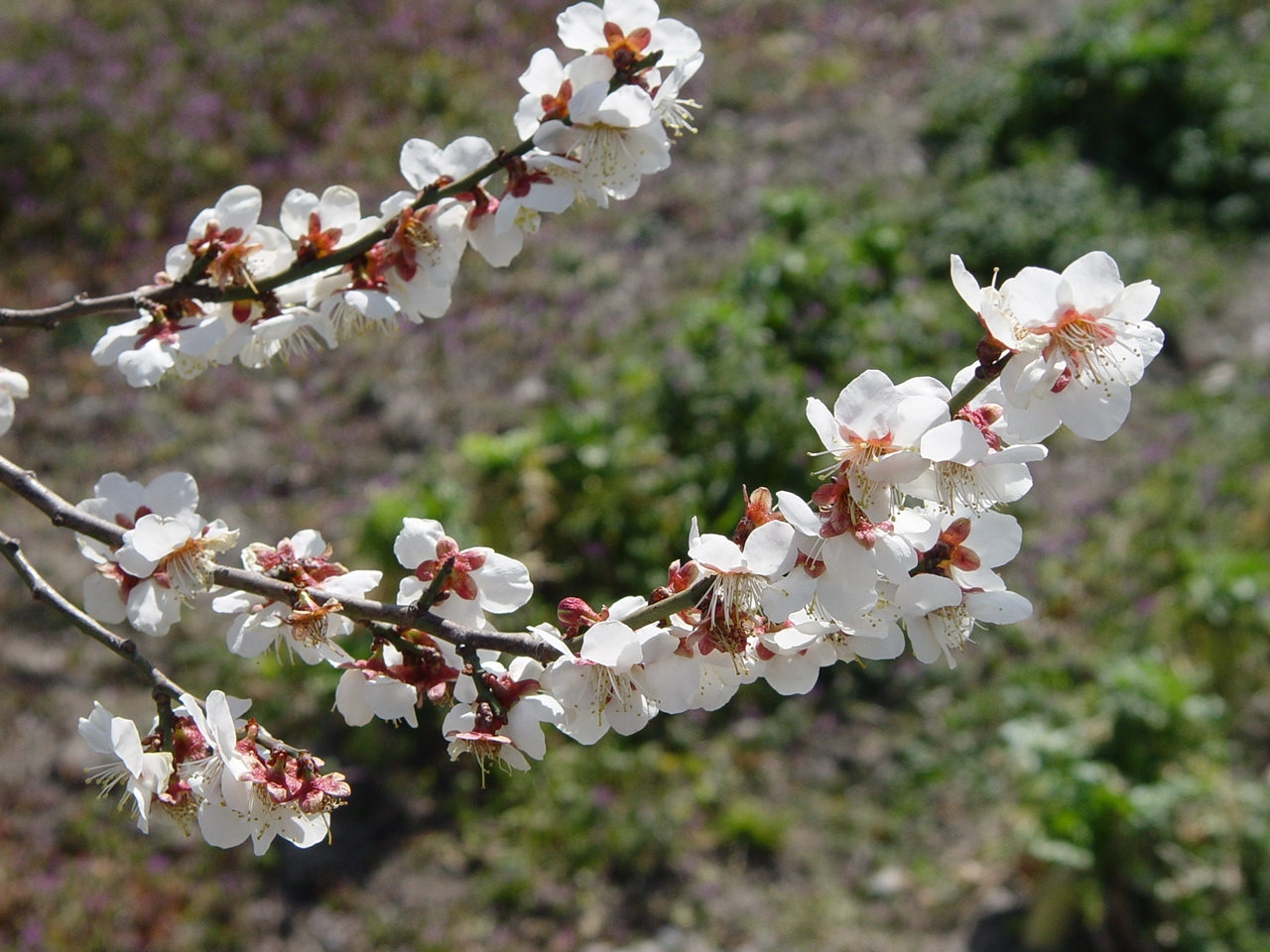
Tree Blossom

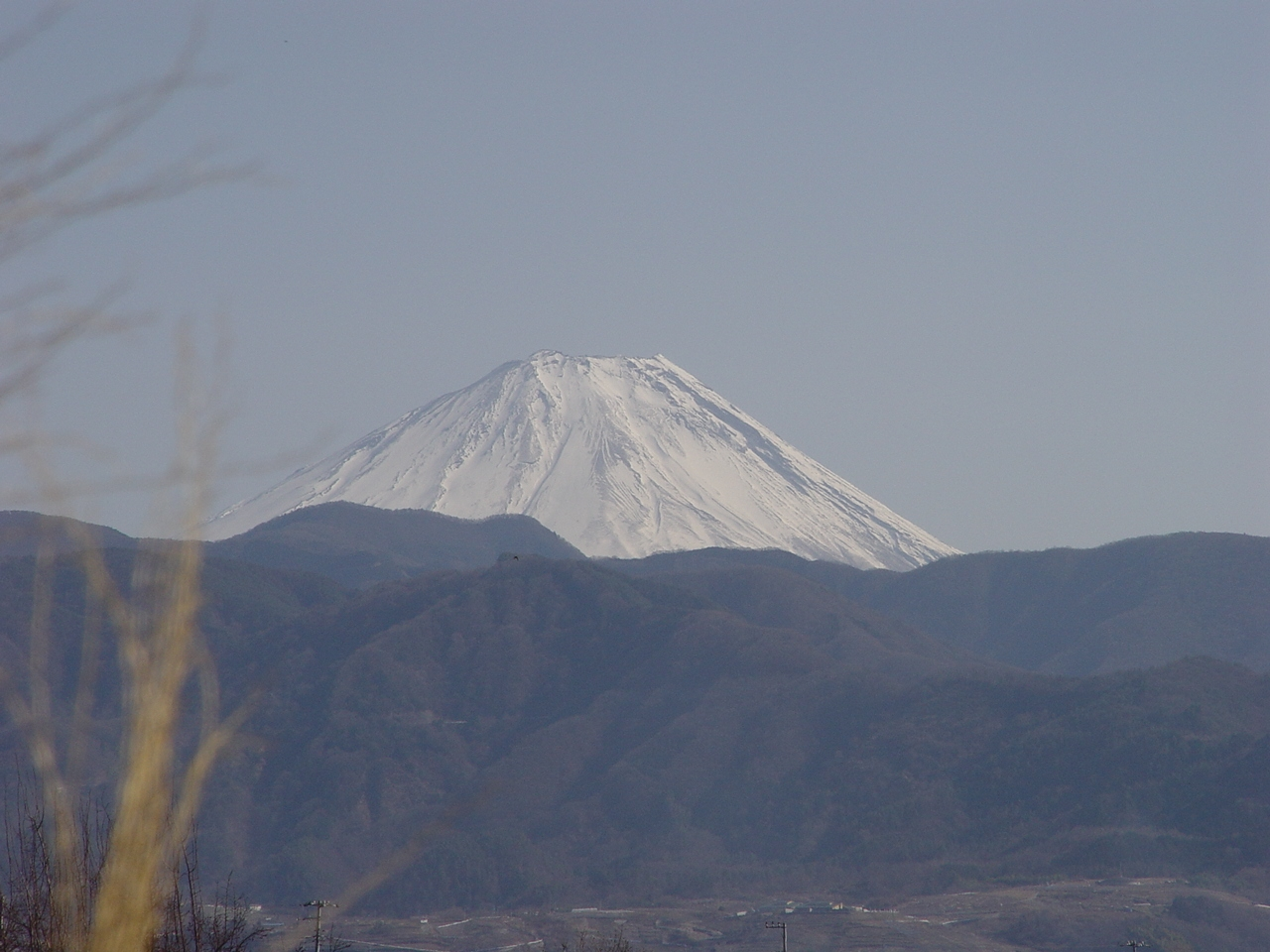
View of Mt. Fuji in Wakakusa

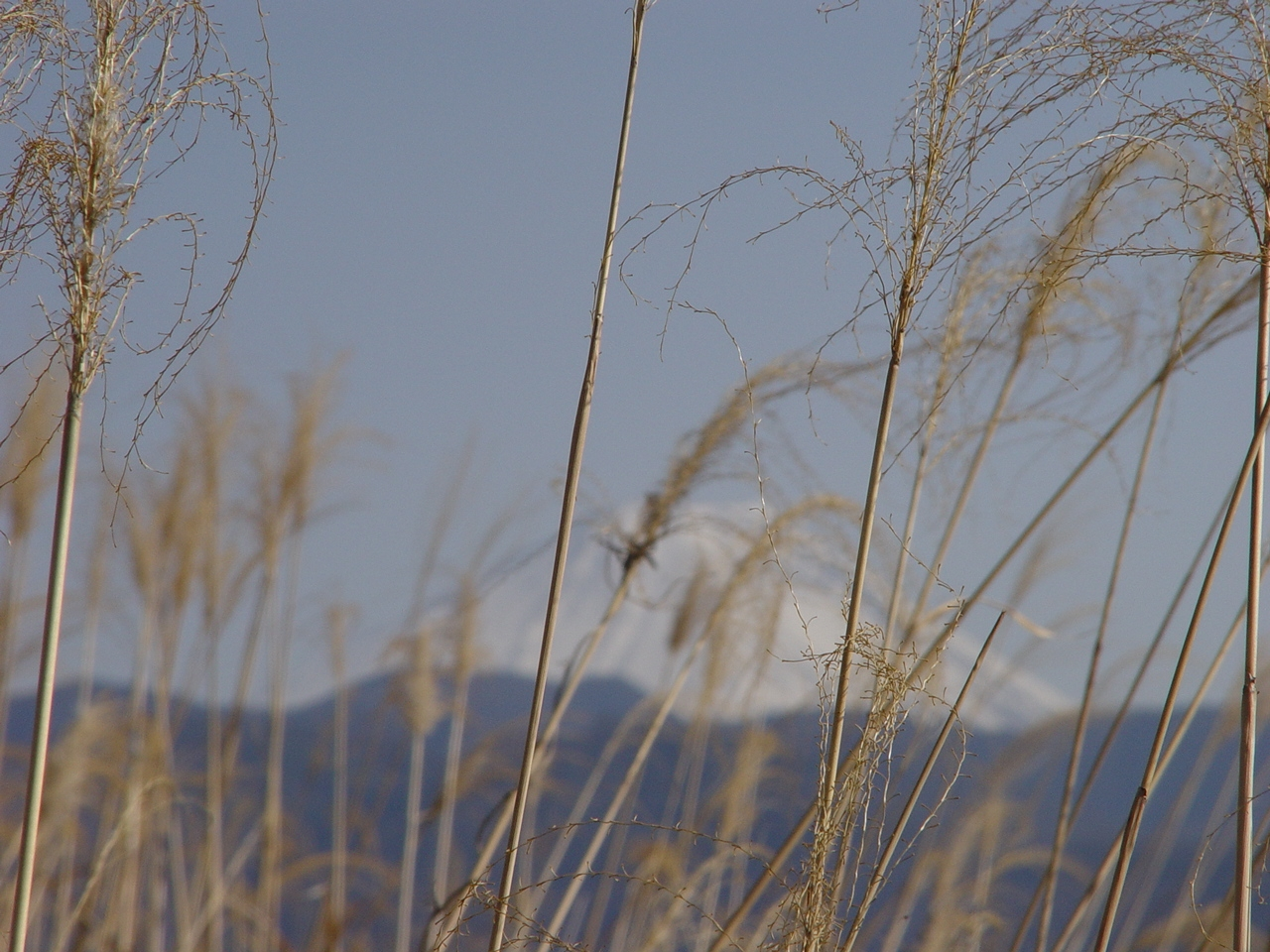
Wild Grass with Mt. Fuji in the background
