= Eanred of Northumbria =

Eanred
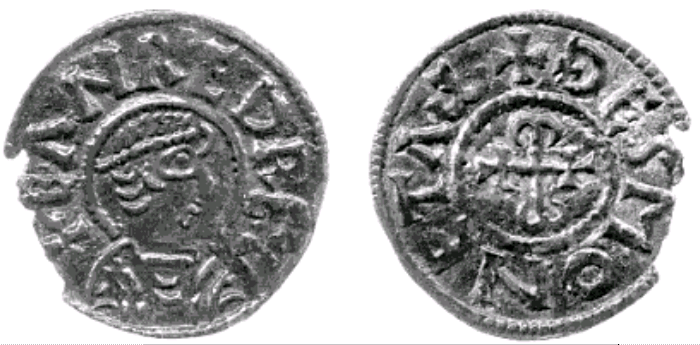
- Coin of King Eanred

King of Northumbria
- Reign: c. 810 – c. 850
- Predecessor: Eardwulf
- Successor: Æthelred II
- Issue: Æthelred
- House: Northumbria
- Father: Eardwulf

Eanred was king of Northumbria in the early ninth century.

Very little is known for certain about Eanred. The only reference made by the Anglo-Saxon Chronicle to the Northumbrians in this period is the statement that in 829 Egbert of Wessex "led an army against the Northumbrians as far as Dore, where they met him, and offered terms of obedience and subjection, on the acceptance of which they returned home", thereby, at least temporarily, extending Egbert's hegemony to the entirety of Anglo-Saxon Britain.

Roger of Wendover states that Eanred reigned from 810 until 840, the twelfth-century History of the Church of Durham records a reign of 33 years, and a recently discovered coin of Eanred has been dated to c. 850 on stylistic grounds. Given the turbulence of Northumbrian history in this period, a reign of this length suggests a figure of some significance. Within a generation of Eanred's death, Anglian monarchy in Northumbria had collapsed.

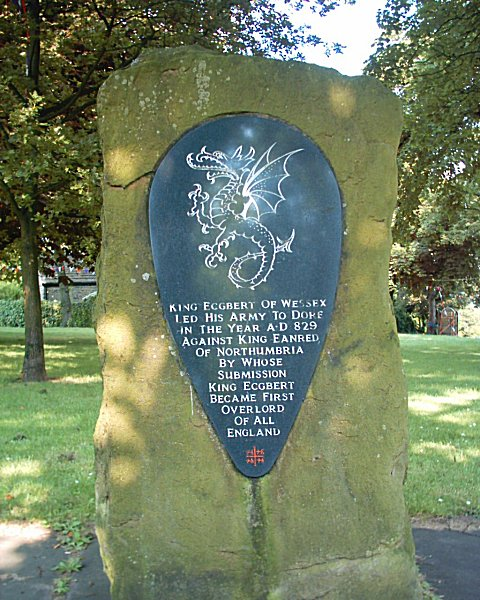
Stone commemorating the meeting between Eanred and Egbert at Dore

Eanred was the son of King Eardwulf, who was deposed by an otherwise unknown Ælfwald in 806. According to the History of the Church of Durham, Ælfwald ruled for two years before Eanred succeeded. However, Frankish sources claim that, after being expelled from England, Eardwulf was received by Charlemagne and then the pope, and that their envoys escorted him back to Northumbria and secured his restoration to power. Therefore the precise nature of the succession of Eanred is unclear. All sources agree that Eanred was eventually succeeded by his son, Æthelred.

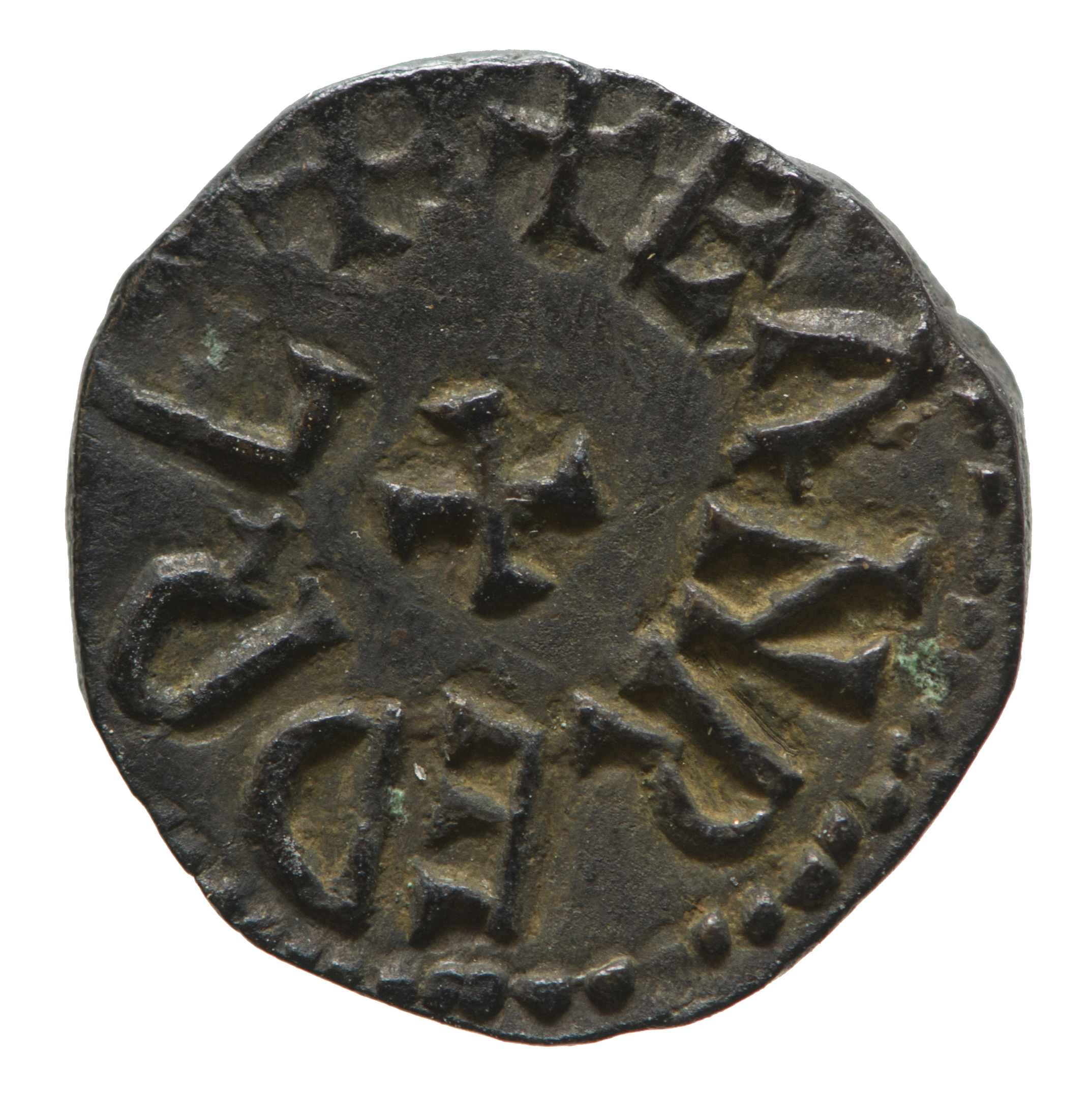
Copper styca of King Eanred

Eanred's reign sees the appearance of the styca, a new style of small coin which replaced the earlier sceat. These stycas were of low silver content, later coins being effectively brass. Produced in York, large numbers have survived and several moneyers are named on the surviving coins, suggesting that they were minted in significant quantities. Higham estimates that hundreds of thousands of stycas were in circulation. The distribution of the coin finds suggests that their principal use was in external trade and that, apart from for the payment of taxes, coins were little used by the great majority of Northumbrians in daily life.
