= Yamanashi Prefectural Museum =

- 山梨県立博物館
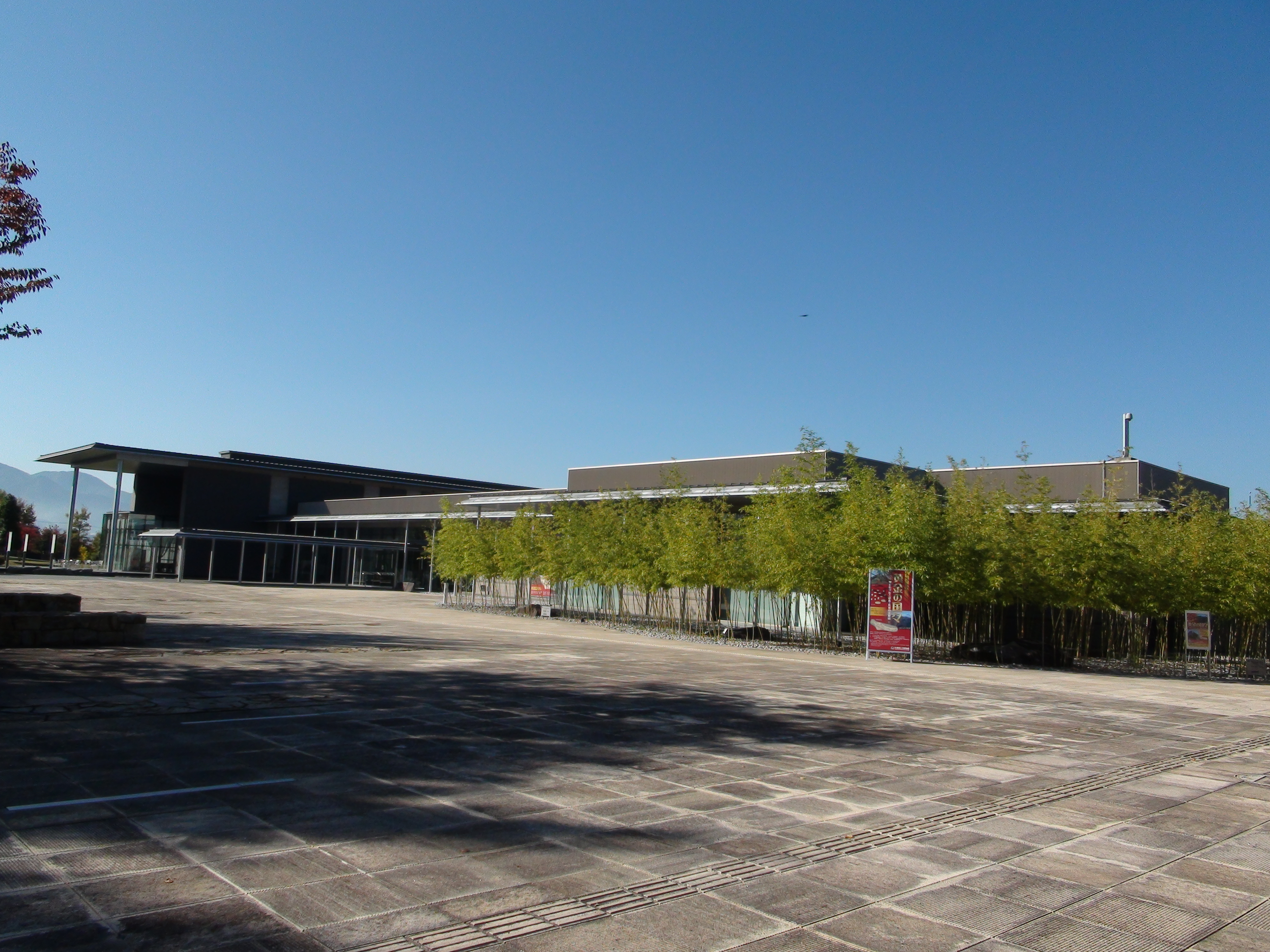
- Interactive map of the Yamanashi Prefectural Museum area

General information
- Location: 1501-1 Misaka-chō, Narita, Fuefuki, Yamanashi Prefecture, Japan
- Coordinates: 35°38′25″N 138°38′55″E
- Opened: 15 October 2005

Website
- Official website

Yamanashi Prefectural Museum (山梨県立博物館, Yamanashi kenritsu hakubutsukan) opened in Fuefuki, Yamanashi Prefecture, Japan in 2005. The collection relates to the natural history, history, and culture of Yamanashi Prefecture; special exhibitions are also held.

== How to get ==
- From Chūō Expressway Ichinomiya Misaka IC

Takes about 10minutes

- Use Fuefuki city bus from Isawaonsen station

== See also ==
- Kai Province
- List of Historic Sites of Japan (Yamanashi)
- List of Cultural Properties of Japan - paintings (Yamanashi)
