= Church of St Mary and St Hardulph, Breedon on the Hill =

Church in Leicestershire, England

Breedon Church
- The Church of St Mary and St Hardulph, Breedon on the Hill
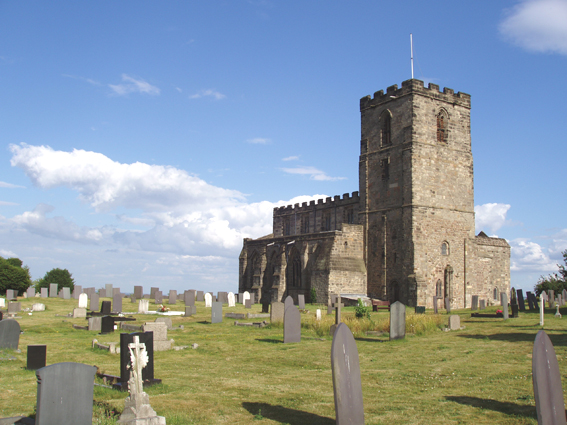

- Location within Leicestershire
- 52°48′22″N 1°24′0″W
- OS grid reference: SK 40557 23335
- Country: England
- Denomination: Church of England
- Churchmanship: Broad Church

History
- Dedication: St Mary and St Hardulph

Architecture
- Heritage designation: Grade I listed building
- Architectural type: English Gothic

Administration
- Province: Canterbury
- Diocese: Diocese of Leicester
- Parish: Breedon on the Hill

The Priory Church of St Mary and St Hardulph is the Church of England parish church of Breedon on the Hill, Leicestershire, England. The church has also been known as Breedon Priory.

The present church, which had been preceded by a minster (an Anglo-Saxon monastery) from the 7th century, contains the largest collection, and some of the finest examples, of Anglo-Saxon sculptures. It also contains a notable family pew and Renaissance-era church monuments to the Shirley family, who bought the manor of Breedon after it was surrendered to the Crown in 1539 during the Dissolution of the Monasteries. The largest of these monuments is for Sir George Shirley. It was made over 20 years before his death and includes a life-sized skeleton carved in alabaster.

The church stands on the top of Breedon Hill, within the remains of an Iron Age hill fort called The Bulwarks. The hill is flanked to the south by the 400 houses of Breedon on the Hill village, and encroached on the east by Breedon Quarry. Breedon church is a nationally important building, with a Grade I listing for its exceptional architectural interest.

== History ==
=== Breedon Minster ===
A minster (an Anglo-Saxon monastery) was founded in about 675 on the site of an Iron Age hill fort known as the Bulwarks. Consent was given by King Æthelred of Mercia, third son of Penda of Mercia (who ruled until 704 according to the Anglo-Saxon Chronicle). The land was given by the princeps Frithuric (Latin Frethericus) with the stipulation that Hædda would be made the abbot. Frithuric is a candidate for the four saints who may have been buried here. The site of the Anglo-Saxon church, buildings and cemetery has never been fully determined but has probably now been lost to twentieth-century quarrying.

The Peterborough Chronicle of Hugh Candidus records that four saints were buried at Breedon-on-the-Hill - St Ærdulf (said in that document to be a king) and monks St Cotta, St Benna and St Fretheric.

Hædda was to become a Bishop of Lichfield and later the minster trained Tatwine, known for his rhyming riddles and for his later ascension to be Archbishop of Canterbury from 731 until his death in 734. The lands that supported the minster were added to by Frithuric and by a purchase from King Æthelred of Mercia. By the time of the Domesday Book in 1086 most of these lands were no longer held by the minster, and the manors surrounding Breedon had been given by William the Conqueror to the de Ferrers family, who later became the Earls of Derby, under the vill name of Tonge ('Tunge cum omnibus appendiciis'). The book records that the tenant-in-chief was Henry de Ferrers.

=== Breedon Priory ===
Breedon priory was founded as an Augustinian house in around 1120, on the site of the Iron Age hillfort, like the earlier Anglo-Saxon minster. The priory was a cell of Nostell Priory in Yorkshire and there seems to have been between three and five canons in residence at any one time, usually from Nostell. Candidates for Prior were also usually selected by Nostell. Gervase, a prior of Breedon, attempted to gain independence for the priory from Nostell, but failed and subsequently resigned in 1244.

In 1441 a visit from William Alnwick, Bishop of Lincoln (Leicestershire was historically within the Diocese of Lincoln), found the monastery to be dilapidated and in debt. By 1535 there was no resident community at the priory, which was now occupied only by the prior. The Valor Ecclesiasticus of 1535 recorded the priory had an annual income, after expenses, of £24. 10s. 4d.

The priory was surrendered for dissolution in November 1539. It was later sold to Francis Shirley, head of the local manorial family, who were recusants. After the Dissolution, the eastern part of the priory with the formerly central tower was retained for parish use. The nave and other buildings were later demolished.

==== Priors of Breedon Priory ====
- Elias, occurred between 1153 and 1160.
- Thomas, occurred late 12th century.
- William, occurred about 1170–80.
- Ralph, occurred between 1175 and 1207.
- Gervase, presented 1223, resigned 1244.
- Walter of Stokes, presented 1245.
- Thomas of Acomb, occurred 1288, died 1293.
- William Wyles, presented 1293, occurred 1299.
- Robert of Pontefract, presented 1314, died 1324.
- John de Insula, presented 1324, left after elected Prior of Nostell in 1328.
- William Buttrebuske, presented 1328, occurred 1341.
- Richard, occurred 1348.
- Adam, occurred 1384, elected Prior of Nostell, 1385.
- Robert of Qwyxlay, occurred before 1393.
- Adam, presented, for the second time, 1393, died 1402.
- William of Altofts, presented 1402. (fn. 55)
- John Amyas, presented 1411. (fn. 56)
- William Horbury, presented 1422, occurred 1439.
- James Byrtby, presented 1439, resigned 1449.
- Stephen Melsymby, presented 1449.
- William Yorke, presented 1450, died 1472.
- John Hyndrewell, presented 1472, died 1495.
- John Emley, presented 1495, died 1503.
- Richard Bretaynger, presented 1503, died 1513.
- John Brydell, presented 1513, died 1524.
- Robert Harrop, presented 1524, occurred 1535.
- Thomas Clarke, occurred 1529 and 1536; died 1537.
- Henry Huntingdon, presented 1537.

=== Later history ===
The church has been a Grade I listed building since 1962, which categorises it as a building of exceptional interest.

== The church ==
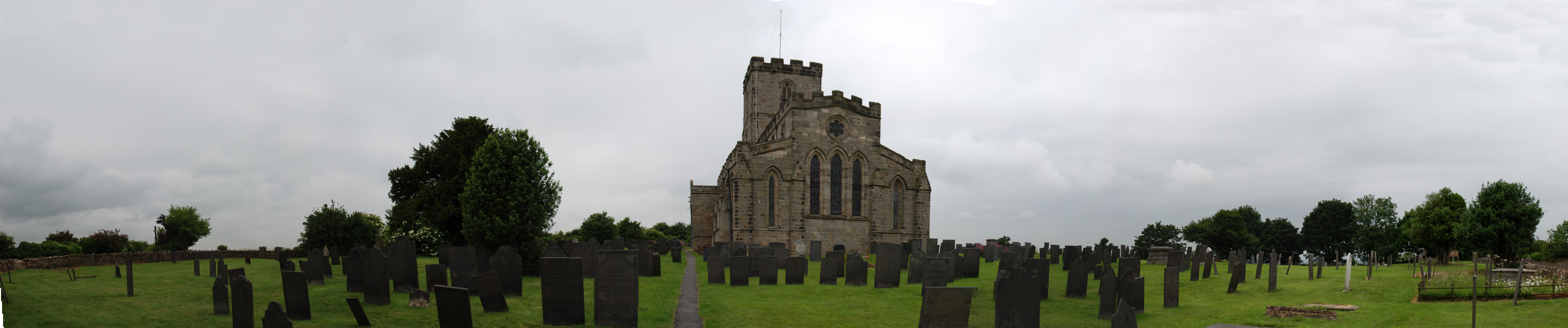
The Church

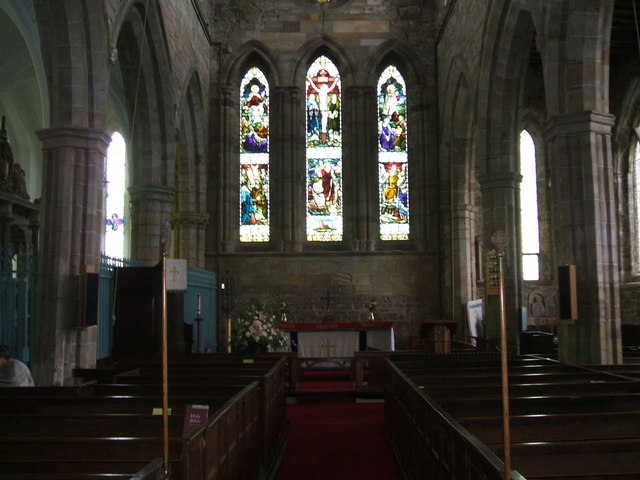
Interior looking east to the altar

=== Anglo-Saxon carvings ===
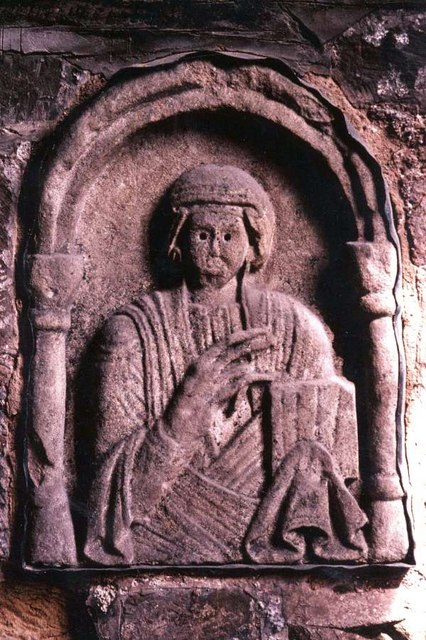
The Virgin of Breedon

The church contains a series of important Saxon relief sculpture, some of which may be amongst the earliest to survive in England. These carvings came from the original Saxon abbey church. They are not the earliest finds as Neolithic artefacts have also been found on the hill.

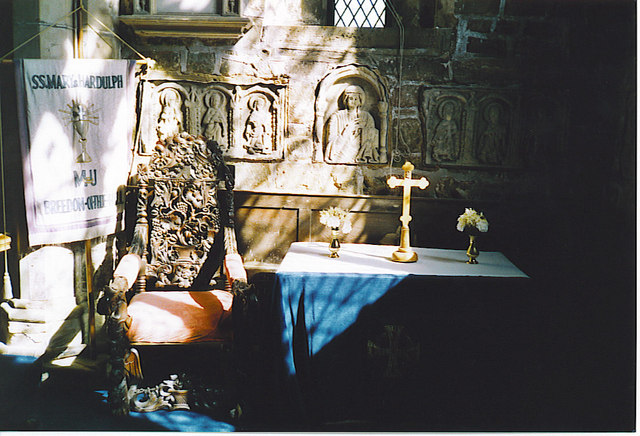
Anglo Saxon Carvings of the virgin and the apostles

Around the church are many early carvings which are frequently included as stones in the interior walls. However they are wrapped in lead sheet as though they are not intended to be structural. The carvings are dated to the 9th century and include Celtic patterns, lions, people, cocks and other birds that are pecking at vines.

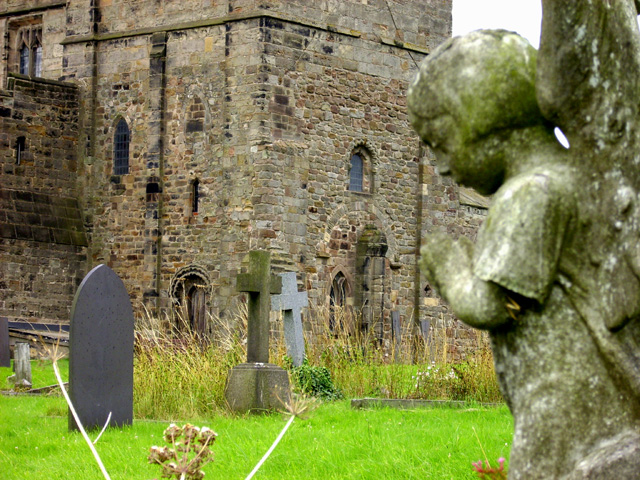
Tower showing the many different centuries of carving present in the church

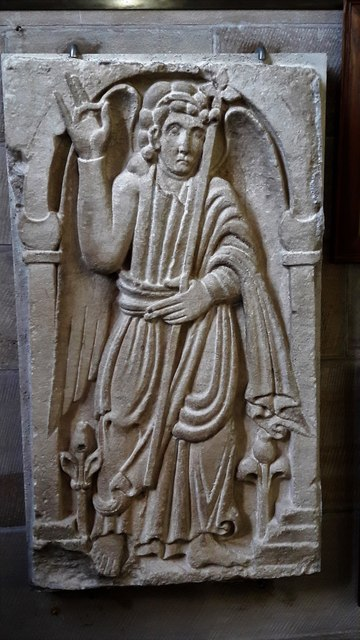
The Breedon Angel

=== Shirley monuments ===
The church contains many 16th and 17th century tombs of the Shirley family which bought the monastery site. There are two substantial tomb chests carved from Chellaston alabaster. The oldest chest tomb is for Francis Shirley and his wife. Around the chest are carved mourners arranged in pairs. This tomb is dated 1571. The other, similar tomb is for John Shirley and his wife, and is dated 1585. Both of these tombs were made by Richard and Gabriel Royley of Burton upon Trent.

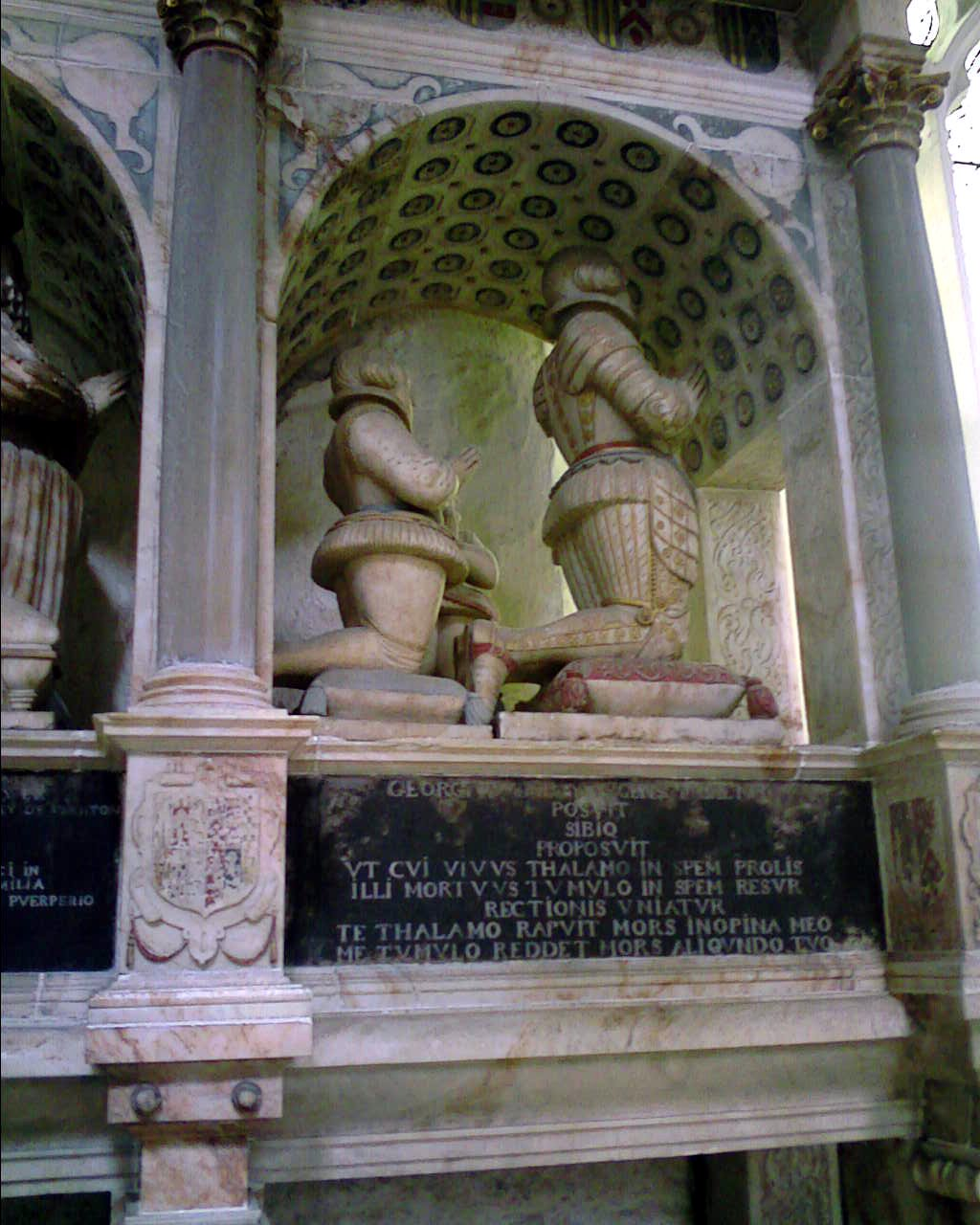
Carving of George Shirley (died 1588) on the right-hand side of his monument

The tomb of Sir Francis Shirley was repaired after 60 years by his great-grandson, Thomas Shirley. The latter recorded that even after 60 years, Francis' body was well preserved, with only a black mark apparent on one of his toes but with no sign of rot. His body was re-wrapped in material and returned to his tomb.

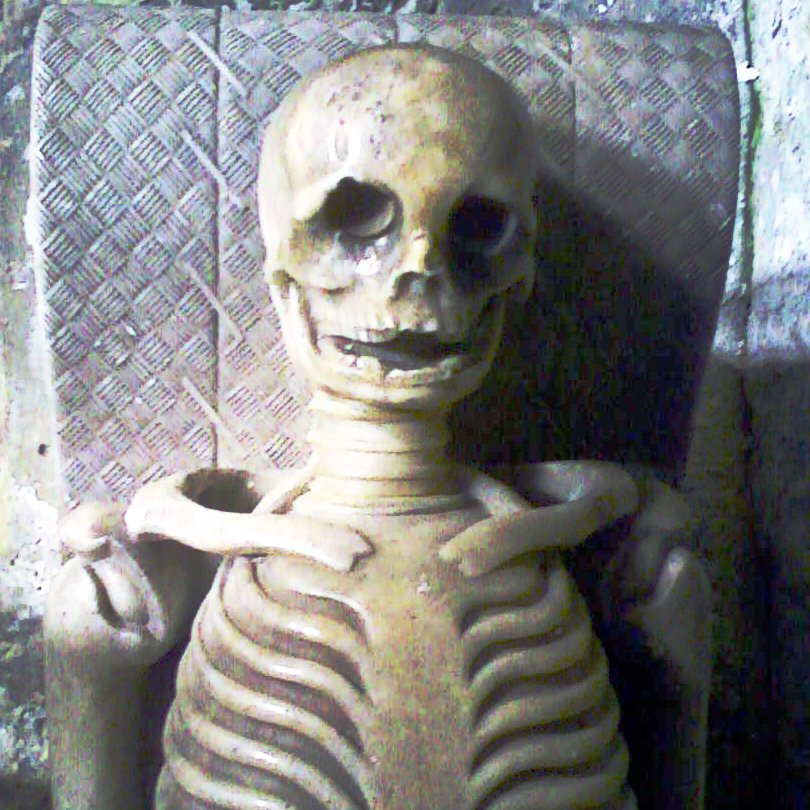
Alabaster skeleton at the foot of George Shirley's monument

Three substantial tombs were constructed to memorialize Sir George Shirley, his father John, and his grandfather Thomas. By far the largest monument dominating the inside of the church is that dedicated to Sir George Shirley. It was made over 20 years before Shirley died in 1622. It is dated 1598 and consists of three storeys. On the bottom storey is a realistic skeleton carved from alabaster and showing the mortality of those portrayed above. The inclusion of this cadaver in the design was unusual for the time.

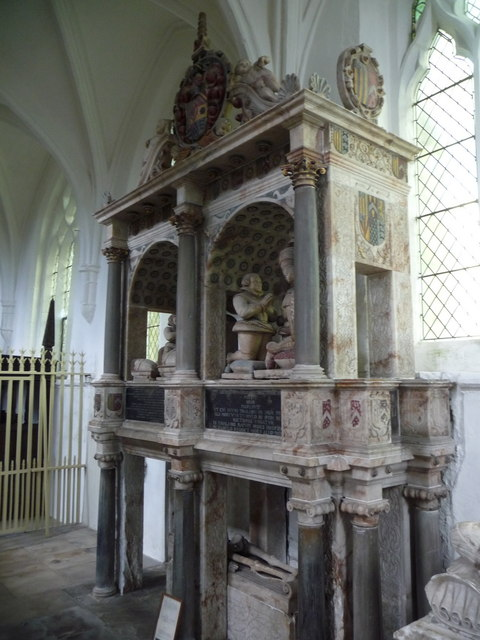
Sir George Shirley memorial

The second storey is supported on six pillars and the space is divided into two arched spaces. To the right and facing right in prayer is Sir George Shirley with his two sons behind him. All three figures are dressed in brightly painted period dress and the clothes include details in gold. In the left arch is his wife (d. 1595), daughter, and two babies. According to the Latin inscription, Shirley's wife died aged 29 whilst giving birth.

The third storey, again supported by six more pillars, is a canopy made in stone and incorporating a large, central, carved coat of arms. The monument was constructed from large blocks of alabaster. It was rebuilt in the 19th century by the stonemason Thomas Allt, who added his signature to the work.

=== Pews ===
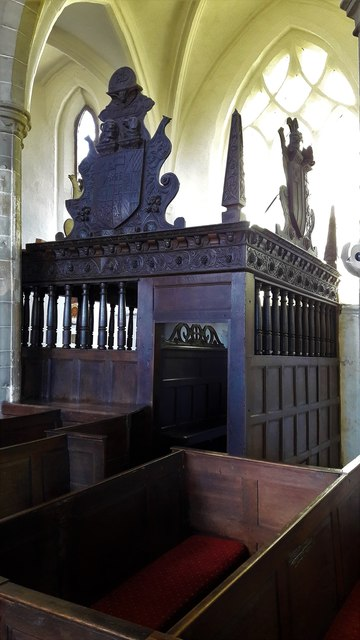
The Shirley pew

The Shirley family pew was carved in 1627. The rest of the box pews date from the 18th century. The Shirley family pew now sits to the left of the main monument in the north aisle. In the past this wooden structure was said to be in the main body of the church. It is appropriate that it is now in the vaulted north aisle, as this entire aisle was in the separate ownership of the Shirley family until the 1950s.

== Churchyard ==
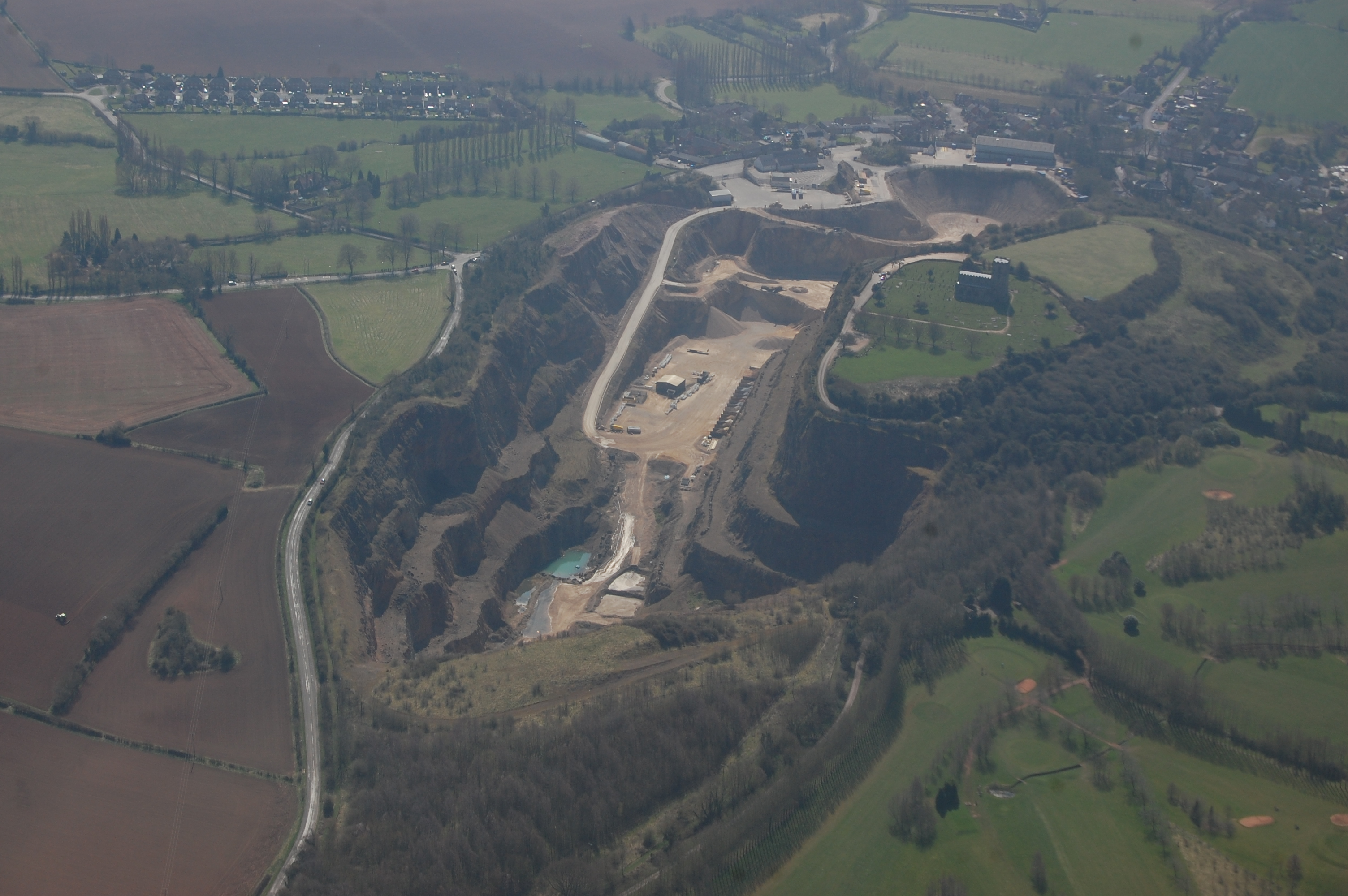
View from the air, showing quarry

The churchyard contains one war grave, of a soldier of the Machine Gun Corps of World War I.

== St Hardulf ==
St Hardulf has been claimed to be King Eardwulf of Northumbria. The connection has been made by several historians. The suggestion is based on a 12th-century list of the burial places of saints compiled at Peterborough. This calls the Saint Hardulph to whom Breedon was dedicated "Ærdulfus rex"— Ærdulf the king — and states that he was buried at Breedon. Others do not make this connection with the Northumbrian king but make a connection between a holy man (but not identified as a king) Hardulf, of Breedon, and St Modwenna of nearby Burton on Trent, as recorded by the early twelfth-century Abbot Geoffrey.

== Church organisation ==
Breedon parish is in the Deanery of North West Leicestershire, the Diocese of Leicester and the Province of Canterbury. It is part of the Ashby and Breedon Team Ministry now renamed the Flagstaff Family of Churches which comprises the following churches:

- St Mary the Virgin, Coleorton
- St John's Chapel, Coleorton
- St Matthew's Church, Worthington
- St Helen's Church, Ashby-de-la-Zouch
- Holy Trinity, Ashby-de-la-Zouch
- All Saints Church, Isley Walton

== See also ==
- List of English abbeys, priories and friaries serving as parish churches

== Cited texts ==
- Hoskins, W.G. (ed.); McKinley, R.A. (1951). "The Priory of Breedon". A History of the County of Leicestershire, Volume 2. Victoria County History. pp. 8–10.
- New, Anthony S B (1985). A Guide to the Abbeys of England And Wales. London: Archibald Constable & Co. pp. 76–78. ISBN 0-09-463520-X.
- Pevsner, Nikolaus (1960). Leicestershire and Rutland. The Buildings of England. Harmondsworth: Penguin Books. pp. 71–75.
