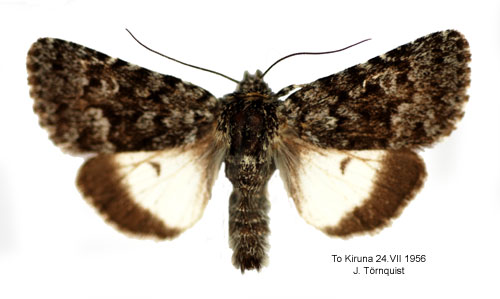

Scientific classification
- Domain: Eukaryota
- Kingdom: Animalia
- Phylum: Arthropoda
- Class: Insecta
- Order: Lepidoptera
- Superfamily: Noctuoidea
- Family: Noctuidae
- Genus: Sympistis
- Species: S. heliophila

Binomial name
- Sympistis heliophila (Paykull, 1793)

= Sympistis heliophila =

Species of moth

Sympistis heliophila is a species of moth in the family Noctuidae (the owlet moths). It is found in Europe and northern Asia (excluding China) and North America.

The MONA or Hodges number for Sympistis heliophila is 10156.
