= Ælfwald II of Northumbria =

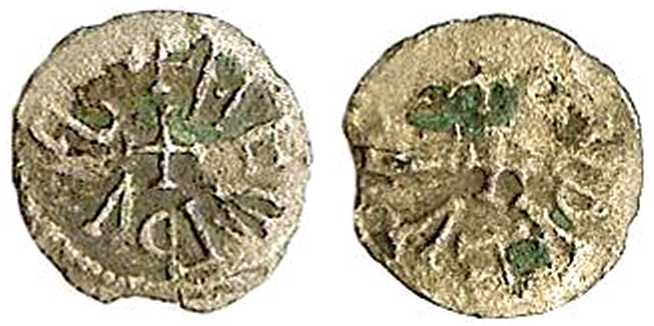
Coin of King Ælfwald II of Northumbria (806–808)

Ælfwald II, according to one tradition, reigned as king of Northumbria following the deposition of Eardwulf in 806. This information appears only in the anonymous tract De primo Saxonum adventu and in the later Flores Historiarum of Roger of Wendover. Roger states that Ælfwald had overthrown Eardwulf.

Ælfwald allegedly reigned for two years before Eardwulf returned, restored to power with the aid of the Emperor Charlemagne and of Pope Leo III. Alternatively, Eardwulf's son Eanred may have succeeded to the throne, rather than Eardwulf.

While only late and exiguous written sources for Ælfwald's reign have survived, modest numbers of coins from his reign exist - minted at York by a moneyer named Cuthheard, who also produced all known coins of Eardwulf's reign.

Lakeland author W. G. Collingwood in a 1917 book, The Likeness of King Elfwald: A Study of Iona and Northumbria, imagined the life of Ælfwald. The work, based on Collingwood's long study of Northumbria which led to his 1919 work Northumbrian Crosses of the pre-Norman Age, was well regarded and has been reprinted.

Preceded by Eardwulf	King of Northumbria; 806–808	Succeeded by Eardwulf or Eanred
