= Hōzen-ji =

Buddhist temple in Yamanashi Prefecture, Japan

Hōzen-ji 法善寺
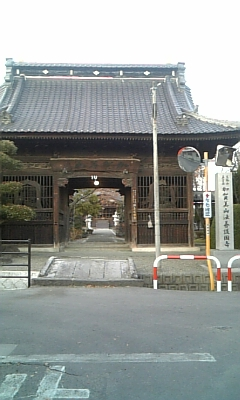
- Hōzen-ji Sanmon

- Hōzen-ji Hōzen-ji (Japan)

Religion
- Affiliation: Buddhism
- Deity: Amida Nyōrai
- Rite: Kōyasan Shingon-shū

Location
- Location: 3509 Kagami, Minami-Alps-shi, Yamanashi-ken
- Country: Japan
- Interactive map of Hōzen-ji 法善寺
- Coordinates: 35°36′12″N 138°29′05″E

Architecture
- Founder: Kūkai
- Completed: 822 AD

Website
- www.kagamisan.com

Hōzen-ji (法善寺), is a Buddhist temple belonging to the Shingon school of Japanese Buddhism, located in the city of Minami-Alps, Yamanashi, Japan. Its main image is a statue of Amida Nyōrai.

== History ==
A temple named Eizen-ji founded in 802 AD in what is now part of the city of Hokuto, Yamanashi, but was relocated and re-founded by Kūkai in 822 AD. During the Heian period, the area came under the control of Kagami Tomomitsu (1143 - 1230), a local warlord and progenitor of the Takeda clan and became the Buddhist bettō temple controlling the nearby Shinto shrine of Takeda Hachiman-gu (in what is now Nirasaki, Yamanashi), the tutelary shrine of the spirits of the Takeda clan. The temple was relocated in 1208 to its present location. The temple continued to be sponsored by the Takeda clan through the Sengoku period, and was later protected by Toyotomi Hideyoshi and Tokugawa Ieyasu after the fall of the Takeda clan. In the Edo period, Shogun Tokugawa Iemitsu confirmed the temple's landholdings, which included nine subsidiary temples and 20 chapels in 1642. However, the temple burned down in 1781 and never regained its former prosperity. During World War II the entire region along with the temple was destroyed in a bombing raid with just one statue of Fudo Myo-o, The Buddhist Spirit of Disciple and Firm Moral survived. The statue has now become the main attraction of the temple.

== Cultural properties ==
=== Important cultural properties ===
==== Hōzen-ji Hannyakyō Sutra ====
Hōzen-ji has a copy of the Mahaprajnaparamita Sutra (紙本墨書大般若経, Shihonbokusho Dai-Hannyakyō) from the Kamakura period in black ink on yellow paper consisting of 561 volumes of the 600 volume sutra, with each volume containing 32-35 pages with a height of 26.0 cm and width of 13.0 cm. Every ten volumes is housed in a small lacquer box, which is further housed in one of six larger boxes. The copy is dated 1254 and was a donation by Ichijō Nobunaga, a son of Takeda Nobumitsu to the Takeda Hachiman-gu. The sutra was transferred to Hōzen-ji on the separation of Shinto from Buddhism in the early Meiji period. It was designated an Important Cultural Property of Japan on April 5, 1905

== Gallery ==
West Entrance

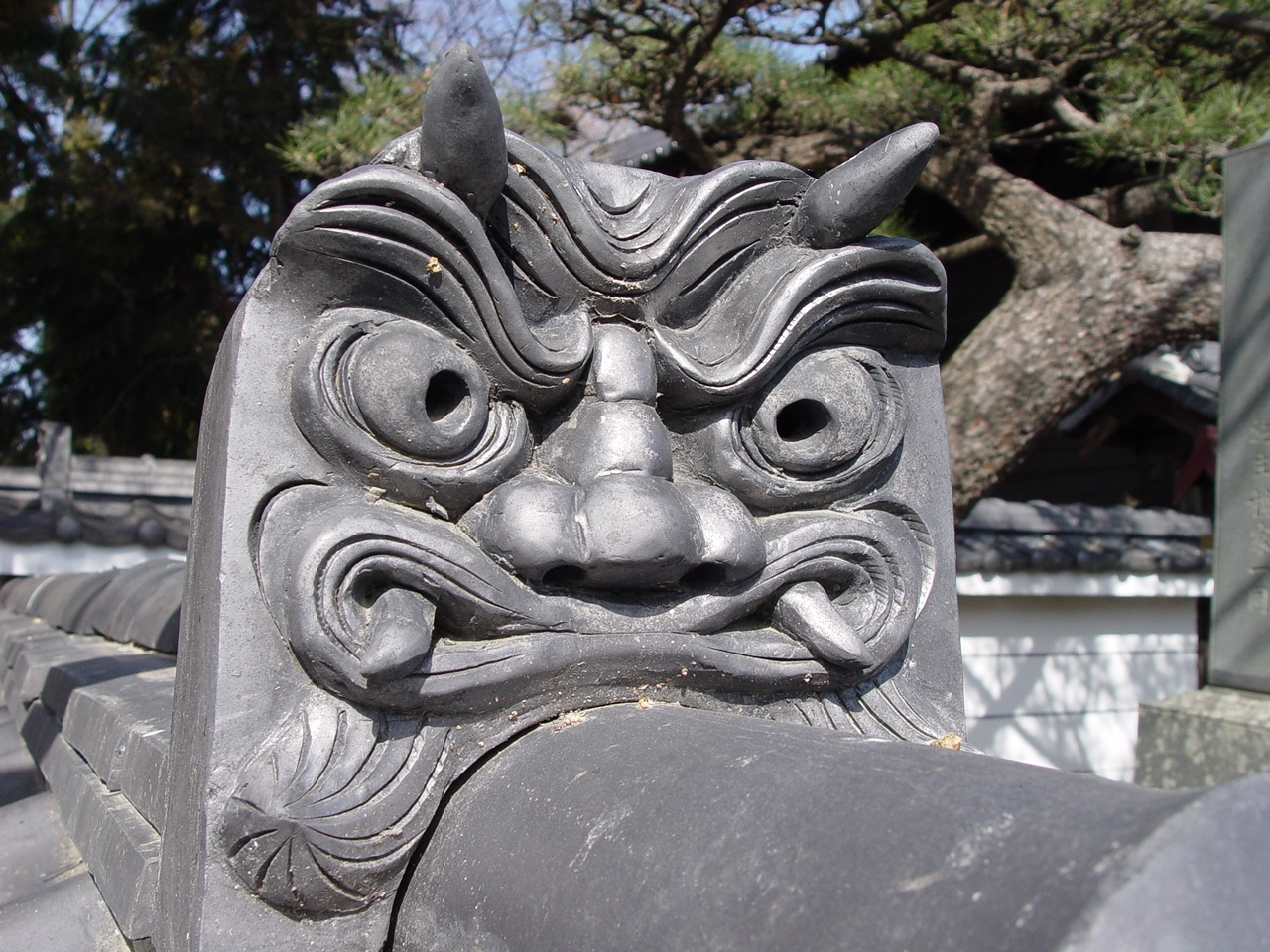
Devil Head Tile

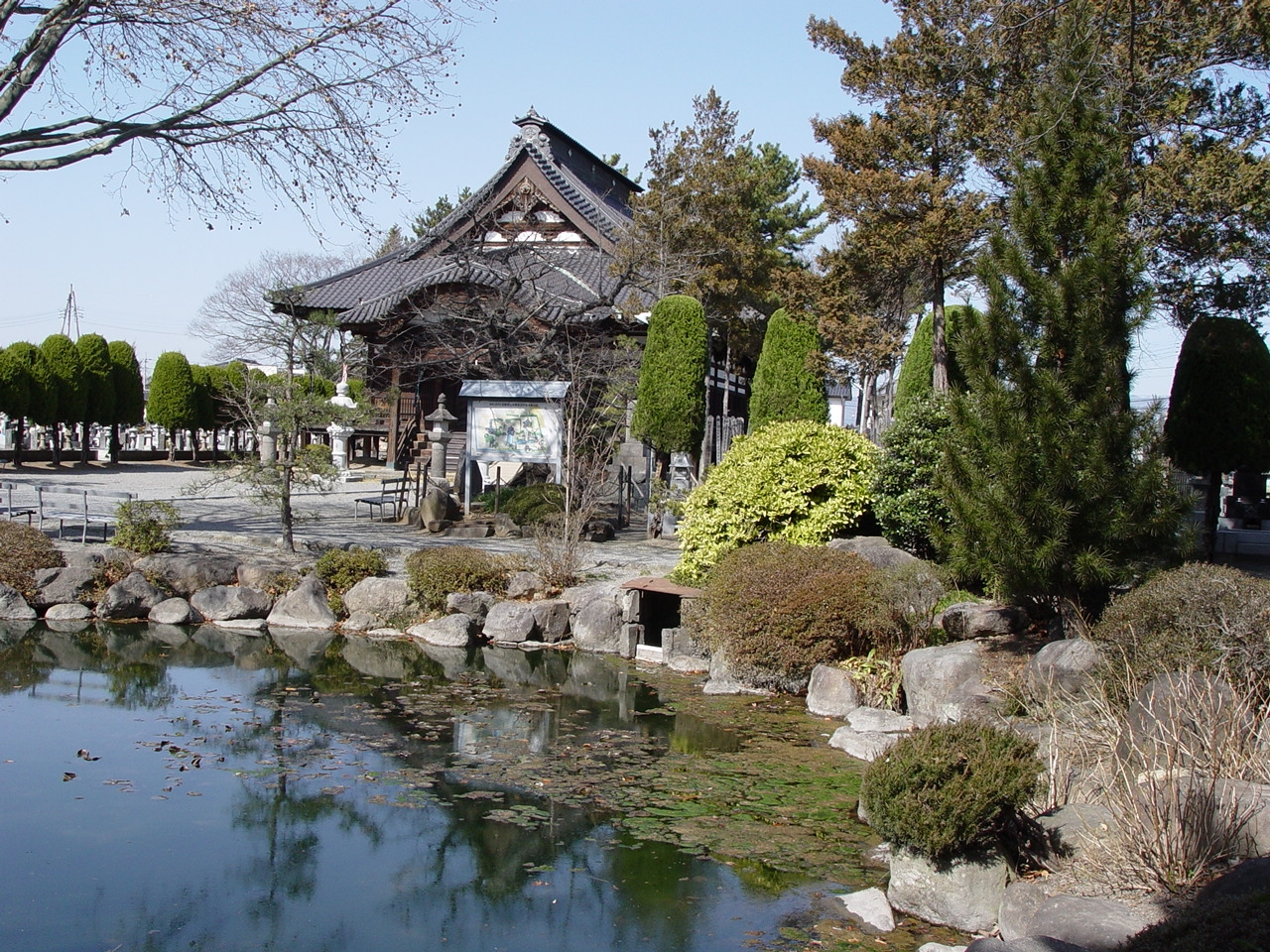
Pond

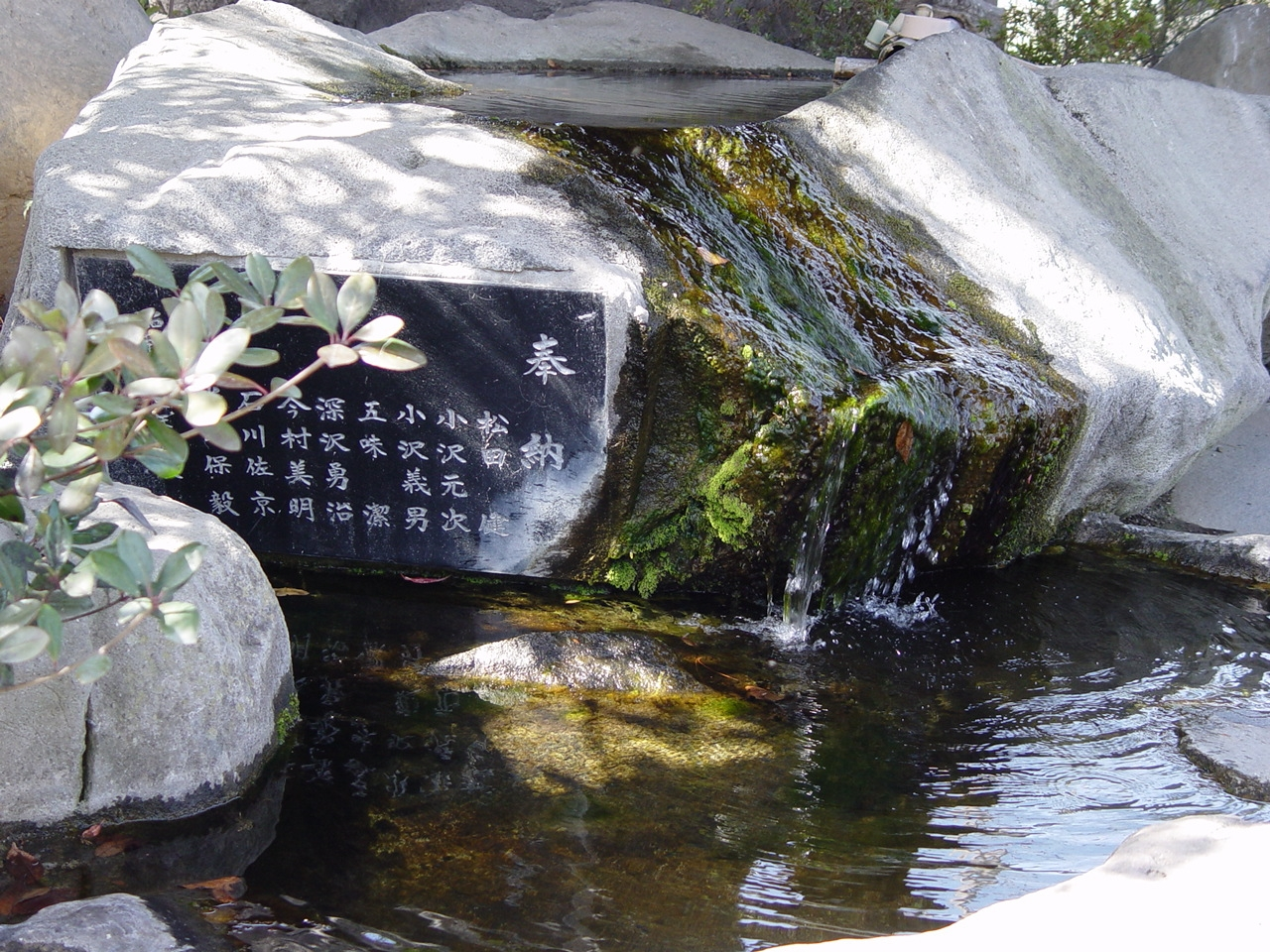
Another view of the pond

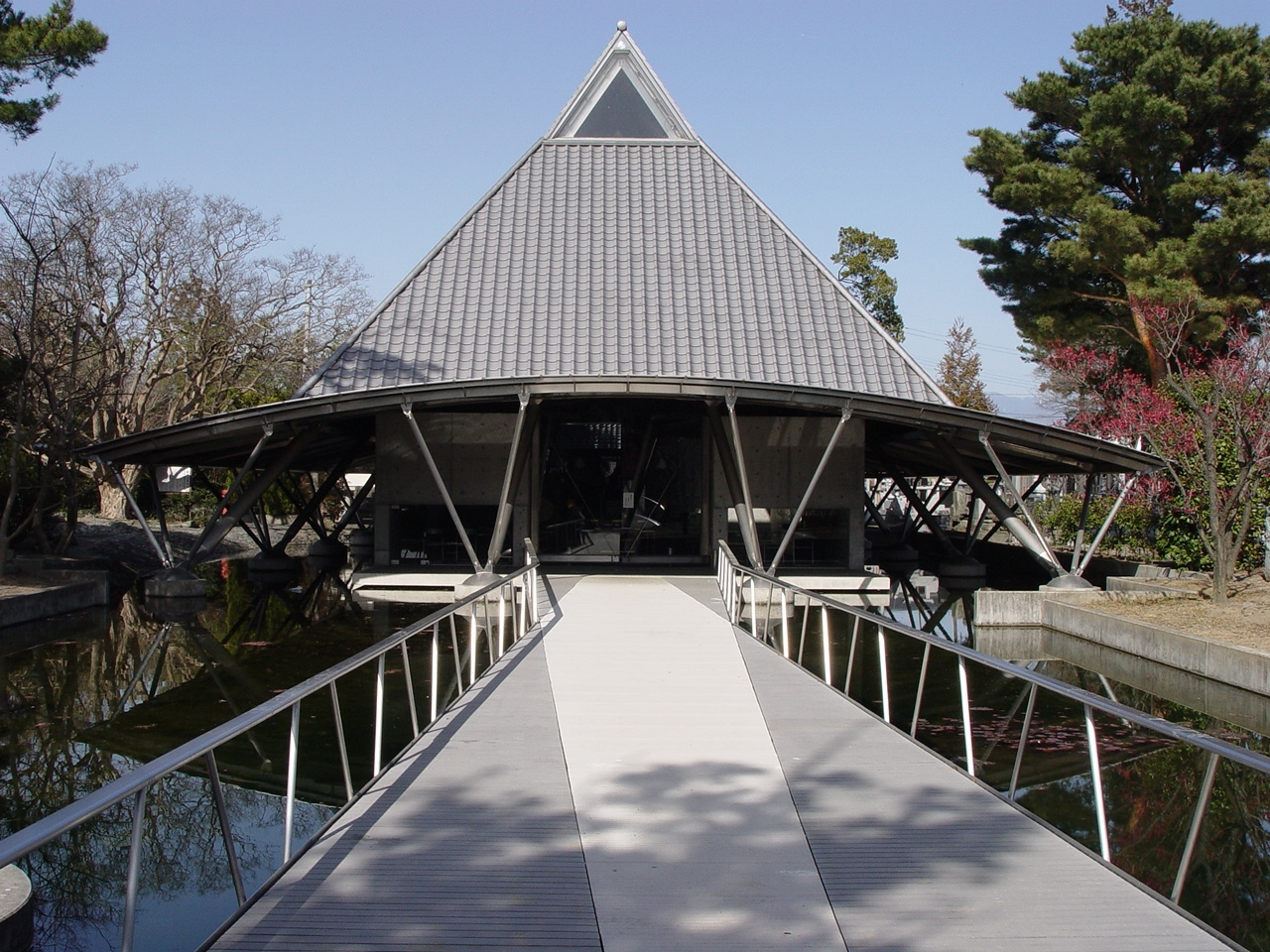
Modern temple building

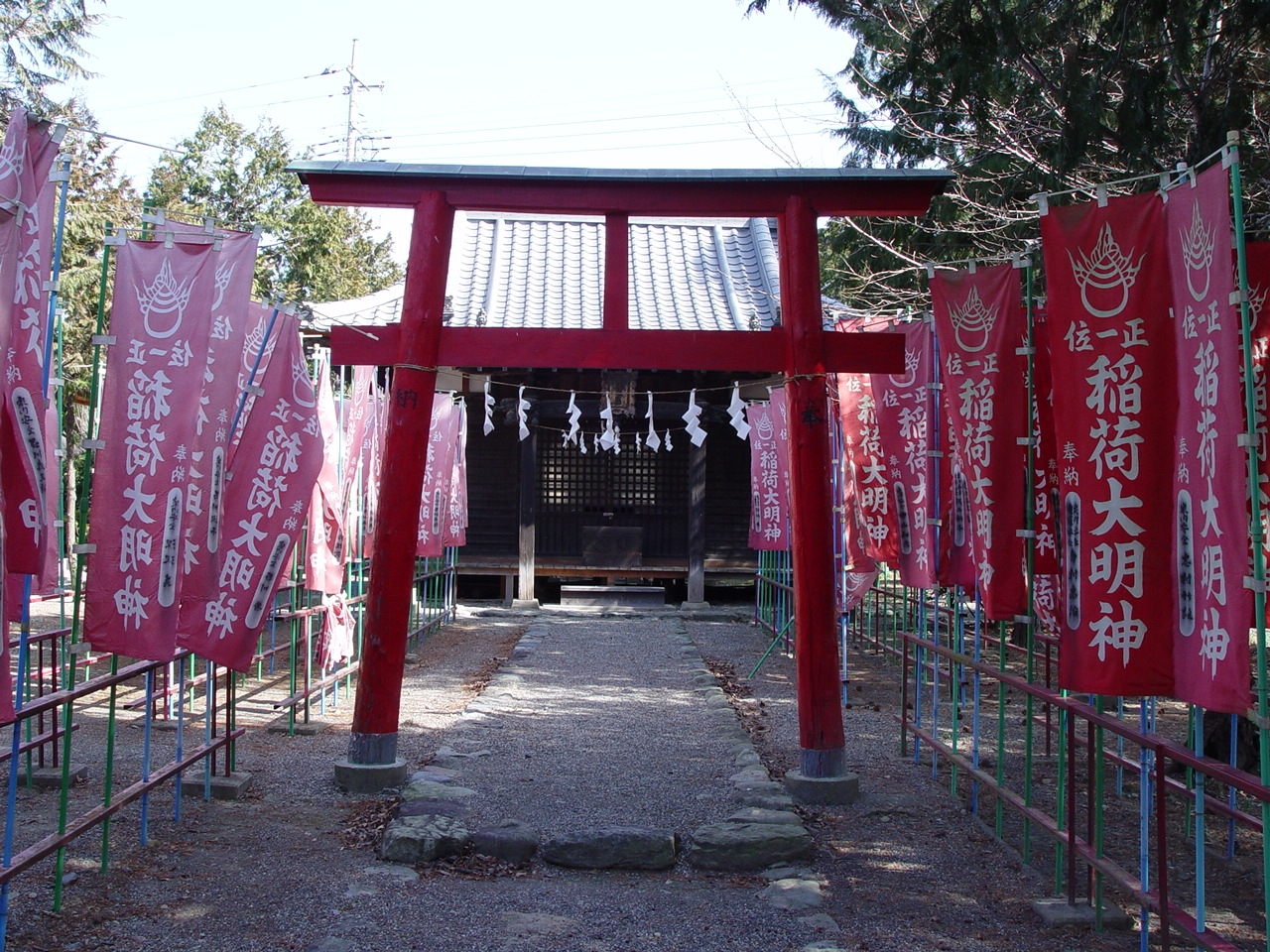
Shinto Shrine on temple grounds
