= Minami-Alps, Yamanashi =

Minami-Alps 南アルプス市
- City
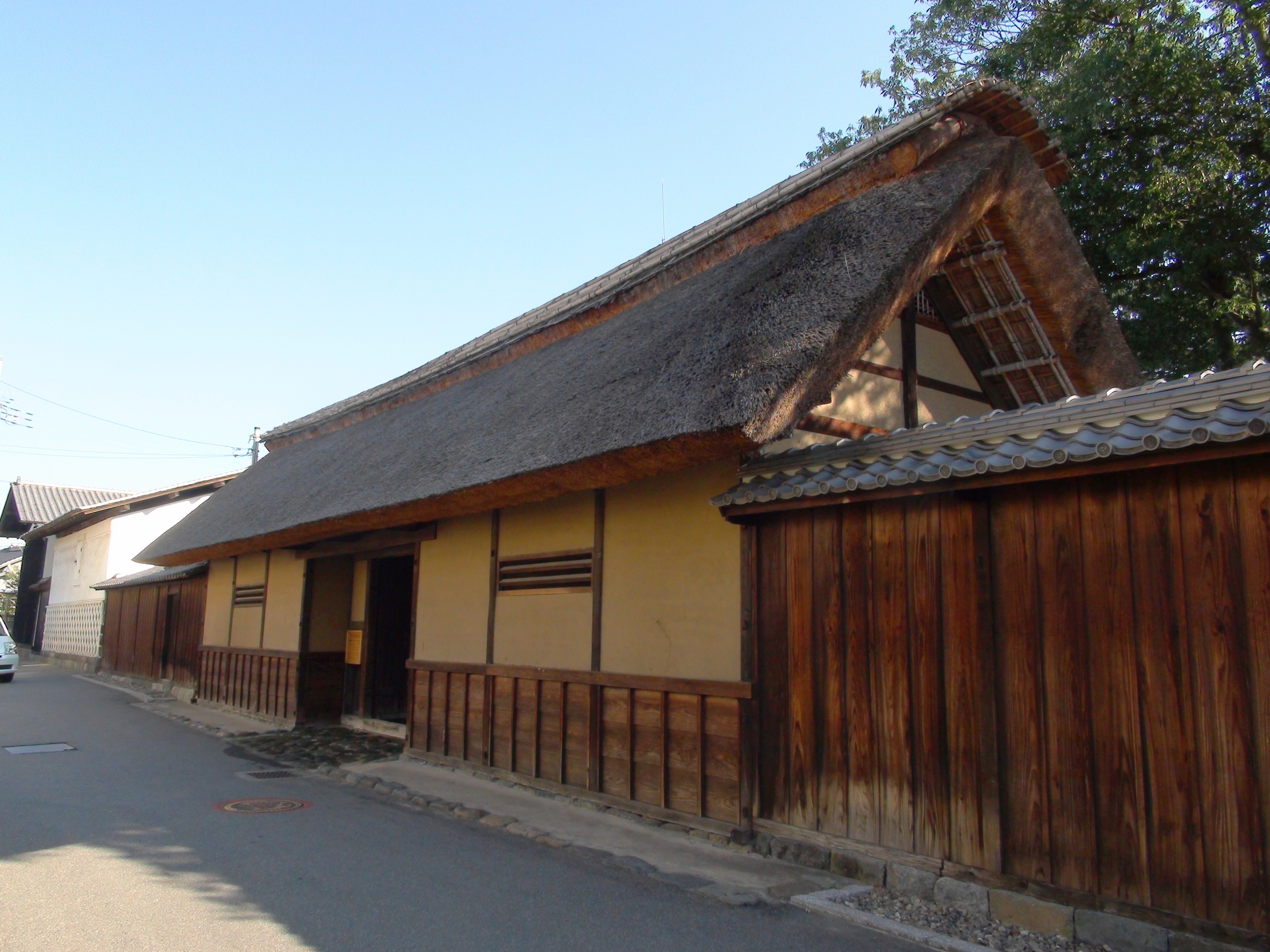
- Gate of the Ando house in Minami-Alps City

- Flag Seal

- Location of Minami-Alps in Yamanashi Prefecture

- Coordinates: 35°36′29.9″N 138°27′54.1″E
- Country: Japan
- Region: Chūbu (Tōkai)
- Prefecture: Yamanashi

Government
  - Mayor: Kazumoto Kanemaru (since 2015)

Area
  - Total: 264.14 km^{2} (101.99 sq mi)

Population (October 1, 2020)
  - Total: 69,459
  - Density: 262.96/km^{2} (681.07/sq mi)
- Time zone: UTC+9 (Japan Standard Time)
- Phone number: 055-282-1111
- Address: Ogasawara 376, Minami-Alps city, Yamanashi 400-0395
- Website: Official website

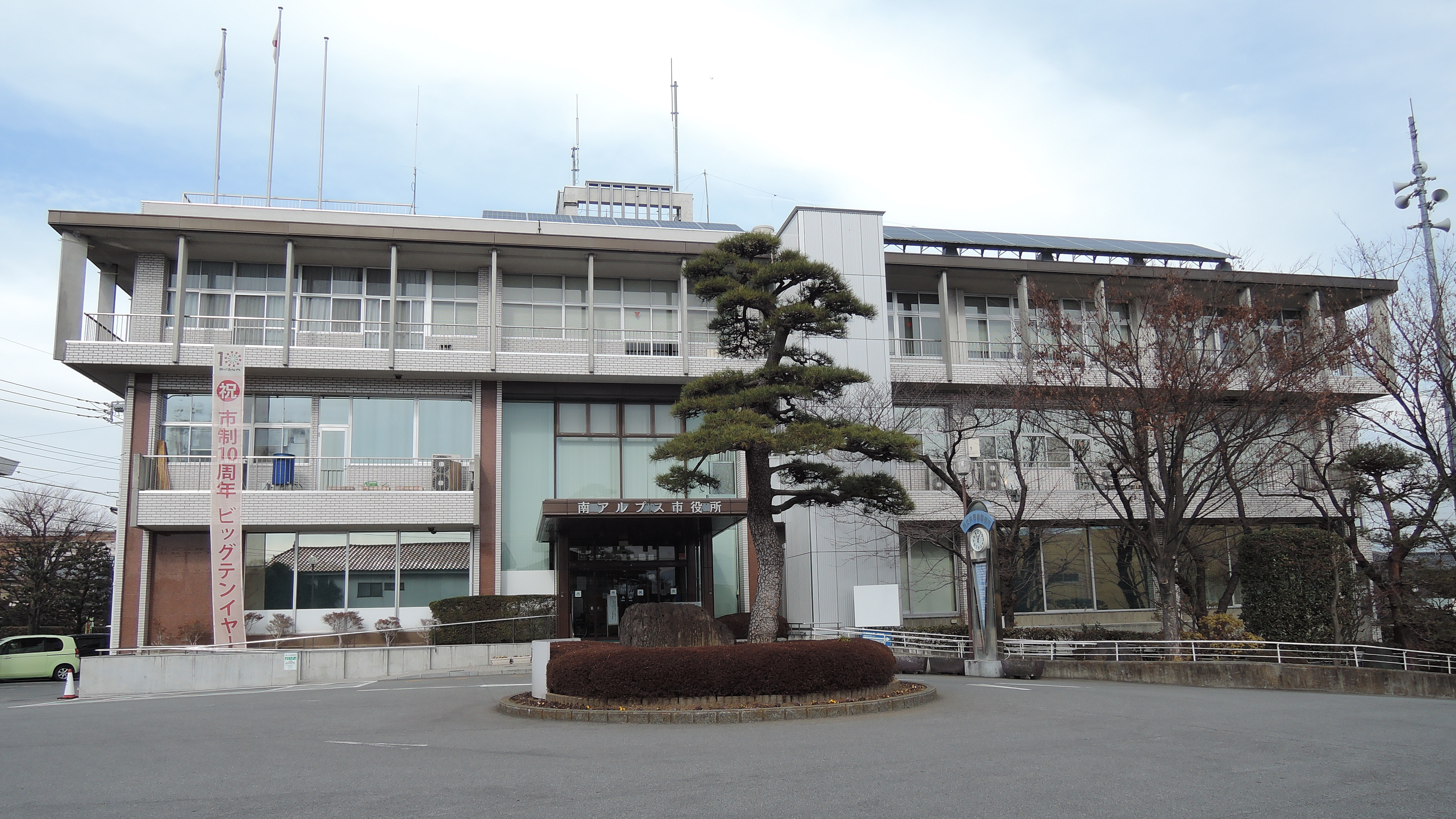
Minami-Alps City Hall

Minami-Alps (Japanese: 南アルプス市, Hepburn: Minami-Arupusu-shi) is a city located in Yamanashi Prefecture, Japan. As of 1 June 2019, the city has an estimated population of 71,618 in 27,956 households, and a population density of 270 persons per km^{2}. The total area of the city is 264.14 square kilometres (101.99 sq mi). Minami-Alps is Yamanashi Prefecture's third largest city. The city's name was chosen in September 2002 from among entries submitted by the general public.

== Geography ==
The city is named for its location on the eastern foothills of the "Southern Alps". This mountain range includes Mount Kita, Japan's second-highest mountain, as well as a number of other mountains that top 3,000 meters. The urbanized zones lie along the three rivers running along these mountains: Midai River, Takizawa River, and Tsubo River. The area is noted for growing fruit, especially: cherries, peaches, plums, grapes, pears, persimmons, kiwi, and apples.

=== Surrounding municipalities ===
- Nagano Prefecture
  - Ina
- Shizuoka Prefecture
  - Aoi-ku, Shizuoka
- Yamanashi Prefecture
  - Chūō
  - Fujikawa
  - Hayakawa
  - Hokuto
  - Ichikawamisato
  - Kai
  - Nirasaki
  - Shōwa

=== Climate ===
The city has a climate characterized by hot and humid summers, and relatively mild winters (Köppen climate classification Cfa). The average annual temperature in Minami-Alps is 10.3 °C. The average annual rainfall is 1539 mm with September as the wettest month.

== Demographics ==
Per Japanese census data, the population of Minami-Alps has recently plateaued after several decades of growth.

Historical population
Year	Pop.	±%
1940	52,148	—
1950	63,073	+20.9%
1960	53,924	−14.5%
1970	51,318	−4.8%
1980	54,123	+5.5%
1990	62,351	+15.2%
2000	70,116	+12.5%
2010	72,635	+3.6%
2020	69,459	−4.4%

== History ==
The city of Minami-Alps was established on April 1, 2003, by the merger of the towns of Kōsai, Kushigata, Shirane and Wakakusa, and the villages of Ashiyasu and Hatta (all from Nakakoma District).

== Government ==
Minami-Alps has a mayor-council form of government with a directly elected mayor and a unicameral city legislature of 22 members.

== Economy ==
The economy of Minami-Alps is primarily agricultural, with seasonal tourism and forestry playing secondary roles.

== Education ==
- Minami-Alps has 15 public elementary schools, one combined public elementary/middle school and six public middle schools operated by the city government. The city has two public high schools and one special education school operated by the Yamanashi Prefectural Board of Education.
- International schools - Alps Gakuen (former Colégio Pitágoras) - Brazilian school

== Transportation ==
=== Railway ===
- Minami-Alps is the only city in Yamanashi which does not have any passenger railway services.

=== Highway ===
- Chūbu-Ōdan Expressway
- National Route 52
- National Route 140

== Sister cities ==
- Anamizu, Ishikawa, Japan
- Marshalltown, Iowa, United States
- Ogasawara, Tokyo, Japan
- Tsubetsu, Hokkaido, Japan
- Queanbeyan, New South Wales, Australia
- Winterset, Iowa, United States

=== Friendship city ===
- Dujiangyan City, China

== Notable people from Minami-Alps ==
- Kaori Chiba, women's field hockey player
- Shin Kanemaru, politician
- Masae Kasai, women's volleyball player
- Tachū Naitō, architect, engineer
- Akira Takabe, professional football player

== See also ==
- Hōzen-ji
- Minami-Alps Biosphere Reserve
- Minami Alps National Park
