= Thomas of Corbridge =

Archbishop of York from 1299 to 1304

- Archbishop of York
- Elected: 12 November 1299
- Term ended: 22 September 1304
- Predecessor: Henry of Newark
- Successor: William Greenfield
- Other post: Chancellor of York

Orders
- Consecration: 28 February 1300 by Boniface VIII

Personal details
- Died: 22 September 1304 Laneham, Nottinghamshire
- Buried: Southwell Minster

Thomas of Corbridge (sometimes Thomas Corbridge; died 1304) was Archbishop of York between 1299 and 1304.

== Life ==
Some sources state that Thomas' grandfather was the master-carpenter in charge of building the transepts of York Minster, others state that nothing is known of his ancestry. He probably came from Corbridge, Northumberland. He was a canon of York before 11 September 1277 and held the prebend of Osbaldwick. He was a Doctor of Theology, probably from Oxford University. He was appointed Chancellor of York by 17 February 1280, but resigned the office on 16 June 1290 when he was appointed to the chapel of St Mary and Holy Angels, but was obstructed from that office. He then attempted to resume the office of chancellor, but the office had already been assigned to another priest and he was excommunicated by Archbishop John le Romeyn of York on 31 July 1290. Eventually he gained control of the chapel and the excommunication was lifted on 24 March 1291.

Thomas was elected archbishop of York on 12 November 1299. Traveling to Rome for confirmation and the pallium, his election was set aside by Pope Boniface VIII who promptly provided him to the see and consecrated Thomas himself on 28 February 1300. Thomas was given the temporalities of the see on 30 April 1300.

The archbishop died on 22 September 1304 at Laneham in Nottinghamshire. He died right after having been admonished and punished by King Edward I of England, because the archbishop had not put the king's nominee into a clerical post for which there was also a papal nominee. Walter of Guisborough, the chronicler, felt that the king's treatment of the archbishop so scared the archbishop that Thomas fell sick and died as a result. During the four and a half years that Thomas was archbishop, he never left his diocese except for parliaments because he was so busy visiting his diocese. Thomas was buried in Southwell Minster.

== Citations ==
Catholic Church titles
Preceded by Henry of Newark	Archbishop of York; 1299–1304	Succeeded by See vacant for two years, then William Greenfield
