= Henry of Newark =

Archbishop of York from 1296 to 1299

- Archbishop of York
- Elected: 7 May 1296
- Term ended: 15 August 1299
- Predecessor: John le Romeyn
- Successor: Thomas of Corbridge
- Other posts: Archdeacon of Richmond; Dean of York

Orders
- Consecration: 15 June 1298

Personal details
- Died: 15 August 1299 York
- Buried: York Minster

Henry of Newark (died 15 August 1299) was a medieval Archbishop of York.

== Life ==
Nothing is known of Henry's ancestry, but he probably took his name from Newark-on-Trent in Nottinghamshire, where he owned some property. He wrote in 1298 that he had been brought up in the Gilbertine order of monks, but where exactly is unclear. Likewise, where he was educated is unknown. However, he was a master at Oxford University by 1270. He was also a royal clerk for King Edward I of England, and was sent on many diplomatic missions for the king, including missions to France, Gueldres, and Flanders.

Henry was canon of Hereford by 22 February 1273 and was named archdeacon of Richmond on 28 April 1279. He served Archbishop William de Wickwane of York as a clerk from about 1280, and served Wickwane's successor John le Romeyn as well. He was in office as dean of York on 27 February 1290. He also held the prebends of Holme, Strensall and Weighton in Yorkshire. He was also canon of Buckland Dinan between 30 January and 2 February 1293 and also prebend of London by 28 September 1294 and a canon of Southwell.

Henry was elected Archbishop of York on 7 May 1296, but failed to go to Pope Boniface VIII and was consequently deprived of office. However, Boniface reinstated Henry to please King Edward I and Henry was consecrated 15 June 1298. In 1297, Henry led the clergy of his diocese in approving King Edward's request for a tax on clerical incomes, in contrast to the behaviour of the bishops of the south, who led by Robert Winchelsey had refused to pay the tax.

Henry died 15 August 1299 at York and was buried in York Minster.

== Citations ==
Catholic Church titles
Preceded by John le Romeyn	Archbishop of York; 1296–1299	Succeeded by Thomas of Corbridge
