= Simon Langton =

Simon Langton may refer to:

- Simon Langton (priest) (died 1248), English medieval clergyman
- Simon Langton (television director) (born 1941), English television director and producer

== See also ==
- Simon Langton Grammar School for Boys
- Simon Langton Girls' Grammar School
