= Godfrey Ludham =

Archbishop of York from 1258 to 1265

- Archbishop of York
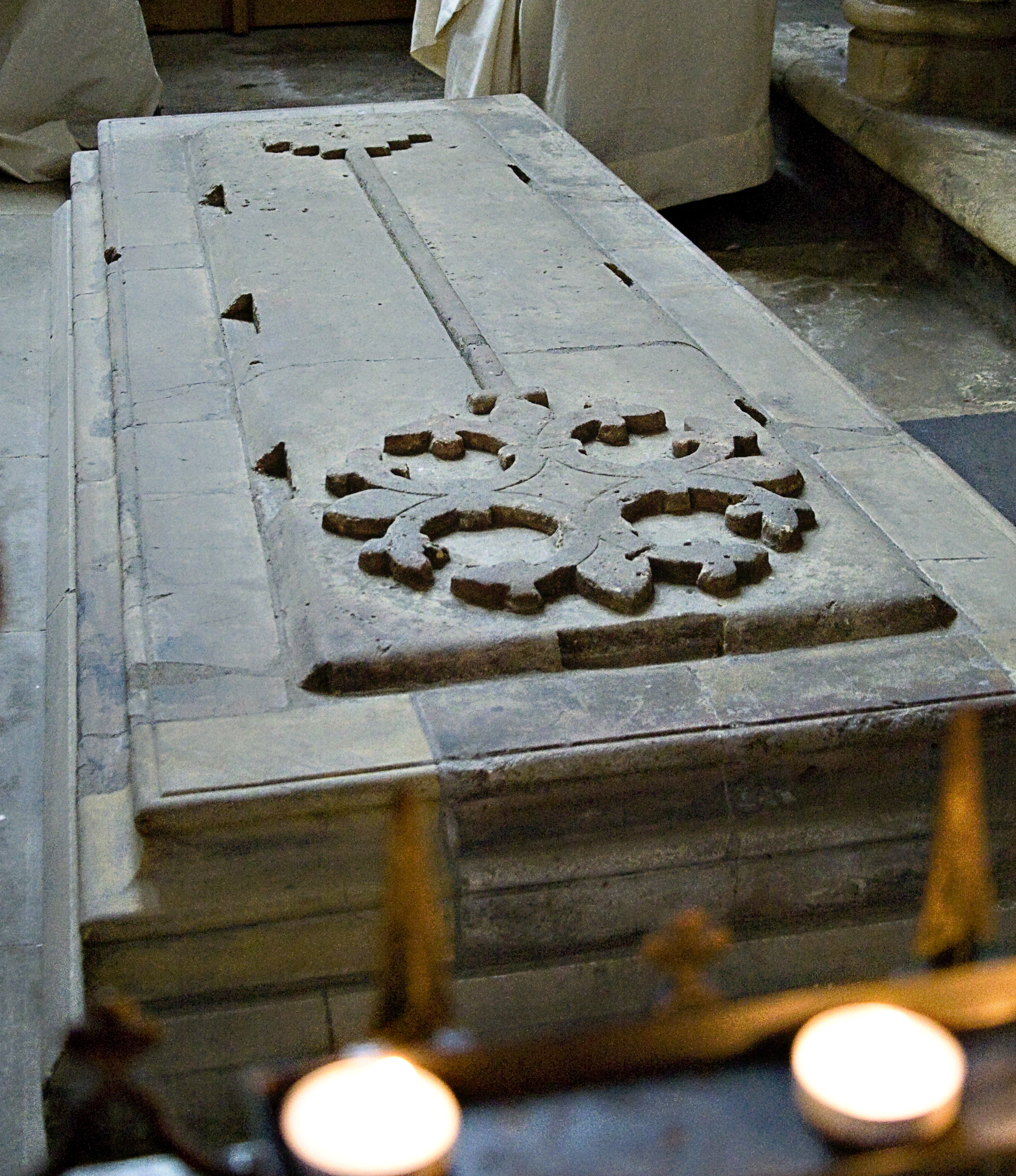
- Tomb of Ludham in York Minster
- Elected: c. 25 July 1258
- Term ended: 12 January 1265
- Predecessor: Sewal de Bovil
- Successor: Walter Giffard
- Other post: Dean of York

Orders
- Consecration: 22 September 1258 by Pope Alexander IV

Personal details
- Died: 12 January 1265
- Buried: York Minster
- Parents: Richard; Eda

Godfrey Ludham (Note: Or Godfrey de Ludham or Godfrey Kineton) (died 1265) was Archbishop of York from 1258 to 1265.

== Life ==
Ludham's parents were Richard and Eda of Ludham, Norfolk, and he had a brother Thomas who was also a priest. Matthew Paris gives him the name Godfrey Kineton, but without any explanation of why that was his name. He attended a university, for he bore the title of magister but the exact university is unknown.

Ludham was a clerk of Archbishop Walter de Gray before 17 June 1226 and was the rector of the moiety of Pengston by 26 August 1228. He was named Precentor of York by September 1249, and may have held that office by 1244.

Ludham served as Dean of York from 1256 to 1258 before being elected as Archbishop of York about 25 July 1258. He was consecrated on 22 September 1258 by Pope Alexander IV at Viterbo. His brother Thomas was papal chaplain, and held prebends at York Minster and Southwell Minster. He was enthroned at York Minster sometime around Christmas of 1258.

While archbishop, Ludham visited monasteries and issued a set of synodal decrees for York, which were issued in 1259. He excommunicated the monks of Beverley because they had intruded into archiepiscopal property. In 1261, he put an interdict on the city of York for unspecified offences against the cathedral chapter and himself. Unfortunately, no register of his acts survives, so no detailed study of his time as archbishop is possible. He, however, does not seem to have played any part in the political life of the kingdom.

In 1191 John, Count of Mortain, (later King John of England) had granted the church of Walesby and its chapelry of Haughton to the church of St Mary, Rouen, and in 1257, Ludham confirmed Rouen's authority to present Walesby's vicar, and specified among his dues and duties the chapel of Hockton with its tithes, and the joint funding with Rouen of repairs, rebuilding, books, vestments and other alterages.

Ludham died on 12 January 1265, and was buried in the south transept of York Minster. In 1968, his tomb was opened and studied because of construction work in the cathedral, and his body had evidently been embalmed. A mitre was on his head, and he had his pallium as well as a crozier and silver chalice and paten.

== Citations ==
Catholic Church titles
Preceded by Sewal de Bovil	Archbishop of York; 1258–1265	Succeeded by William Langton
