= Archbishop of York =

Senior bishop in the Church of England

- Archbishopric

anglican
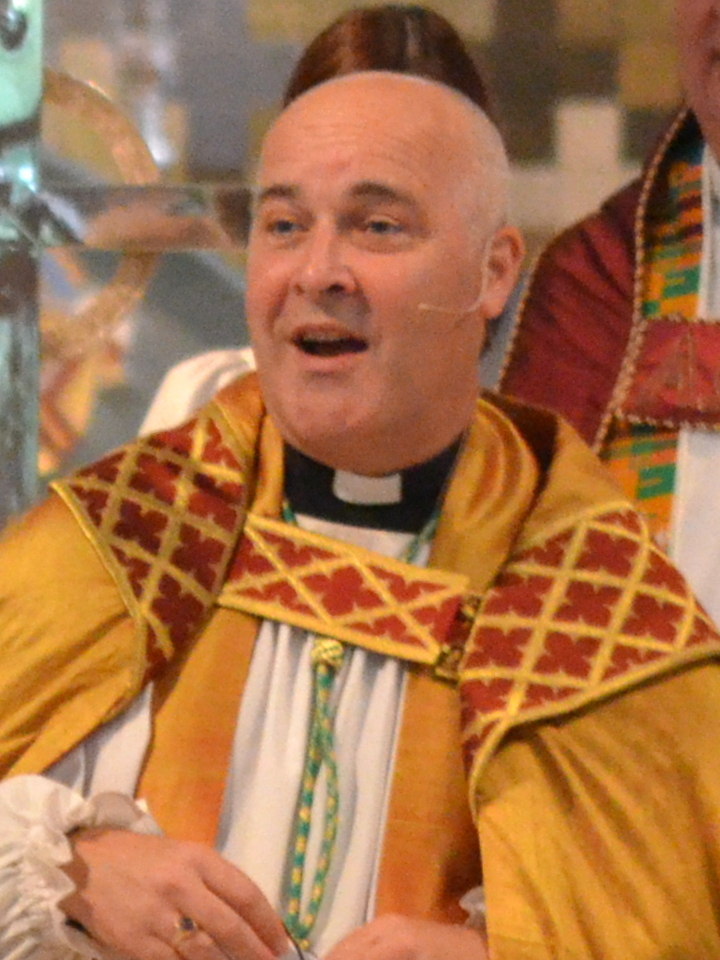

- Arms of the Diocese of York: Gules, two keys in saltire the wards upwards argent in chief a regal crown proper
- Incumbent; Stephen Cottrell since 9 July 2020
- Style: The Most Reverend and Right Honourable (otherwise His Grace)

Location
- Ecclesiastical province: York
- Residence: Bishopthorpe Palace

Information
- First holder: Paulinus of York
- Established: Bishopric in 626; Archbishopric in 735
- Diocese: York
- Cathedral: York Minster

Website
- archbishopofyork.org

The archbishop of York is a senior bishop in the Church of England, second only to the archbishop of Canterbury. The archbishop is the diocesan bishop of the Diocese of York and the metropolitan bishop of the province of York, which covers the northern regions of England (north of the Trent) as well as the Isle of Man.

The archbishop's throne (cathedra) is in York Minster in central York, and the official residence is Bishopthorpe Palace in the village of Bishopthorpe outside York. The current archbishop is Stephen Cottrell, since the confirmation of his election on 9 July 2020.

== History ==
=== Roman ===
There was a bishop in Eboracum (Roman York) from very early times; during the Middle Ages, it was thought to have been one of the dioceses established by the legendary King Lucius. Bishops of York are known to have been present at the councils of Arles (Eborius) and Nicaea (unnamed). However, this early Christian community was later destroyed by the pagan Anglo-Saxons and there is no direct succession from these bishops to the post-Augustinian ones.

=== Middle Ages ===
The Catholic diocese was refounded by Paulinus (a member of Augustine's mission) in the 7th century. Notable among these early bishops is Wilfrid. These early bishops of York acted as diocesan rather than archdiocesan prelates until the time of Ecgbert of York, (Note: Paulinus was appointed archbishop of York by Pope Honorius I in 634, but the appointment was not effective since it occurred after Paulinus had fled from York and become bishop of Rochester.) who received the pallium from Pope Gregory III in 735 and established metropolitan rights in the north. Until the Danish invasion the archbishops of Canterbury occasionally exercised authority, and it was not until the Norman Conquest that the archbishops of York asserted their complete independence.

At the time of the Norman invasion York had jurisdiction over Worcester, Lichfield, and Lincoln, as well as claiming the dioceses in the Northern Isles and Scotland which were in fact independent. But the first three sees just mentioned were taken from York in 1072. In 1154 the suffragan sees of the Isle of Man and Orkney were transferred to the Norwegian archbishop of Nidaros (today's Trondheim), and in 1188 York finally accepted it had no authority over all of the Scottish dioceses except Whithorn, so that only the dioceses of Whithorn, Durham, and Carlisle remained to the archbishops as suffragan sees. Of these, Durham was practically independent, for the palatine bishops of that see were little short of sovereigns in their own jurisdiction. Sodor and Man were returned to York during the 14th century, to compensate for the loss of Whithorn to the Scottish Church.

Several of the archbishops of York held the ministerial office of Lord Chancellor of England and played some parts in affairs of state. As Peter Heylyn (1600–1662) wrote: "This see has yielded to the Church eight saints, to the Church of Rome three cardinals, to the realm of England twelve Lord Chancellors and two Lord Treasurers, and to the north of England two Lord Presidents." The bishopric's role was also complicated by continued conflict over primacy with the see of Canterbury.

=== English Reformation ===
At the time of the English Reformation, York possessed three suffragan sees, Durham, Carlisle, and Sodor and Man, to which during the brief space of Queen Mary I's reign (1553–1558) may be added the Diocese of Chester, founded by Henry VIII, but subsequently recognised by the Pope.

Until the mid 1530s (and from 1553 to 1558) the bishops and archbishops were Catholics in communion with the pope in Rome. This is no longer the case, as the archbishop of York, together with the rest of the Church of England, is a member of the Anglican Communion.

Walter de Grey purchased York Place as his London residence, which after the fall of Cardinal Thomas Wolsey, was renamed the Palace of Whitehall.

== Styles and privileges ==
The archbishop of York is an ex officio member of the House of Lords and is styled Primate of England (whereas the archbishop of Canterbury is the Primate of All England). He is referred to as "The Most Reverend"; retired archbishops are styled as "The Right Reverend". As archbishops are, by convention, appointed to the Privy Council, they may, therefore, also use the style of "The Right Honourable" for life (unless they are later removed from the council). In debates in the House of Lords, the archbishop is referred to as "The Most Reverend Primate, the archbishop of York"; "The Right Honourable" is not used in this instance. He may also be formally addressed as "Your Grace".

The surname of the archbishop of York is not always used in formal documents; often, only the first name and see are mentioned. The archbishop is legally entitled to sign his name as "Ebor:" (from the Latin Eboracum meaning "of York"). The right to use a title as a legal signature is permitted to only bishops, peers of the realm and peers by courtesy. The current archbishop of York usually signs as "+Stephen Ebor:".

In the English and Welsh order of precedence, the archbishop of York is ranked above all individuals in the realm, with the exception of the sovereign and members of the royal family, the archbishop of Canterbury and the lord chancellor. Immediately below him is the prime minister and then the lord president of the council.

== Present ==
The archbishop of York is the metropolitan bishop of the province of York and is the junior of the two archbishops of the Church of England after the archbishop of Canterbury. The see is currently occupied by Stephen Cottrell since 9 July 2020.

The Province of York includes 10 Anglican dioceses in Northern England: Blackburn, Carlisle, Chester, Durham, Liverpool, Manchester, Newcastle, Sheffield, Leeds, and York, as well as 2 other dioceses: Southwell and Nottingham in the Midlands and Sodor and Man covering the Isle of Man.

== List of archbishops ==
=== Pre-Conquest ===
Bishops of York
From	Until	Incumbent	Notes
625	633	Paulinus	Formerly a monk at St. Andrew's Monastery in Rome; translated to Rochester; canonised.
633	664	See vacant	
664	669	Chad	Resigned the see of York; later became bishop of Mercia and Lindsey; canonised.
664	678	Wilfrid (I)	Ejected from York; later became bishop of Selsey (Note: Although Wilfrid established a monastic community in Selsey, there are no early sources that describe him as bishop of the South Saxons. Wilfrid is credited with being first bishop of the South Saxons, by William of Malmesbury and Florence of Worcester, also on some later Ecclesiastical lists, but he was still technically bishop of York when in charge of Selsey Abbey. Therefore, as Sussex had been annexed by Wessex then Selsey probably would have been subject to the Diocese of the West Saxons, when Wilfrid was there.)canonised.
678	706	Bosa	Canonised.
706	714	John of Beverley	Translated from Hexham; resigned the see; canonised in 1037.
714	732	Wilfrid II	Resigned the see; canonised.
c. 732	735	Ecgbert	York elevated to archbishopric in 735.
Pre-Conquest archbishops of York
From	Until	Incumbent	Notes
735	766	Ecgbert	York elevated to archbishopric in 735.
c. 767	c. 780	Æthelbert	Also known as Æthelbeorht, Adalberht, Ælberht, Aelberht, Aldbert or Æthelbert.
c. 780	796	Eanbald (I)	
796	c. 808	Eanbald (II)	
c. 808	c. 834	Wulfsige	
837	854	Wigmund	
854	c. 896	Wulfhere	Fled the Danes in 872, returned in 873.
900	c. 916	Æthelbald	Sometimes known as Æthelbeald, Athelbald, or Ethelbald.
c. 916	931	Hrotheweard	Sometimes known as Lodeward.
931	956	Wulfstan (I)	
c. 958	971	Oscytel	Also known as Oscytel. Translated from Dorchester.
971		Edwald	Also known as Edwaldus or Ethelwold.
971	992	Oswald	Held both the sees of York and Worcester; canonised.
995	1002	Ealdwulf	Held both the sees of York and Worcester.
1002	1023	Wulfstan (II)	Also known as Lupus. Also held the see of Worcester (1002–1016).
1023	1051	Ælfric Puttoc	Also held the see of Worcester (1040–1041).
1051	1060	Cynesige	Also known as Kynsige.
1061	1069	Ealdred	Also known as Aldred. Held the see of Worcester 1046–1061, of Hereford 1056–1060, and of York 1061–1069.
Footnote(s): (Note: The second edition of the Handbook of British Chronology listed Æthelric to have been archbishop of York from 1041 to 1042, but in the third edition he is no longer listed to have been archbishop.) and Source(s):

=== Conquest to Reformation ===
Archbishops of York (Conquest to Reformation)
From	Until	Incumbent	Notes
1070	1100	Thomas of Bayeux	Also known as Thomas (I).
1100	1108	Gerard	Translated from Hereford.
1109	1114	Thomas (II)	
1119	1140	Thurstan	He was elected in 1114, but was not consecrated until 1119.
1140		Waltheof of Melrose	Nominated archbishop, but was quashed by King Stephen; later became Abbot of Melrose.
1140		Henry de Sully	Abbot of Fécamp Abbey. Nominated archbishop, but was quashed by Pope Innocent II.
1143	1147	William (FitzHerbert)	Deposed by Pope Eugene III; canonised in 1226.
1147		Hilary of Chichester	Deposed by Pope Eugene III, elected bishop of Chichester.
1147	1153	Henry Murdac	Formerly Abbot of Fountains Abbey.
1153	1154	William (FitzHerbert) (again)	Restored by Pope Anastasius IV; canonised in 1226.
1154	1181	Roger de Pont L'Évêque	Formerly archdeacon of Canterbury.
1191	1212	Geoffrey (Plantagenet)	Formerly bishop-elect of Lincoln; elected archbishop in 1189, but was only consecrated in 1191.
1215		Simon Langton	Elected archbishop of York in June 1215, but was quashed on 20 August 1215 by Pope Innocent III on request from King John; later became archdeacon of Canterbury.
1216	1255	Walter de Gray	Translated from Worcester.
1256	1258	Sewal de Bovil	Formerly Dean of York.
1258	1265	Godfrey Ludham	Also known as Godfrey Kineton. Formerly Dean of York.
1265		William Langton	Dean of York (1262–1279); elected archbishop in March 1265, but was quashed in November 1265.
1265	1266	Bonaventure	Selected as archbishop in November 1265, but never consecrated and resigned the appointment in October 1266.
1266	1279	Walter Giffard	Translated from Bath and Wells.
1279	1285	William de Wickwane	
1286	1296	John le Romeyn	Also known as John Romanus.
1298	1299	Henry of Newark	Formerly Dean of York.
1300	1304	Thomas of Corbridge	
1306	1315	William Greenfield	Formerly Dean of Chichester
1317	1340	William Melton	
1342	1352	William Zouche	Also known as William de la Zouche.
1353	1373	Cardinal John of Thoresby	Translated from Worcester; created a Cardinal in 1361.
1374	1388	Alexander Neville	Translated to St Andrews in 1388.
1388	1396	Thomas Arundel	Translated from Ely; afterwards translated to Canterbury.
1397	1398	Robert Waldby	Translated from Chichester.
1398		Walter Skirlaw	Bishop of Durham, elected but put aside by King Richard II.
1398	1405	Richard le Scrope	Translated from Lichfield.
1405	1406	Thomas Langley	Elected archbishop in August 1405, but was quashed in May 1406.
1406	1407	Robert Hallam	Nominated archbishop in May 1406 by Pope Innocent VII, but was vetoed by King Henry IV.
1407	1423	Henry Bowet	Translated from Bath and Wells.
1423	1424	Philip Morgan	Elected archbishop in 1423, but was quashed in 1424.
1424	1425	Richard Fleming	Conferred as archbishop by Pope Martin V, but was refused by King Henry V, and Fleming resigned the appointment in July 1425.
1426	1452	Cardinal John Kemp	Translated from London; created a Cardinal in 1439; translated to Canterbury.
1452	1464	William Booth	Translated from Lichfield.
1465	1476	George Neville	Translated from Exeter.
1476	1480	Lawrence Booth	Translated from Durham.
1480	1500	Thomas Rotherham	Translated from Lincoln.
1501	1507	Thomas Savage	Translated from London.
1508	1514	Cardinal Christopher Bainbridge	Translated from Durham; created a Cardinal in 1511.
1514	1530	Cardinal Thomas Wolsey	Translated from Lincoln in 1514; created a Cardinal in 1515; held with Bath and Wells 1518–23, Durham 1523–29 and Winchester 1529–30.

=== Post-Reformation ===
Post-Reformation archbishops of York
From	Until	Incumbent	Notes
1531	1544	Edward Lee	Translated from St Davids.
1545	1554	Robert Holgate	Translated from Llandaff.
1555	1559	Nicholas Heath	Translated from Worcester.
1561	1568	Thomas Young	Translated from St Davids.
1570	1576	Edmund Grindal	Translated from London; afterwards translated to Canterbury.
1577	1588	Edwin Sandys	Translated from London.
1589	1594	John Piers	Translated from Salisbury.
1595	1606	Matthew Hutton	Translated from Durham.
1606	1628	Tobias Matthew	Translated from Durham.
1628		George Montaigne	Translated from Durham.
1629	1631	Samuel Harsnett	Translated from Norwich.
1632	1640	Richard Neile	Translated from Winchester.
1641	1646	John Williams	Translated from Lincoln. Deprived when the English episcopacy was abolished by Parliament. Died 1650.
1646	1660	The see was abolished during the Commonwealth and the Protectorate.	
1660	1664	Accepted Frewen	Translated from Lichfield.
1664	1683	Richard Sterne	Translated from Carlisle.
1683	1686	John Dolben	Translated from Rochester.
1688	1691	Thomas Lamplugh	Translated from Exeter.
1691	1714	John Sharp	Formerly Dean of Canterbury.
1714	1724	Sir William Dawes, Bt.	Translated from Chester.
1724	1743	Lancelot Blackburne	Translated from Exeter.
1743	1747	Thomas Herring	Translated from Bangor; afterwards translated to Canterbury.
1747	1757	Matthew Hutton	Translated from Bangor; afterwards translated to Canterbury.
1757	1761	John Gilbert	Translated from Salisbury.
1761	1776	Robert Hay Drummond	Translated from Salisbury.
1776	1807	William Markham	Translated from Chester.
1808	1847	Edward Venables-Vernon	Translated from Carlisle. Surname changed from Venables-Vernon to Venables-Vernon-Harcourt in 1831.
1847	1860	Thomas Musgrave	Translated from Hereford.
1860	1862	Charles Longley	Translated from Durham; afterwards translated to Canterbury.
1862	1890	William Thomson	Translated from Gloucester.
1891		William Connor Magee	Translated from Peterborough.
1891	1908 retired	William Maclagan	Translated from Lichfield.
1909	1928	Cosmo Gordon Lang	Translated from Stepney; afterwards translated to Canterbury.
1929	1942	William Temple	Translated from Manchester; afterwards translated to Canterbury.
1942	1955 retired	Cyril Garbett	Translated from Winchester.
1956	1961	Michael Ramsey	Translated from Durham; afterwards translated to Canterbury.
1961	1974	Donald Coggan	Translated from Bradford; afterwards translated to Canterbury.
1975	1983 retired	Stuart Blanch	Translated from Liverpool.
1983	1995 retired	John Habgood	Translated from Durham.
1995	2005 retired	David Hope	Translated from London.
2005	2020 retired	John Sentamu	Translated from Birmingham; retired 7 June 2020.
2020	present	Stephen Cottrell	Translated from Chelmsford; election confirmed 9 July 2020.

== Archbishops who became peers ==
From 1660 to 1900, all the archbishops of York died in office or were translated to Canterbury and died in that office.

William Maclagan was the first to voluntarily resign his office in 1908, two years before his death. All of his successors who were not translated to Canterbury have also resigned their office before death, and (like all archbishops of Canterbury) have been offered a peerage upon resignation. (Note: William Temple died in office (as the archbishop of Canterbury), and Cyril Garbett died before his hereditary peerage could be created.)

Archbishop	Title	Notes	
Cosmo Gordon Lang	Baron Lang of Lambeth in 1942	Extinct in 1945	as archbishop of Canterbury
Michael Ramsey	Baron Ramsey of Canterbury for life in 1974	Extinct in 1988	as archbishop of Canterbury
Donald Coggan	Baron Coggan for life in 1980	Extinct in 2000	as archbishop of Canterbury
Stuart Blanch	Baron Blanch for life in 1983	Extinct in 1994	
John Habgood	Baron Habgood for life in 1995	Retired from the House in 2011; extinct in 2019	
David Hope	Baron Hope of Thornes for life in 2005	Retired from the House in 2015; extant	
John Sentamu	Baron Sentamu for life in 2021	Extant	

== Assistant bishops ==
Among those who have served as assistant bishops of the diocese have been:

- 1929–1931 (res.): Bernard Heywood—overseeing the archdeaconry of the East Riding—former bishop of Southwell; became bishop suffragan of Hull (i.e., effectively the same role) and archdeacon of the East Riding
- 1964–1970 (ret.): Mervyn Armstrong, adviser on industry to the archbishop of York and former bishop of Jarrow
- 1969–1996 (d.): George Cockin, Rector of Bainton (until 1978) and former bishop of Owerri. George Eyles Irwin Cockin (15 August 1908 – 18 November 1996) was an Irish missionary in Nigeria. Educated at Repton and Leeds University, he was a Tutor at St Paul's College, Awka (1933–40) and then a Supervisor of Anglican Schools in East Nigeria (1940–52) before training for the ministry at Lincoln Theological College. He was made deacon in 1953, ordained priest in 1954 and served his title (curacy) in Kimberworth until 1955. He then returned to Nigeria as Senior Supervisor of Anglican Schools in East Nigeria until 1958; during which time he was also additionally made a Canon of All Saints Cathedral, Onitsha (Diocese on the Niger), 1957. He was elected the first bishop of Owerri in 1959 and served until his resignation in 1969. He was consecrated a bishop on 27 January 1959 by James Horstead, archbishop of West Africa and bishop of Sierra Leone.
- 1977–1994 (d.): Richard Wimbush, priest-in-charge of Etton with Dalton Holme (until 1983) and former bishop of Argyll and the Isles and Primus

== See also ==
- Accord of Winchester
