= Walter de Gray =

Archbishop of York (1215–1255) and Lord Chancellor of England (1205–1214)

- Archbishop of York
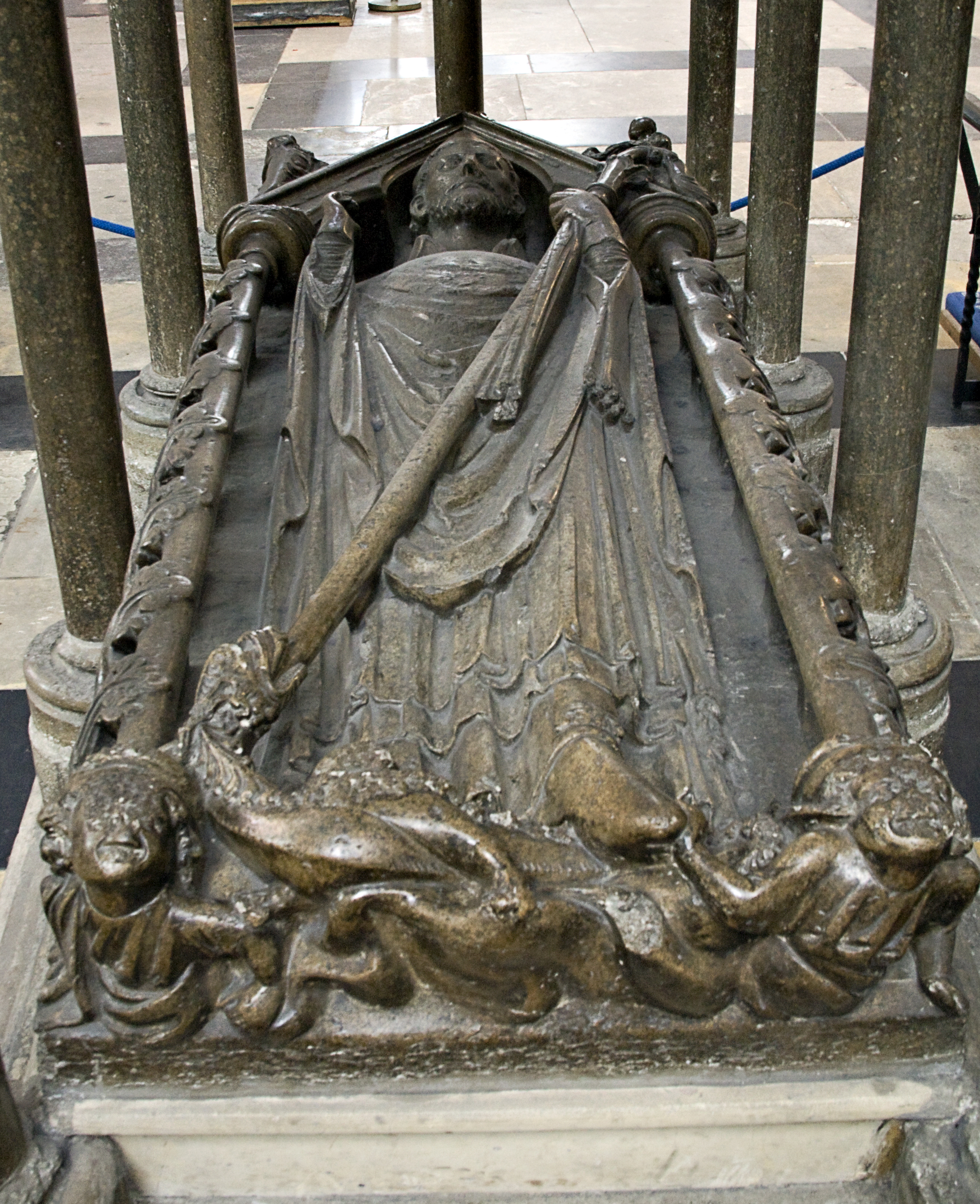
- Tomb of Archbishop de Gray in York Minster
- Elected: 10 November 1215
- Term ended: 1 May 1255
- Predecessor: Geoffrey Plantagenet
- Successor: Sewal de Bovil
- Other posts: Bishop of Lichfield; Bishop of Worcester

Orders
- Consecration: 5 October 1214

Personal details
- Born: Walter de Gray c. 1180 Eaton, Norwich, Norfolk
- Died: 1 May 1255 Fulham
- Buried: York Minster
- Parents: John de Gray

Lord Chancellor
- In office 1205–1214
- Monarch: John of England
- Preceded by: Hubert Walter
- Succeeded by: Richard Marsh

Walter de Gray (died 1 May 1255) was an English prelate and statesman who was Archbishop of York from 1215 to 1255 and Lord Chancellor from 1205 to 1214. His uncle was John de Gray, who was a bishop and royal servant to King John of England. After securing the office of chancellor, the younger Gray was a supporter of the king throughout his struggles and was present at the signing of Magna Carta in 1215. After two unsuccessful elections to a bishopric, he became Bishop of Worcester in 1214 but soon after moved to York. During the reign of John's son, King Henry III, Gray continued to serve the king while also being active in his archdiocese. He died in 1255 and was buried at York Minster, where his tomb still survives.

== Early life ==
Gray was the son of John de Gray, of Eaton in Norfolk and nephew of John de Gray, Bishop of Norwich. His birth year is not recorded, nor is his age when he died, but according to the historian Lee Wyatt, Gray was probably born around 1180. This assumes that in 1214 he was at least 30, the earliest legal age for consecration as a bishop, which would mean he was not born after 1184. Likewise, it is unlikely he was much older than 80 when he died, which gives an earliest possible birth year of 1175. He heard Edmund of Abingdon lecture at University of Oxford, although it does not appear that he was granted a degree.

== Royal service under John ==
Gray was a favourite of King John of England, who appointed him Lord Chancellor in 1205; in return, Gray paid John 5,000 marks for the office. In 1209, Gray was one of the king's supporters who helped delay the promulgation in England of the papal bull declaring John excommunicated. Gray accompanied the king to Dover in May 1213 when the king issued a royal charter whereby John became a papal vassal, although Gray did not appear as a witness on the charter. A story was later told that he refused to affix his chancellor's seal to the charter, but this is a later invention. In late 1213 Gray went to Flanders, relinquishing custody of the great seal until his return in January 1214.

Gray was elected Bishop of Lichfield in 1210. John was so determined to secure Gray's election, that one of John's knights locked the cathedral chapter into a room, supposedly telling them that they would not be released until Gray was selected. His election was set aside by Pandulf Verraccio, the papal legate. A second election to the see was also unsuccessful in 1213.

Gray was then elected Bishop of Worcester on 20 January 1214, after resigning as chancellor in October 1214. His consecration as bishop took place on 5 October 1214. Gray was present at the issuing of Magna Carta in June 1215, and then once more travelled outside England, this time recruiting mercenaries for the king.

Gray was elected Archbishop of York on 10 November 1215 through the influence of John and Innocent III. John had wanted Walter, but the canons of York felt that Walter was ill-educated, and elected Simon Langton, brother of Stephen Langton, Archbishop of Canterbury. John objected and wrote to Innocent III complaining of the election of the brother of one of his staunchest enemies, with which Innocent agreed. Innocent was said to have finally decided to give York to Gray because of Gray's virginity, which the pope was said to have declared a great virtue for Gray. However, Gray eventually paid more than 10,000 pounds to the pope in various fees to get his election confirmed. Gray was attending the Fourth Lateran Council when he secured the papal assent to his translation to York and received his pallium at the council.

== Royal service under Henry III ==
Gray was present at John's death and supported the papal legate, Guala Bicchieri, who excommunicated all those opposed to the new king, Henry III, who was still a minor. John had faced an invasion from Prince Louis of France, who had been brought into the kingdom by rebellious English barons. Louis continued to try to seize the throne even after John's death.

Gray was an important royal official during the minority of Henry, who often posted him as a diplomatic envoy. Gray performed the marriage ceremony of Henry's sister Joan to King Alexander II of Scotland in 1221. In 1238 Gray mediated between the papal legate Otto of Tonengo and the University of Oxford, and eventually secured a pardon for the university due to its role in the dispute. Henry also named Gray as guardian of England when the king went to France in 1242. In 1252, Walter hosted King Henry and King Alexander III of Scotland for the Christmas feasts at York, which event cost the archbishop 2,500 pounds.

== As archbishop ==
Gray attempted to assert his archiepiscopal authority over Scotland, which was not only resisted by the Scots but by the Archbishops of Canterbury. Gray had little success in defending his rights to Scotland against either adversary. He also clashed with successive Archbishops of Canterbury over the right of the Archbishops of York to have symbols of their archiepiscopal authority displayed when visiting the archdiocese of Canterbury. This dispute eventually kept Gray from King Henry's second coronation in 1220.

Gray's episcopal acta are the first to survive at York. They exist in two rolls, and this form may have been inspired by his experience with the chancery. Gray set up vicarages in his archdiocese, inspected the monasteries under his episcopal authority, and worked to improve the finances of his cathedral chapter. He also gave vestments and altar equipment to his cathedral. Gray purchased the village of Bishopthorpe, which became the residence of the archbishops. At Westminster, he purchased a house in 1244 that became York Place. (Note: York Place later was converted into Whitehall by King Henry VIII of England.) He also endowed the church at Ripon, and translated the relics of Saint Wilfrid to a new shrine at Ripon. Besides Ripon, he also gave to the construction of the churches at Beverley and Southwell.

During his episcopate, both the north and south transepts of York Minster were constructed. Work on the south transept began by 1225, and on the north one by 1234. Work may have finished by 1251, although the records are sparse and do not allow for an exact date of completion. Traditionally, the south transept has been ascribed to Gray's patronage, although there is no direct evidence for this, merely the location of his tomb within that transept. The north transept was funded by John le Romeyn, the treasurer of the cathedral chapter and a close friend of Gray's. The motive for the construction of new transepts is not known for certain, but Lawrence Hoey speculated that a need to put the shrine of the local saint – William of York – into a grand setting, the need to replace the previous transepts, and the ambition of Romeyn and Gray to display their wealth and power.

Gray held a series of councils in his diocese from 1241 to 1255 which endeavoured to enforce clerical celibacy, keep benefices from being inherited, and improve the education and morals of the clergy. In 1221 Pope Honorius III wrote to Gray and ordered the archbishop to stop the practice of clerical marriage and enforce clerical celibacy in his archdiocese. The pope threatened unspecified admonitions if his commands were not met.

== Death and legacy ==
In 1255 Gray visited London to attend a meeting of parliament, and died at Fulham on 1 May 1255. He was buried on 15 May 1255 at York Minster, His tomb still stands in the south transept, and is constructed of purbeck marble, and is thought to be the first canopied tomb in England. The tomb was restored in 1967–1968 and the coffin was opened, where a painted effigy was discovered on the coffin lid. (Note: The painted portrait was apparently a temporary effigy while the tomb was constructed.) Buried with Gray's skeleton was a chalice, a paten which had been used as a lid for the chalice, a ring, and his crozier. His vestments and other textiles had mostly decayed, but a cushion that had been under his head and two other strips of cloth were still extant. These textiles, along with the metal objects, were removed before the coffin was resealed. (Note: The paten, ring, crozier, and chalice are on display at York Minster.)

Four nephews of Gray were also clerics: William Langton (or Rotherfield) was Dean of York before being elected Archbishop of York but never consecrated, and Walter le Breton, Walter de Gray, and Henry de Gray, who were canons of York. (Note: The nephews Walter de Gray and Henry de Gray were sons of the elder Walter's brother Robert.) Other more distant kinsmen continued to hold clerical and ecclesiastical offices throughout the 13th and early 14th centuries. Walter Giffard, a later Archbishop of York, was also a relative of some degree that is not precisely known.

== Citations ==
Political offices
Preceded by Hubert Walter	Lord Chancellor; 1205–1214	Succeeded by Richard Marsh
Catholic Church titles
Preceded by Mauger of Worcester	Bishop of Worcester; 1214–1216	Succeeded by Sylvester of Worcester
Preceded by Simon Langton	Archbishop of York; 1216–1255	Succeeded by Sewal de Bovil
