= Sewal de Bovil =

Archbishop of York from 1255 to 1258

- Archbishop of York
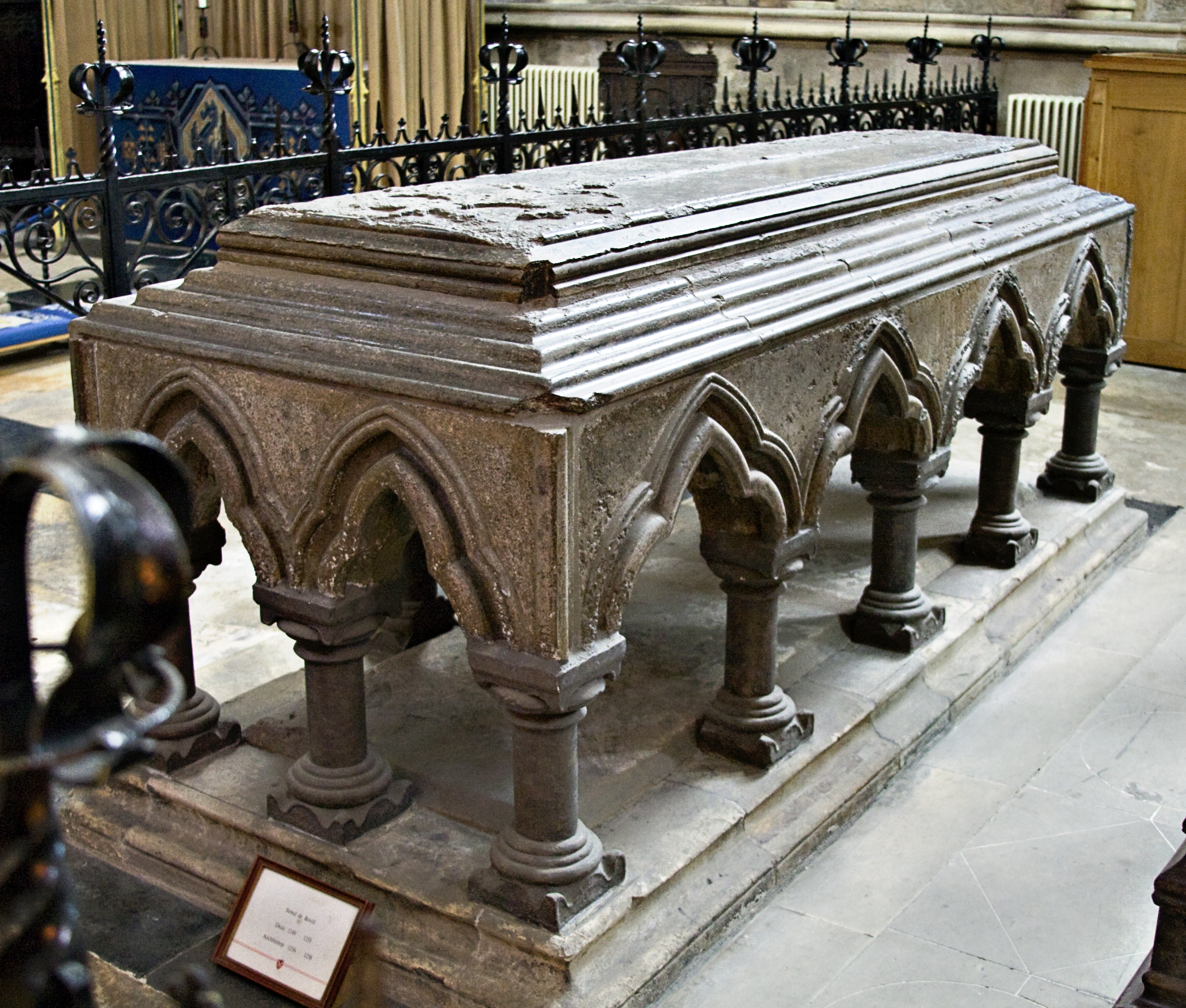
- Tomb of Bovil in York Minster
- Elected: c. 1 October 1255
- Term ended: 10 May 1258
- Predecessor: Walter de Gray
- Successor: Godfrey Ludham
- Other post: Dean of York

Orders
- Consecration: 23 July 1256 by Walter de Cantilupe

Personal details
- Born: Sewal de Bovil
- Died: 10 May 1258
- Buried: York Minster

Sewal de Bovil (died 1258) was a medieval Archbishop of York.

== Life ==
Nothing is known of Bovil's origins or his parents, but he attended Oxford University at around the same time as Edmund of Abingdon, who became Bovil's good friend. He first appears as a canon of York Minster in 1236, and was holding the prebend of Fenton by October 1240. He was Archdeacon of York by January 1248, but had been named Dean of York by 21 September 1249. He earned a doctor of theology title by 1244.

Bovil was archbishop for only two years between 1256 and his death in 1258. He was selected about 1 October 1255 and was consecrated on 23 July 1256, at York by Walter de Cantilupe, Bishop of Worcester. He received a papal dispensation to become archbishop because he was illegitimate on 11 March 1256. Pope Alexander IV then provided Jordan, an Italian, to the now vacant deanery, but Bovil objected and attempted to keep Jordan out. Alexander IV then excommunicated the archbishop in 1257. After a compromise was reached whereby Jordan received a pension, Bovil was absolved. Godfrey Ludham was then promoted to the deanery. In July 1257 he was appointed to a commission to mediate between King Alexander III of Scotland and the Scottish nobles.

The archbishop died on 10 May 1258 and was buried in York Minster. Matthew Paris wrote that he was "a humble and holy man well skilled in law and other sciences."

== Citations ==
Catholic Church titles
Preceded by Walter de Gray	Archbishop of York; 1256–1258	Succeeded by Godfrey Ludham
