= William Langton =

13th-century Archbishop of York-elect

- Archbishop of York-elect
- Elected: 12 March 1265
- Term ended: November 1265
- Predecessor: Godfrey Ludham
- Successor: Bonaventure
- Other posts: Dean of York; Archdeacon of York

Orders
- Consecration: never consecrated

Personal details
- Died: 15 July 1279
- Buried: York Minster
- Parents: Robert de Gray

William Langton (or William of Rotherfield; died 1279) was a medieval English priest and nephew of Archbishop Walter de Gray. William was selected but never consecrated as Archbishop of York and Bishop of Carlisle.

Langton was the son of Robert de Gray of Rotherfield Greys, who was the brother of Walter de Gray, Archbishop of York. Langton held the prebend of Strensall by 24 June 1245. He was named Archdeacon of York by 21 September 1249. By 23 April 1255 he was the rector of Great Mitton, West Riding, Yorkshire, and was named Dean of York by 16 March 1262. On 12 March 1265, he was elected to fill the role of Archbishopric of York, however his election was quashed in November 1265 by the pope. He continued to hold office as Dean and was elected Bishop of Carlisle on 13 December 1278 but refused the office.

Langton died on 15 July 1279 and was buried in the south transept of York Minster.

== Citations ==
Catholic Church titles
Preceded by Godfrey Ludham	Archbishop of York; Election quashed 1265	Succeeded by Bonaventure
Preceded by Robert de Chauncy	Bishop of Carlisle; Elected but refused office 1278	Succeeded by Ralph of Irton
