= William de Wickwane =

Archbishop of York from 1279 to 1285

- Archbishop of York
- Elected: 22 June 1279
- Installed: 25 December 1279
- Term ended: 27 August 1285
- Predecessor: Walter Giffard
- Successor: John le Romeyn
- Other post: prebendary in York

Orders
- Consecration: 17 September 1279 by Pope Nicholas III

Personal details
- Died: 27 August 1285 Pontigny Abbey Burgundy
- Buried: Pontigny Abbey

William de Wickwane (died 1285) was Archbishop of York between 1279 and 1285.

== Life ==
Wickwane's background is unknown, as is his place of education, but he was referred to as magister so he probably attended a university. He was prebendary of North Newald in Yorkshire by 1265 and also held the prebend of Ripon. He was elected Archbishop of York on 22 June 1279, and consecrated on 17 September 1279 by Pope Nicholas III at Viterbo. On his return to England, he had his primatial cross carried in front of him through the see of Canterbury, thus reviving a centuries-old controversy between York and Canterbury. He was enthroned at York Minster on Christmas Day 1279. The matter of the cross involved Wickwane in a dispute with Archbishop John Peckham of Canterbury.

While archbishop, in 1281 Wickwane tried to make an archiepiscopal visitation of the cathedral chapter of Durham, but was forcibly prevented by the cathedral chapter, after which Wickwane excommunicated the chapter and Robert of Holy Island, the Bishop of Durham, and placed the entire diocese of Durham under interdict. The chapter and bishop appealed to Rome, and the case dragged on for six years before eventually being settled by a compromise. He also wrote to Bogo de Clare while the later was still a canon of York Minster, taking Bogo to task for the state of the vestments and other liturgical items in the cathedral. Wickwane also attempted to keep clergy who kept concubines from performing clerical functions in the diocese of York.

Wickwane died on 26 August or 27 August 1285 at Pontigny Abbey in Burgundy while on his way to the papal curia to plead his case against the monks of Durham. He was buried at the Cistercian abbey there in Pontigny.

== Citations ==
Catholic Church titles
Preceded by Walter Giffard	Archbishop of York; 1279–1285	Succeeded by John le Romeyn
