= Simon Langton (priest) =

13th-century Archbishop of York-elect, Archdeacon of Canterbury

- Archdeacon of Canterbury
- Province: Canterbury
- Diocese: Canterbury
- Appointed: 1227
- Term ended: 1248
- Predecessor: Henry Sandford
- Successor: Stephen de Monte Luelli
- Other post: Archbishop-elect of York

Personal details
- Died: 1248
- Denomination: Roman Catholic Church

Simon Langton (died 1248) was an English medieval clergyman who served as Archdeacon of Canterbury from 1227 until his death in 1248. He had previously been Archbishop-elect of York, but the election was quashed by Pope Innocent III.

== Life ==
Langton held the prebend of Strensall in the diocese of York by 20 November 1214. He was the brother of Stephen Langton, who became Archbishop of Canterbury in 1207. A third brother Walter was a Knight, serving in the Albigensian Crusades and being captured and ransomed, and when he died childless in 1234, Simon Langton was left with the lands and his substantial debts. He probably studied at Paris, where his brother was a noted instructor. Langton was employed by his brother in the negotiations with King John of England in 1210, when Simon told John that Stephen would not lift the interdict unless John put himself "wholly in his mercy." He had also appeared at the 1208 Winchester council to present the papal demands to allow Stephen into the see of Canterbury.

Langton was elected in June 1215 to fill the Archbishopric of York. King John had wanted the selection of Walter de Gray, John's Chancellor and Bishop of Worcester. However, the canons of York felt that Gray was uneducated and selected Langton instead. John objected and wrote to Pope Innocent III complaining of the election of the brother of one of his staunchest enemies, and Innocent agreed. Langton had previously been forbidden to seek the office, and accordingly the election was quashed on 20 August 1215 by the pope. Langton then proceeded to join Prince Louis of France's invasion of England in 1215, and acted as Louis' chancellor, against the express wishes of the pope. Because of this, in 1216 he was excommunicated, and deprived of all benefices, He was eventually absolved, and made an official of the papal court and allowed to hold a prebend in France.

On 14 May 1227 Langton was appointed Archdeacon of Canterbury and held that office until his death in 1248. In January 1235 he was employed by King Henry III of England to negotiate a renewal of the truce with France. He also represented Archbishop Edmund Rich at Rome in a number of disputes. Besides the renewal of the peace treaty, Langton represented King Henry in many diplomatic missions. He was a patron to the Franciscans in England and left a library to the University of Paris.

== Citations ==
Catholic Church titles
Preceded by Geoffrey Plantagenet (archbishop)	Archbishop-elect of York; 1215	Succeeded by Walter de Gray (archbishop)
Preceded by Henry Sandford	Archdeacon of Canterbury; 1227–1248	Succeeded by Stephen de Monte Luelli
