= John le Romeyn =

Archbishop of York from 1286 to 1296

- Archbishop of York
- Elected: 29 October 1285
- Installed: 9 June 1286
- Term ended: 11 March 1296
- Predecessor: William de Wickwane
- Successor: Henry of Newark
- Other post: chancellor of Lincoln diocese

Orders
- Consecration: 10 February 1286 by Latino Malabranca Orsini

Personal details
- Born: c. 1230
- Died: 11 March 1296 Bishop Burton, Yorkshire
- Buried: York Minster
- Parents: John le Romeyn

John le Romeyn (or John Romanus), died 1296, was a medieval Archbishop of York.

== Early life and education ==
Romeyn was the illegitimate son of John le Romeyn the elder, treasurer of York. The younger John was born while his father was still a subdeacon, and nothing is known about his mother, except for a 14th-century chronicler's mention that she was a waiting woman. His birth was probably around 1230. He was a master at Oxford University and a Doctor of Theology at the University of Paris by 1276.

== Career ==
Romeyn was rector of Nether Wallop, Hampshire and precentor and chancellor of Lincoln as well as holding the prebend of Warthill in Yorkshire before being elected Archbishop of York on 29 October 1285. Romeyn went to Rome to receive his pallium, but while there questions arose about the canonical validity of his election, so John resigned, and a new election was held under Pope Honorius IV's supervision, where Romeyn was once more elected. He was consecrated in Rome on 10 February 1286 by Latino Malabranca Orsini, the Bishop of Ostia, nephew of the future Pope Nicholas III. He was enthroned in York Minster on 9 June 1286.

During Romeyn's first seven months as archbishop, he held two group ordinations of priests and attended Convocation as well as visiting eighteen priories, twelve of the rural deaneries, the towns Otley, Ripon and Beverley, and an abbey. Romeyn often used the Bishop of Whithorn as his deputy for confirmations and other ecclesiastical matters. In 1286 he issued an order to all the clergy in his diocese that held benefices but that were not yet ordained a priest to come to Tadcaster to be ordained.

From the late 13th century onwards the Archbishops of York monitored Kirklees Priory as there was considerable concern for its spiritual health. In 1287 Romeyn asked the prior of St Oswald's to visit the convent. He was instructed to hear the nuns' confessions and to ensure that they were living worthy lives, keeping a secure house and adhering to the church's and their order's doctrines and laws. In August 1287, the parish church of Saint Oswald, in Oswaldkirk, was re-consecrated by Henry, Bishop of Whithorn on Romeyn's mandate.

On 25 January 1288, Romeyn issued a decree concerning the financing of a chapter house at Southwell Minster.

On 27 April 1289, Romeyn requested the Provincial, Henry of Hanna, to receive Richard Manlovel, a canon of Thurgarton, of the Order of St. Augustine, into the Carmelite Order.

When members of York's Jewish community faced expulsion in 1290, Romeyn told his parishioners that they would be excommunicated if they harmed any of them.

In 1293, Romeyn was brought before Parliament on a charge of usurping the royal prerogatives for having excommunicated Anthony Bek, the Bishop of Durham, because Bek allowed the arrest of two priests of Durham. Parliament held that Bek had been acting as earl palatine and not as a bishop, and ordered that the archbishop be imprisoned. However, Romeyn avoided arrest by paying a fine of 4000 marks to King Edward I of England. Romeyn was a member of a few embassies for Edward I, but otherwise does not seem to have been involved in the government of the kingdom.

== Death ==
The archbishop died on 11 March 1296 at Bishop Burton near Beverley in Yorkshire and was buried at York Minster.

== Citations ==
Catholic Church titles
Preceded by William de Wickwane	Archbishop of York; 1286–1296	Succeeded by Henry of Newark
