= Bolton Percy hoard =

9th-century coin hoard

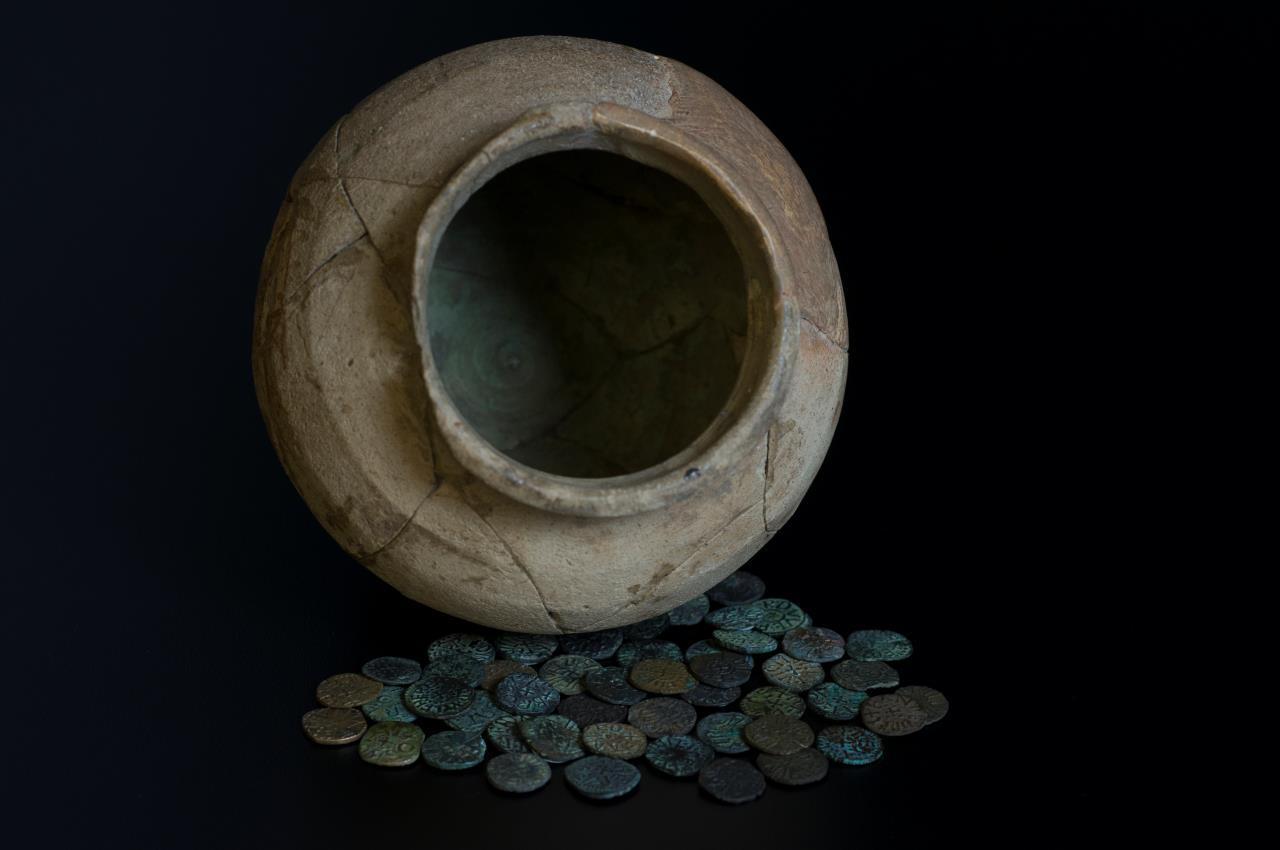
- Coins and vessel, Yorkshire Museum
- Type: Hoard
- Material: Metal, clay, textile
- Size: c. 4,000 coins
- Created: c. 867 (deposited)
- Period/culture: Early medieval
- Discovered: 1846, 1967; Bolton Percy, North Yorkshire, England
- Discovered by: William Foster (1846); John and Malcolm Miles (1967)
- Identification: YORYM : 1967.6.1; YORYM 1976.6
- Culture: Northumbrian

The Bolton Percy hoard is a hoard of Northumbrian stycas that were recovered close to the village of Bolton Percy in North Yorkshire, England, on two occasions over a century apart. The discovery of the first parcel of coins took place in 1846; the second discovery by schoolboys in 1967. Hugh Pagan connected the concealment with a date of c. 866 coinciding with the Viking attack on York or its aftermath. Material from the hoard, as well as the vessel, is primarily held in the Yorkshire Museum, but coins from it are also in the collections of the British Museum, Leeds City Museum and Danum Museum.

== Discovery ==
The first parcel of coins was discovered in 1846, by a workman called William Foster. Initially referred to as the 'Ulleskelf' hoard, it contained approximately 2,000 coins.

The second parcel was discovered in 1967. It was initially found by two schoolboys, John and Malcolm Miles, who found a number of coins in a ploughed field close to the River Wharfe in the parish of Bolton Percy. The boys reported the find to their teacher, who contacted the Keeper of the Yorkshire Museum, G. F. Willmot, who undertook an excavation of the area and recovered the rest, and much larger portion of, the hoard. Some of these coins were contained within a ceramic vessel made of badorf ware, whereas the others were in a compact mass with the shape of a box. Willmot was able to ascertain that this find was from the same field as that of 1846. The number of coins recovered in this second discovery was approximately 1775. These were photographed and catalogued prior to sale. Due to the fact the coins are made of copper-alloy, which at the time meant that the hoard did not meet the definition of treasure, the hoard was not subject to the treasure trove process.

York Museums Trust, who own a considerable portion of both groups of coins, consider the two finds to be part of the same hoard.

== Coins ==
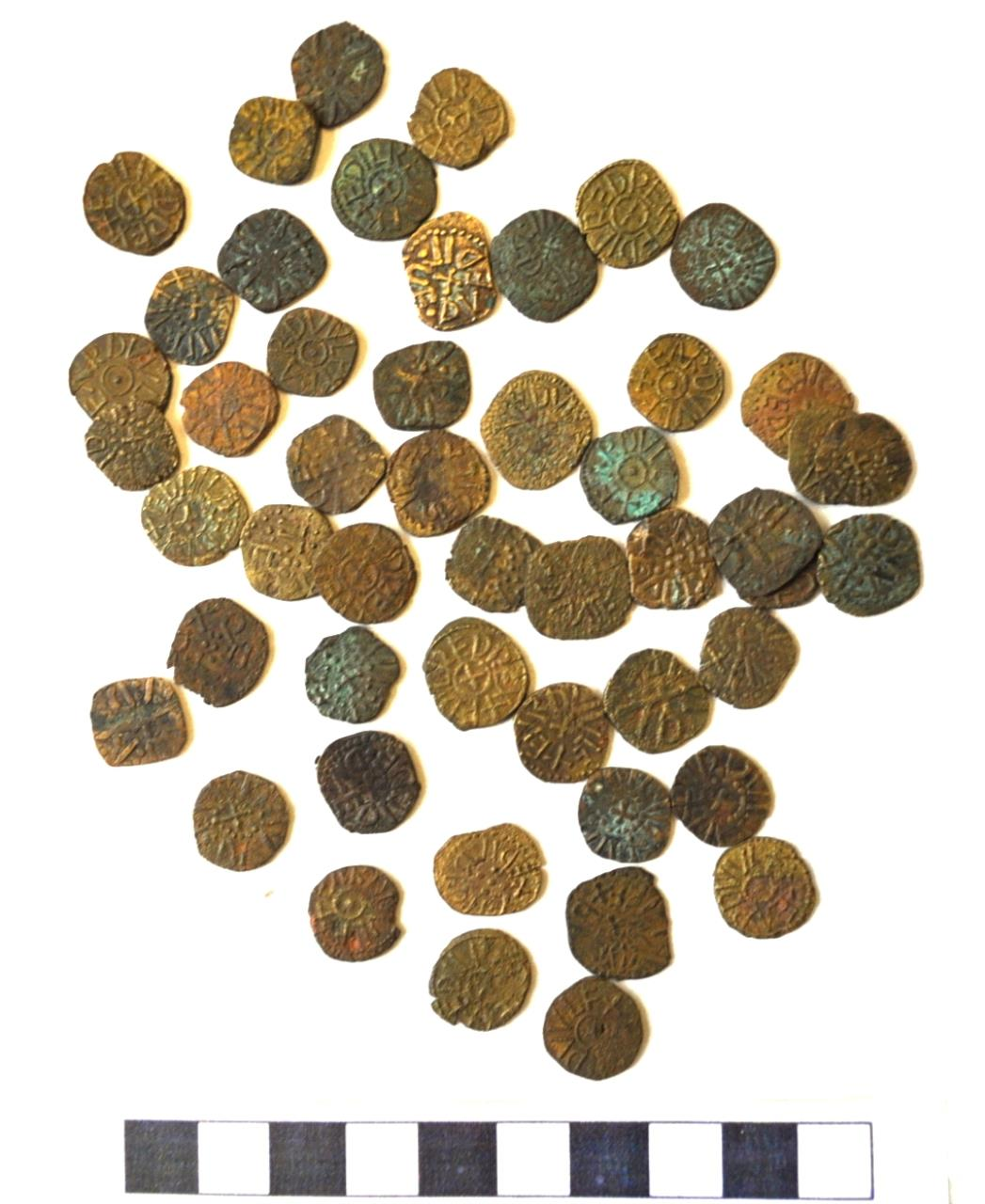
Coins from the hoard (York Museums Trust)

Lyon, writing about the 1846 parcel in 1955, described how he had examined a catalogue of the coins from the hoard written by Charles Wellbeloved. This catalogue also included finds from the St Leonard's Place hoard. Pagan, writing on the 1967 parcel in 1971, described how it contained many coins that were derivative in character, some of which may date to a period after the issues of Osberht and Wulfhere. The group contained issues from the reigns of kings Eanred, Aethelred II, Redwulf, as well as Osberht. It also contained coins from the episcopacies of Eanbald II and Wigmund, as well as Wulfhere. Pagan compared the hoard's composition to that of the Ripon, Paisley, Kirkoswald, St Leonard's Place and Talnotrie hoards. The total number of coins estimated from both discoveries is approximately 4,000.

== Dating ==
Dating for the concealment of the hoard varies. Suggestions include a broad date range from 850s to 860s, as well as a report by Northern Archaeological Associates giving a date of c. 857. The former broader approach has been favoured by some: numismatist Elizabeth Pirie, drawing on the work of C.S.S. Lyon, dated concealment to between 855 and 867 "once official production had ceased". Hugh Pagan, writing in the introduction to the catalogue of 1971 sale of the 1967 find, dated the hoard's concealment to the end of the coinage, and suggested there was a "prima facie possibility that it was connected with the Viking invasion that brought the independent kingdom of Northumbria to an end in 867". Writing again in 1973, he connected the concealment with a date of c. 866 coinciding with the Viking attack on York or its aftermath.

== Acquisition ==
After the 1846 discovery, the Yorkshire Museum acquired some coins from the hoard. Of these 613 were able to be distinguished by Elizabeth Pirie in 1996. Some coins from this find are also in the collections of Danum and 30 at Leeds City Museum.

In the 1971 sale of the 1967 discovery, the Yorkshire Museum was also able to purchase 246 for its collection, particularly derivative issues. The museum had previously acquired the vessel. Further coins from this discovery are held in the British Museum.

== Gallery ==
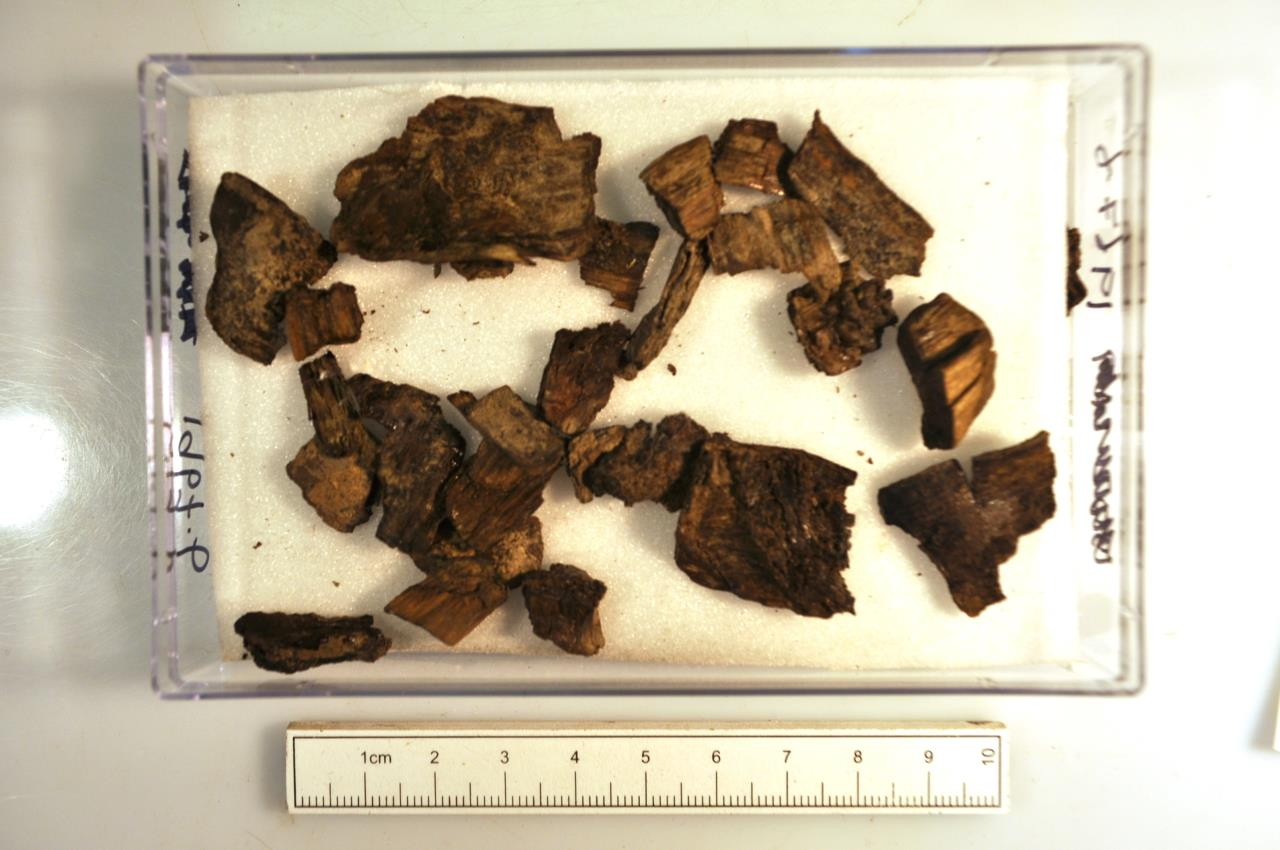
Wooden fragments associated with the 1967 find

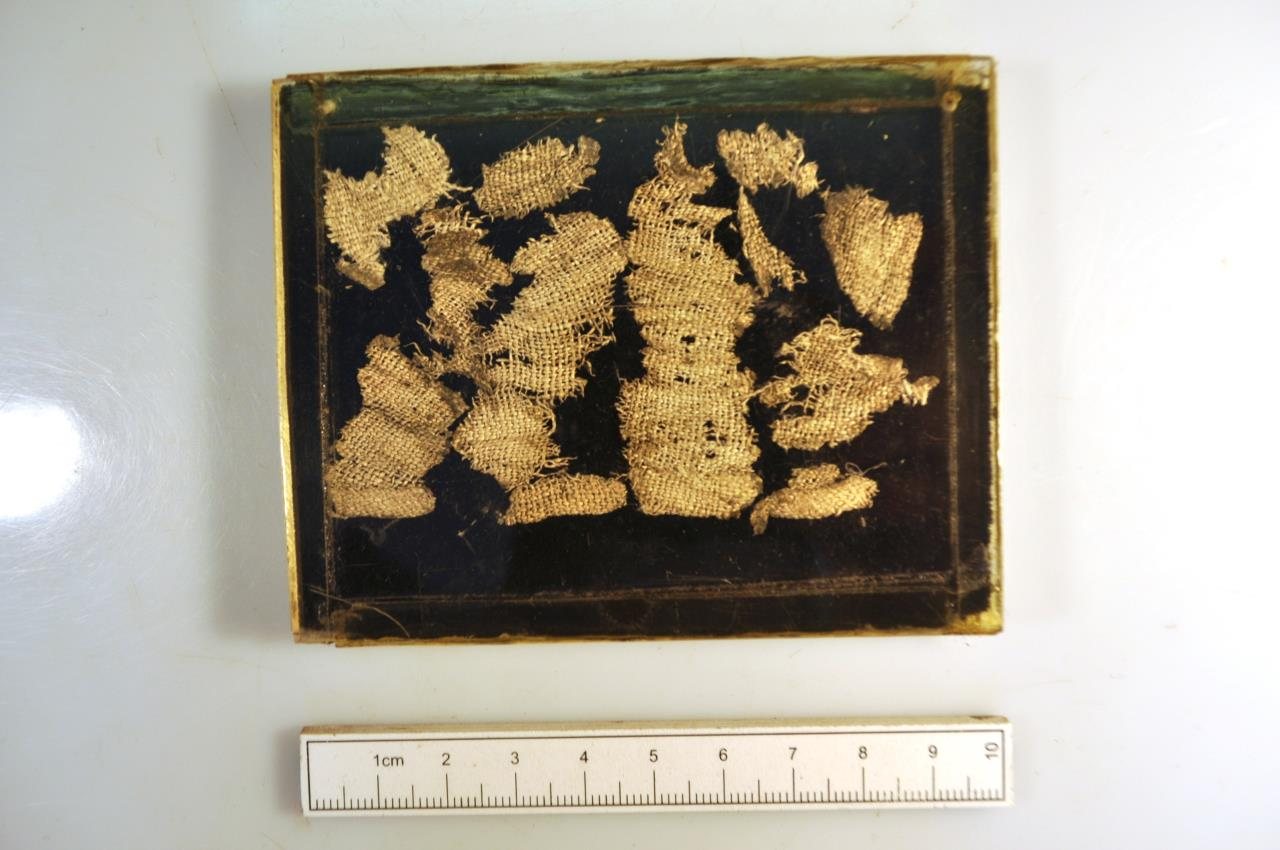
Textile fragments associated with the 1967 find

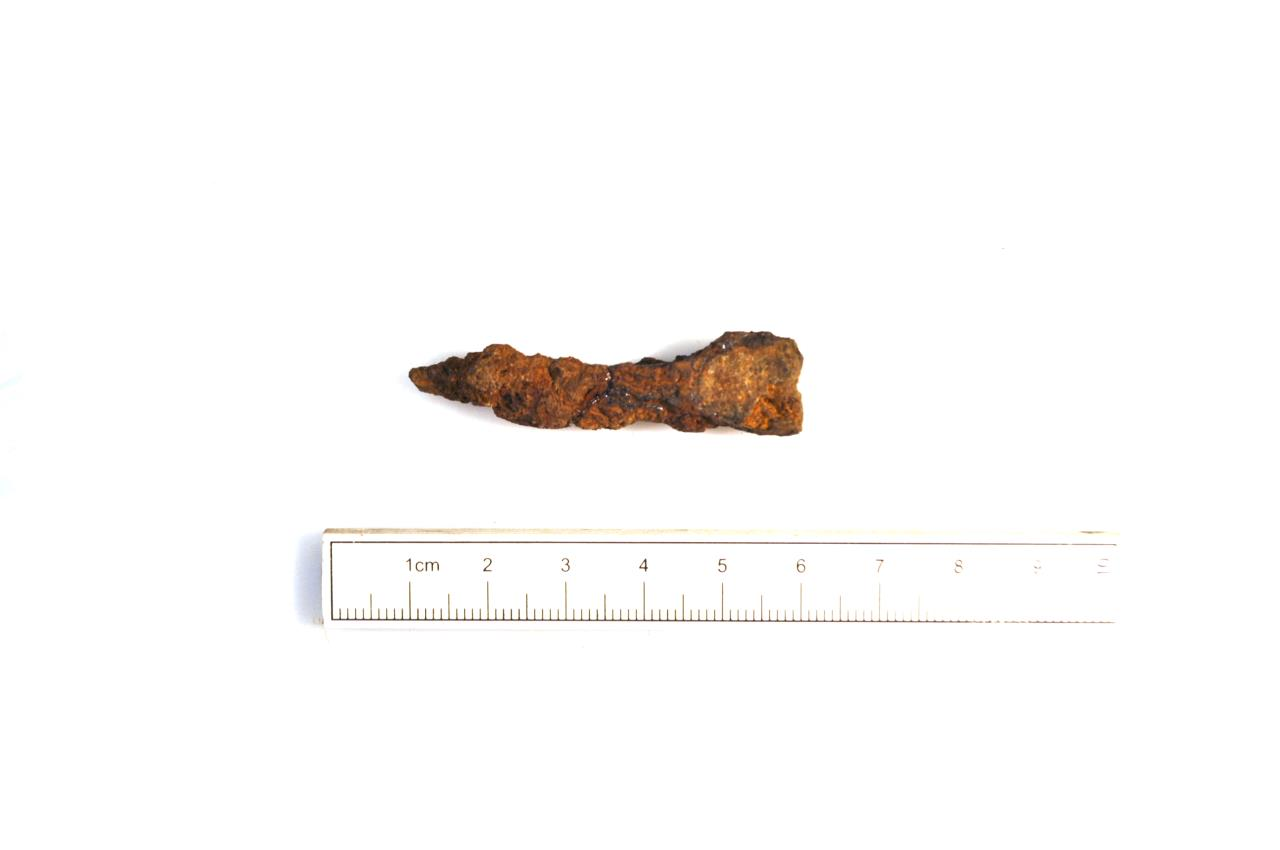
Iron nail associated with the 1967 find

== See also ==
- Hexham hoard
- St Leonard's Place hoard
