= Kirkoswald hoard =

9th-century Cumbrian hoard

Kirkoswald Hoard
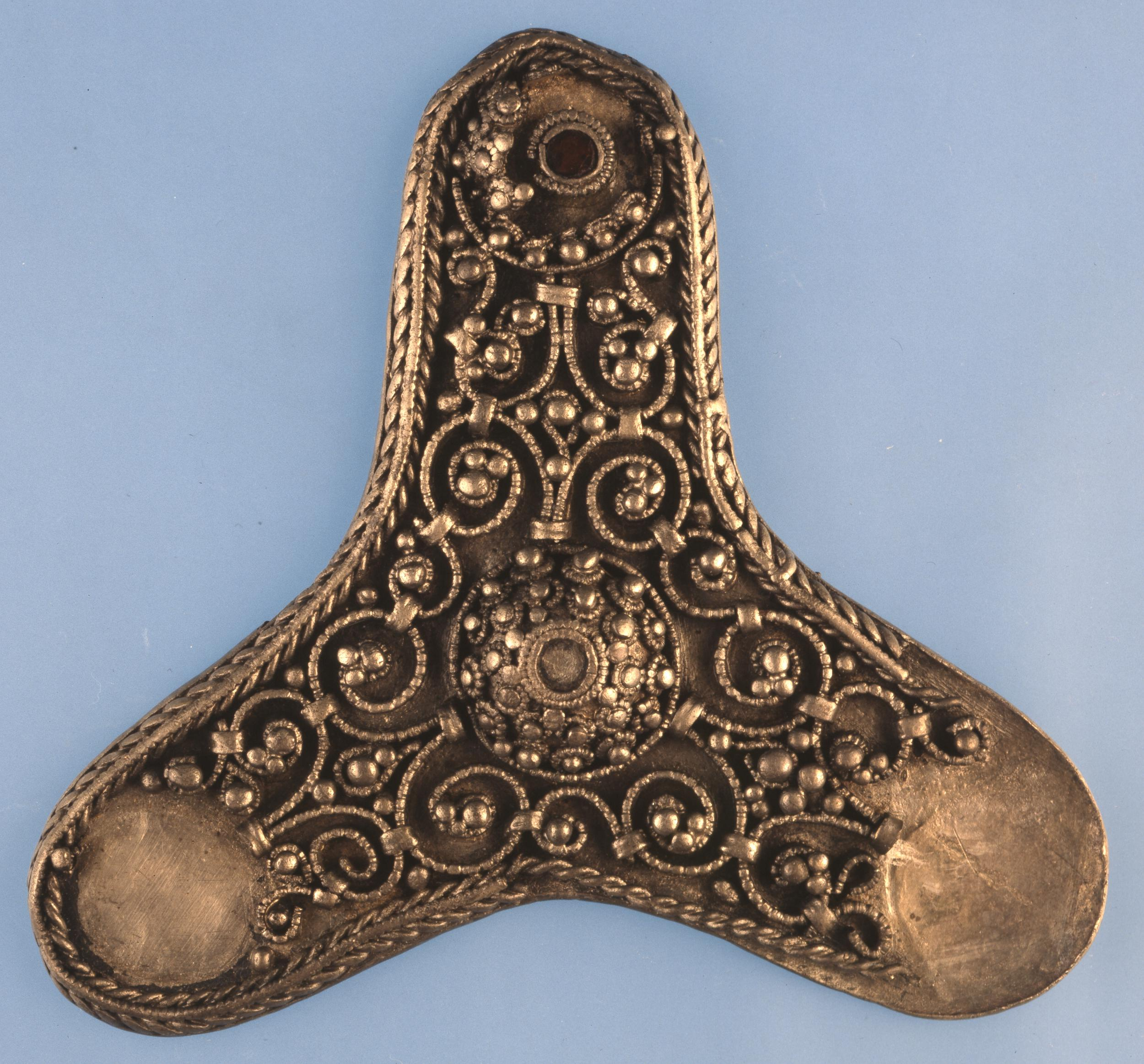
- Silver trefoil ornament from Kirkoswald Hoard
- Created: c.865 (deposited)
- Discovered: 1808; Kirkoswald, Cumbria
- Culture: Northumbrian

The Kirkoswald hoard is a ninth-century hoard of 542 copper alloy coins of the Kingdom of Northumbria and a silver trefoil ornament, which were discovered amongst tree roots in 1808 within the parish of Kirkoswald in Cumbria, UK.

== Discovery ==
The hoard was discovered in 1808 near the village of Kirkoswald in Cumbria. It was found within the roots of a tree which had been blown down; other than the parish, there is no further find spot recorded.

== Contents ==
The hoard comprised 542 or more (Note: Other sources suggest there were 700 coins in the hoard.) stycas, as well as a silver trefoil ornament. The coins within the assemblage were issued by the kings of Northumbria, Eanred, Aethelred II, Redwulf and Osberht, as well as by the archbishops of York, Eanbald II, Wigmund and Wulfhere. They were first described by the antiquarian John Adamson. Based on the contents of the hoard, its date of deposition has been attributed to c.865. Comparisons have been made between the metalwork on the trefoil ornament and objects found in the Trewhiddle Hoard and in the West Yorkshire Hoard. Whilst it appears to have been deposited at the same time as the coins, it may date from the late eighth century.

== Acquisition ==
Soon after its discovery the hoard was split up: the ornament was eventually purchased by the British Museum. The coins were split and parcels of the find made their way into the hands of private collections. By 1814, six coins from the find were in the collection of the Society of Antiquaries of Newcastle. They were donated by the Atkinson family who had an estate at Temple Sowerby nearby. The whereabouts of the rest of the coins are unknown.

== See also ==
- List of hoards in Great Britain
- Hexham Hoard
- Elizabeth Pirie
