= Hexham hoard =

Hoard of ninth-century stycas

Hexham Hoard
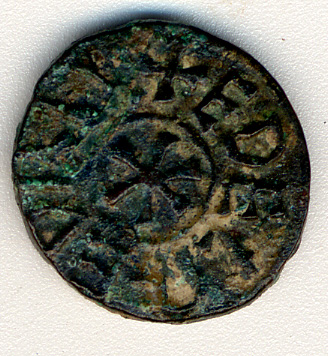
- Styca of Aethelred II from Hexham Hoard
- Created: c.850 (deposited), 9th century (mid)
- Period/culture: Anglo-Saxon
- Place: Hexham, Northumberland

The Hexham hoard is a 9th-century hoard of eight thousand copper-alloy coins of the Anglo-Saxon Kingdom of Northumbria, which were discovered whilst a grave was being dug close to Hexham Abbey in 1832.

== Discovery ==
"An Account of the Discovery at Hexham ..." [proceed to p. 367] (Archaeologia, or, Miscellaneous tracts relating to antiquity – Society of Antiquaries of London. Volume 25, 1834)

The hoard was uncovered on 15 October 1832, whilst the grave of a man called William Errington was being dug on the west side of the north transept of Hexham Abbey by the sexton and his assistant. The area outside the church where the grave was being dug was known as Campey Hill and at the time had only recently become part of the burial ground. The grave itself was dug unusually deeply, striking the vessel that contained the coins. The sexton, Mr Airey, recognised the potential importance of the find and stopped the entire assemblage being dispersed; however a significant portion of the coin hoard was lost before it could be examined. The coins were held within a bronze bucket, which was broken during its discovery; it was acquired by the British Museum, who later reconstructed it. The hoard was initially published and catalogued by the antiquarian John Adamson. Further specimens were recorded when the grave was re-opened in 1841.

== Coins ==
The Hexham hoard consisted of approximately eight thousand Northumbrian stycas. These included specimens from the reigns of three kings Eanred, Aethelred II and Redwulf, as well as coins of two archbishops Eanbald and Wigmund. There were additional coins in the hoard, whose attribution to a particular issuer are difficult to clarify and are known as 'irregulars'.

The assemblage contains no coins of Osberht or Archbishop Wulfhere. Numismatist, C S Lyon, suggested that the hoard was concealed either in the reign of Redwulf or in the second reign of Aethelred II, giving a date of concealment of circa 845; historian Hugh Pagan dates concealment to Aethelred II's second reign.

Study of the stycas from Hexham, as well as other hoards including Kirkoswald, Bolton Percy and several finds from York, was done by Elizabeth Pirie who created the typology for the coinage.

== Acquisition ==
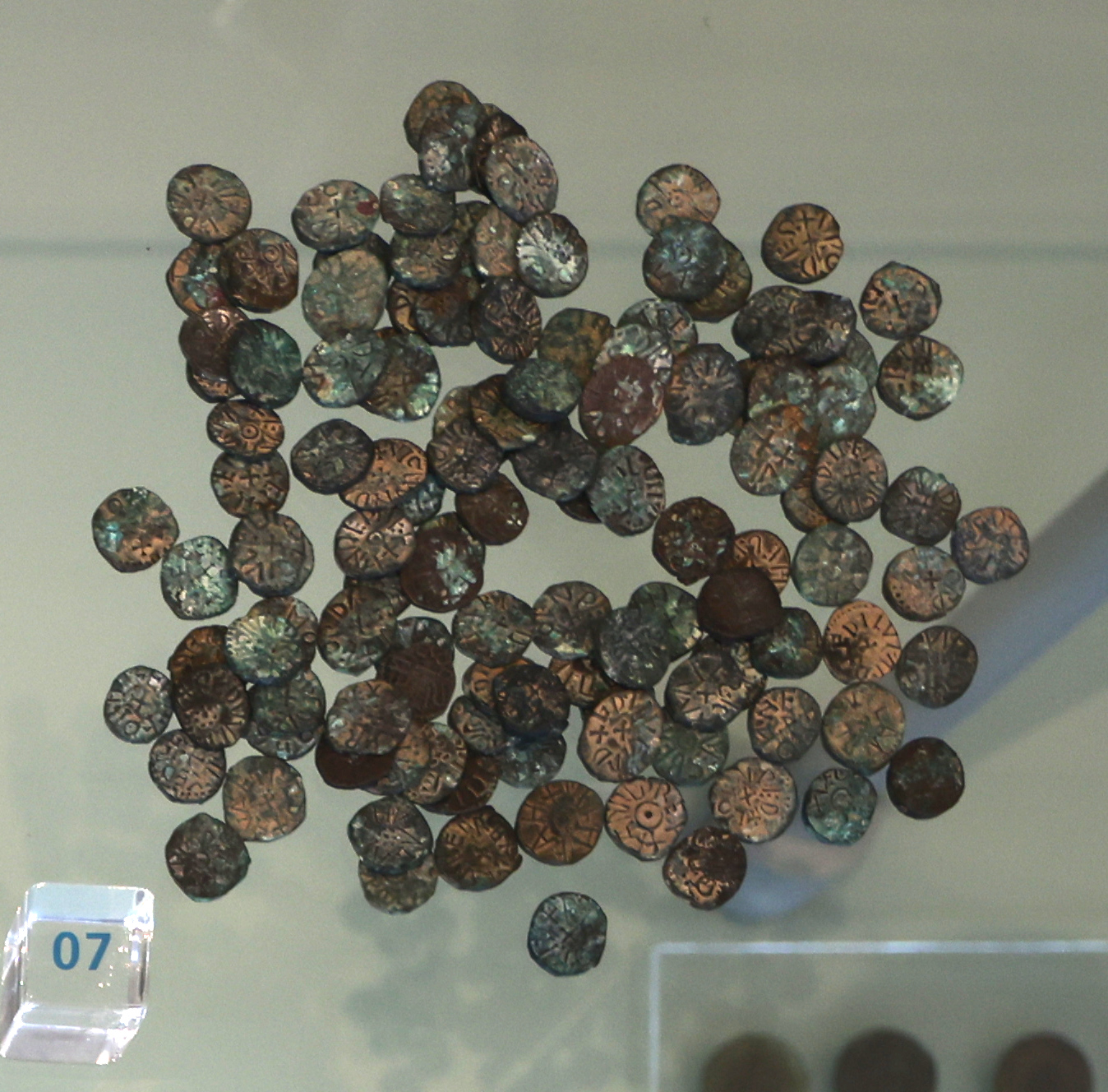
Coins of the Hexham hoard in Manchester Museum

The hoard was divided and parcels of the coins from it were sold to a number of institutions, including: British Museum; the Society of Antiquaries of Newcastle; the Ashmolean Museum (who also had a portion of the bucket for a period of time); Whitby Museum; Manchester Art Gallery – where an unopened parcel from the hoard was 're-discovered' in 1977.

== See also ==
- List of hoards in Britain
- Hexham Abbey
- Styca
