= Wulfsige of York =

9th-century Archbishop of York

Wulfsige
- Archbishop of York
- Appointed: after 808
- Term ended: between 830 and 837
- Predecessor: Eanbald II
- Successor: Wigmund

Orders
- Consecration: after 808

Personal details
- Died: between 830 and 837

Wulfsige was a medieval Archbishop of York.

Wulfsige was consecrated sometime after 808 and he died between 830 and 837.

== Citations ==
Christian titles
Preceded by Eanbald II	Archbishop of York c. 808– c. 834	Succeeded by Wigmund
