= Wulfstan (died 956) =

Archbishop of York from 931 to 956

- Archbishop of York
- Appointed: 931
- Term ended: 26 December 956
- Predecessor: Hrotheweard
- Successor: Oscytel

Orders
- Consecration: 931

Personal details
- Died: December 956 Oundle, Northamptonshire
- Buried: Oundle, Northamptonshire

Wulfstan (died December 956) was Archbishop of York between 931 and 952. He is often known as Wulfstan I, to separate him from Wulfstan II, Archbishop of York.

== Early life ==
Wulfstan was consecrated in 931. He was presumably appointed with the consent of King Æthelstan, and attested all of the king's charters between 931 and 935. Between 936 and 41, however, he was absent from the king's court, for unknown reasons.

== Career ==
Wulfstan's career is characterised by frequent swapping of allegiances, both among Viking leaders from Dublin and the Wessex kings. Perhaps Wulfstan played the part of 'king-maker' in Northumbrian politics in the mid-10th century, or perhaps he was guided by self-preservation and the interests of the Church in Northumbria.

In 939, King Olaf Guthfrithson of Dublin invaded Northumbria and occupied York. King Edmund of England marched north to remove Olaf from York, but in 940 Wulfstan and Archbishop Wulfhelm of Canterbury arranged a treaty that ceded the area between Watling Street and the border of Northumbria to Olaf. But Olaf died in late 940, and his rule in York was inherited by his cousin, Olaf Sitricson who became King of Jórvík. In 944, Olaf Sitricson and his co-ruler Ragnald Guthfrithson were driven out from York; the chronicler Æthelweard wrote that it was "Bishop Wulfstan and the eoldormen of the Mercians" who were responsible for their expulsion. In 947 Wulfstan invited Eric Bloodaxe, the former king of Norway and the Earl of Orkney to become King of Jórvík. Eadred of Wessex brutally ravaged Northumbria in 948, forcing Eric to leave Northumbria. Olaf Cuaran then resumed his second reign at York. By 951, Wulfstan appears to have supported Eric's claim to the kingdom of York over Olaf as he ceased to witness charters at the English court. In 952, Olaf was driven out by the Northumbrians in favor of Eric.

== Later life ==
Eadred then re-invaded and imprisoned Wulfstan. The Anglo-Saxon Chronicle version D says that "because accusations had often been made to the king against him", Eadred arrested Wulfstan and took him to Iudanbyrig (the location of which is not known). He attested some charters in 953, so he was not imprisoned then. Although he was restored to episcopal office, he had to exercise his authority from distant Dorchester, 230 mi (370 km) from York. He appears not to have attended court for most of 956 and was possibly in failing health by then. According to Lesley Abrams: "After the sidelining to the treacherous Wulfstan I, Oscytel, a kinsman of Oda, became Archbishop of York in 956." He died at Oundle, Northamptonshire, on 16 or 26 December 956. He was buried at Oundle.

== Assessment ==
The historian Clare Downham observes that Wulfstan was almost certainly made archbishop in 931 with Æthelstan's support:

It may seem surprising, then, that the bishop was a staunch supporter of Scandinavian rule in York throughout his career, or at least whenever he felt it safe to do so. Some hints of this are provided in the Anglo-Saxon Chronicle (D). This shows that Wulfstan accompanied a Scandinavian king called Olafr on a raid into Mercia. Wulfstan later swore allegiance to Eadred, King of England (946–55), but he broke his oath soon after and endured temporary imprisonment by the same King in the 950s. Wulfstan thus appears as a power-broker and a leading figure in Northumbria at this time. But he was also someone who took political risks with varying success.

== Citations ==
Christian titles
Preceded by Hrotheweard	Archbishop of York; 931–952	Succeeded by Oscytel
