= Hrotheweard =

10th-century Archbishop of York

- Archbishop of York
- Appointed: between 904 and 928
- Term ended: 931
- Predecessor: Æthelbald
- Successor: Wulfstan

Orders
- Consecration: between 904 and 928

Personal details
- Died: 931

Hrotheweard (or Lodeward) was Archbishop of York starting some time between 904 and 928 and ending with his death in 931.

== Citations ==
Christian titles
Preceded by Æthelbald	Archbishop of York c. 912–931	Succeeded by Wulfstan
