= Æthelbald of York =

10th-century Archbishop of York

Æthelbald
- Archbishop of York
- Appointed: 900
- Term ended: between 904 and 928
- Predecessor: Wulfhere
- Successor: Hrotheweard

Orders
- Consecration: 900

Personal details
- Died: between 904 and 928

Æthelbald (Note: Sometimes Æthelbeald, Athelbald, or Ethelbald) was a medieval Archbishop of York.

Æthelbald was consecrated in 900. He died between 904 and 928.

== Citations ==
Christian titles
Preceded by Wulfhere	Archbishop of York; 900–c. 912	Succeeded by Hrotheweard
