= John Adamson (antiquary) =

English lawyer and antiquary (1787–1855)

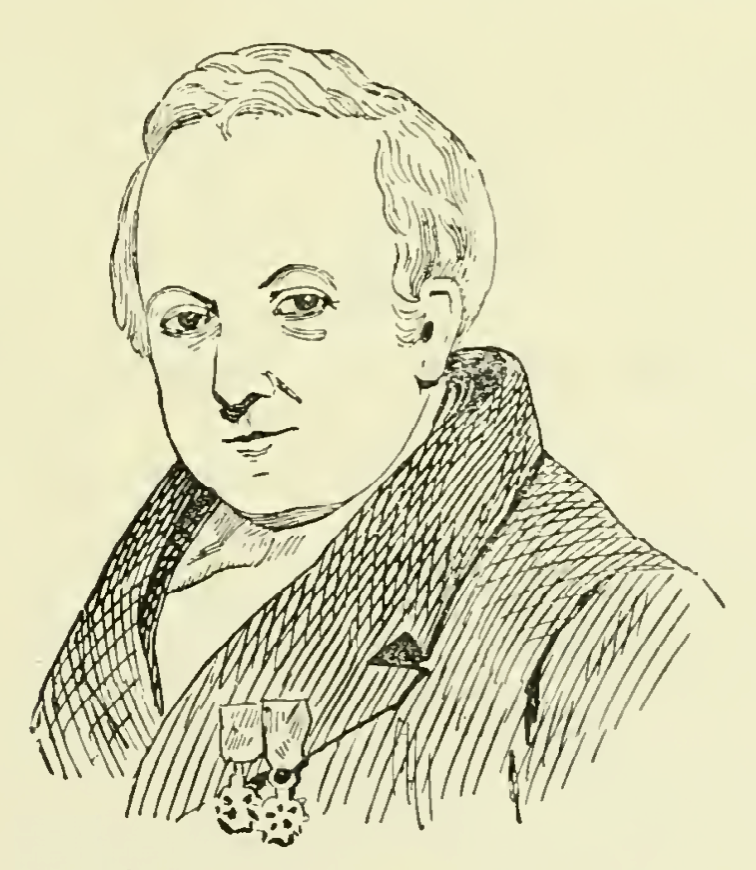
John Adamson

John Adamson (1787–1855) was a lawyer, antiquary and scholar of Portuguese from Newcastle upon Tyne, England. He was decorated by Queen Maria II of Portugal for his services to Portuguese literature.

== Early life ==
Adamson, son of Lieutenant Cuthbert Adamson, R. N., and his second wife Mary, was born on 13 September 1787 at his father's house in Gateshead. He was educated at Newcastle Grammar School, and in 1803 went to Lisbon, to work in the office of his elder brother Blythman, a merchant in the city. He left Portugal for England in 1807, when a French invasion threatened. While there, he had studied the language and collected a few books, including the tragedy of Dona Ignez de Castro, which he translated and printed in 1808.

== Return to England ==
On his return to England Adamson was articled to Thomas Davidson, a Newcastle solicitor and clerk of the peace for Northumberland, to whom Adamson later dedicated his Memoirs of Camoens. In 1810 he printed a small collection of sonnets, mostly translations from minor works of Camoens. The next year he was appointed under-sheriff of Newcastle, a post he retained until the passing of the Municipal Corporations Act 1835. He became a member of the Literary and Philosophical Society of Newcastle about this time, and was one of its secretaries from 1825 to his death. He was one of the founders of the Antiquarian Society of Newcastle in 1813, and was appointed secretary with the Rev. J. Hodgson. With several other enthusiasts he also founded the Typographical Society of Newcastle, which published most of his works.

== Portuguese literature ==
In 1820 Adamson's two-volume Memoirs of Camoens was published by Longmans. It was well received, with Robert Southey in the Quarterly Review of April 1822 speaking warmly in its favour. The two volumes contain a biography of the poet, a note on the "rimas" or smaller poems, a translation of an essay by Dom Joze Maria de Souza, an account of the translations and translators of the Lusiad, an account of the editions of Camoens, and notes on his commentators and apologists.

In 1836 Adamson printed a catalogue of his Portuguese library entitled Bibliotheca Lusitana, incorporating much bibliographical information. Except for volumes relating to Camoens and a few others, the library was destroyed by fire in 1849.

In 1842, Adamson brought out the first part of a collection entitled Lusitania Illustrata consisting of translations from Portuguese sonnets, with notes on their writers. This was followed in 1846 by a second part devoted to ballads. For these, Adamson produced an English prose version, which was then turned into verse by Richard Charles Coxe, vicar of Newcastle upon Tyne.

As a reward for his services to Portuguese literature, Maria II, Queen of Portugal, conferred the knighthoods of Christ and of the Tower and Sword on Adamson. He was a fellow of the Society of Antiquaries of London, and a member of many English and continental philosophical and antiquarian bodies.

== Other activities ==
Adamson took an interest in coins and produced the catalogue of the Hexham Hoard after its discovery in 1833. He was also interested in shells, publishing in 1823, his Conchological Tables. His private collection, later sold, contained 3,000 different species. He also collected fossils and minerals; the former he presented to the museum at Newcastle and the latter to the University of Durham.

Adamson was a close friend of Thomas Dibdin, the antiquary and bibliophile.

Aside from his work as a solicitor, Adamson served as secretary of the Newcastle and Carlisle Railway Company.

== Death ==
John Adamson died on 27 September 1855 and was buried at Jesmond Cemetery, near Newcastle.
