= Pingsdorf ware =

Historic earthenware style

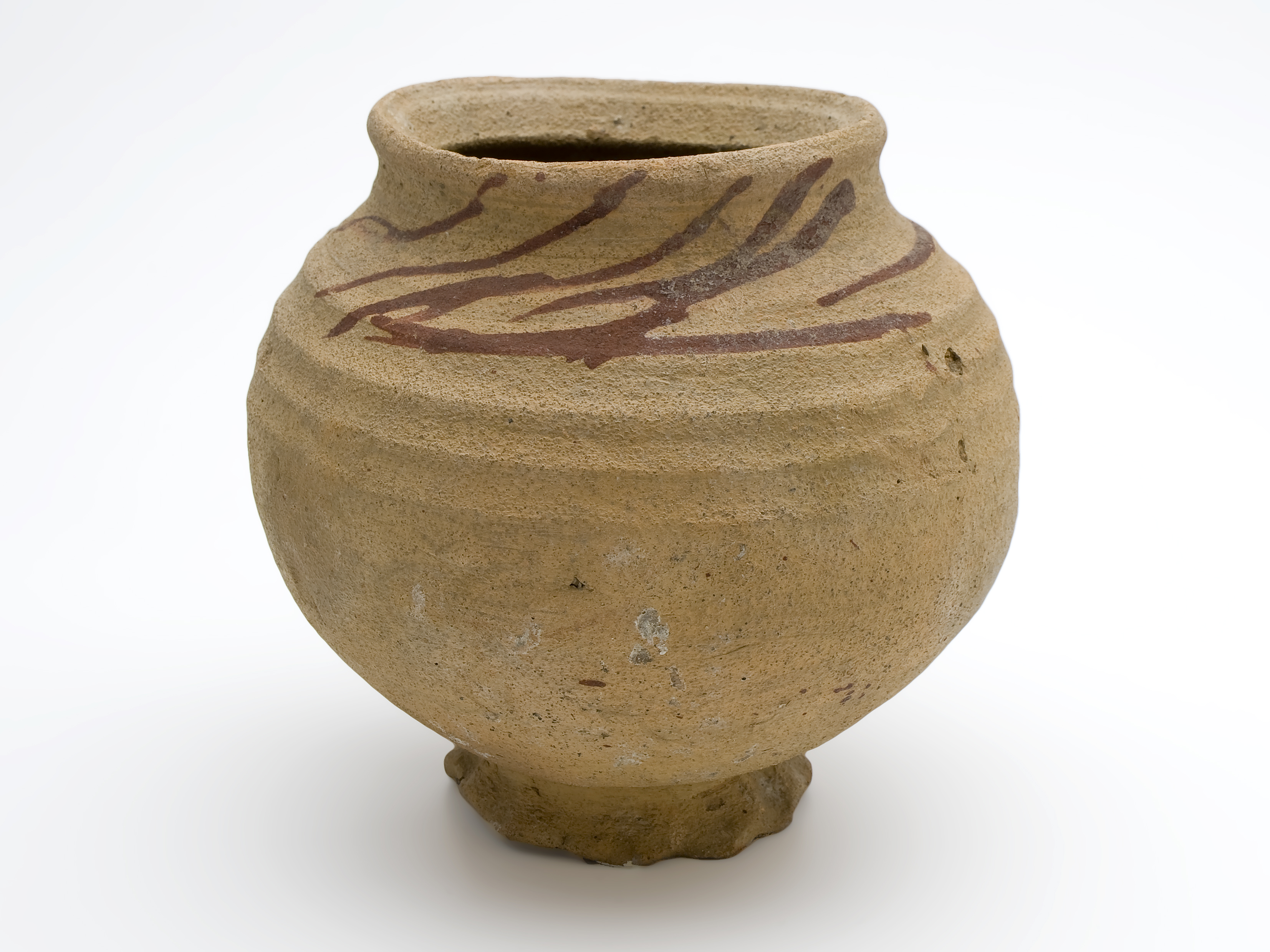
Pingsdorf vessel, 1100-1300

Pingsdorf ware is a high fired earthenware, or proto-stoneware, that was produced between the late 9th and 13th century in different pottery centres on the Eastern margin of the Rhineland as well as the Lower Rhine region. Characteristic features of vessels in Pingsdorf ware are a yellow-coloured fine sand-tempered sherd and a red painting. It is archaeologically evident within various Medieval settlements of North Western Europe and thus represents an important chronological marker for the Medieval archaeology.

It was a forerunner of the first European stoneware, produced in the same region and exported to much of Europe for the rest of the Middle Ages and Renaissance.

== Places of manufacture ==
Known places of manufacture of Pingsdorf ware and related pottery wares along the promontory beam besides Pingsdorf are various places near Brühl (e.g. Badorf and Walberberg) also Liblar, Wildenrath, Langerwehe and Jüngersdorf, Meckenheim as well as Urbar. Pingsdorf ware was also produced in Siegburg during its earliest period of production. In this regard, especially for the Lower Rhine Region Brunssum is of importance.

Along the promontory beam of the Rhineland low iron clays can be found which are excellent for the production of ceramic vessels. These clay deposits are in connection to the brown coal field of the Rhineland. Despite the exposures along the promontory beam, these clays are also outcropped on the geological zones of disruption on the Lower Rhine Region. In addition to the availability of appropriate clays, the availability of fuel (forest) as well as the accessibility to trading routes was essential to the development of a successful place of pottery manufacture in the Middle Ages.

== Typology and distribution ==
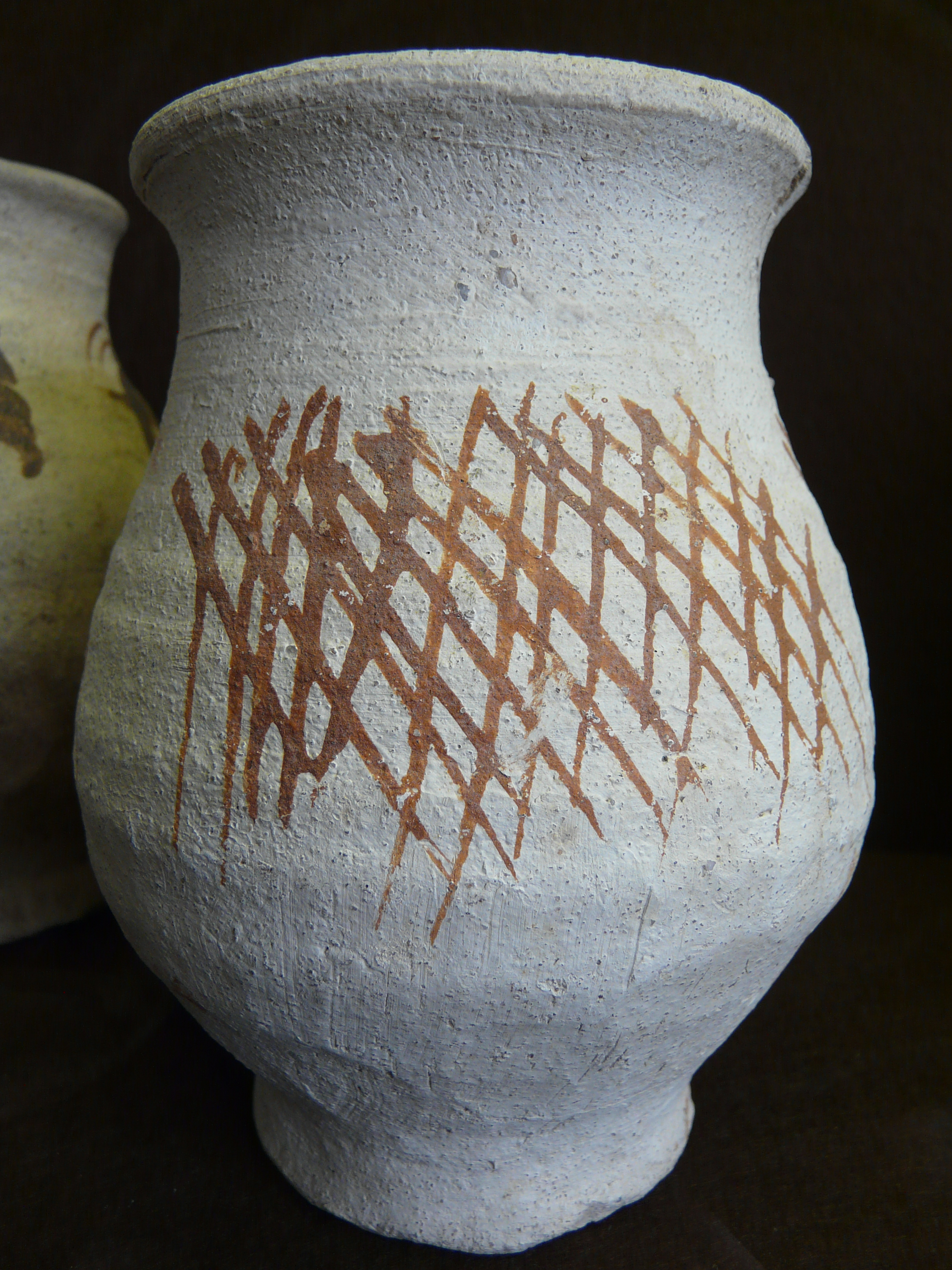
Pingsdorf Ware (12th century), Burg Linn, Krefeld.

During the early Middle Ages Badorf Ware was produced within the promontory of the Rhineland. A painted type of Badorf Ware was developed from the originally plain and pale promontory ware which was decorated by using a roller handstamp. This painted Badorf Ware is divided into a group of Hunenschans Ware which is decorated by use of a roller handstamp and partly features a fine-sand temper, and a second group of late Carolingina Ware with red finger stroke painting which still exhibits a chalky surface.

The Pingsdorf Ware represents a further development of the painted Badorf Ware which becomes established as an independent group from the late 9th century. It is characterised by a sandpaperlike surface which was achieved by its temper with fine sand. Within this group bellied pots and beakers as well as jugs and early types of stove tiles are prevalent. The early types of Pingsdorf ware vessels still feature a lensoid bottom, which is now stabilised by a wavy foot.

Within its nearly 400-years of existence in which Pingsdorf ware was produced, the variety of ceramic types did not experience any considerable change. Until now there are only a few stratified finds which could ascertain a detailed chronology. Nevertheless, in general a development form pale vessels with a smooth surface to more high fired, darker serrated vessels is noticeable, which are displaced by vessels with clearly more carved out external rotational grooves. This change to serrated types was conducted during the late 12th century. Until now a periodic change could not be proven only on foundation of its painting. Red patterns of brush strokes are evident within all periods of Pingsdorf ware. Patterns of grids are by tendency a development of the 12th century onwards. The red painting is gradually abandoned during the late period on the end of the 12th century.

Around 1200, shortly before Pingsdorf ware passes out of use, the variety of pottery types experiences an addition by jugs and jars of a cylindric shaped neck. Vessels of the Pingsdorf Ware were traded by the Rhine trade route up to England, Scotland, Scandinavia and the Netherlands. As a high fired earthenware it was the appropriate transport vessel for goods of the Rineland. On the upstreams of the Rhine, Pingsdorf Ware was less common.

Controversially discussed is the classification of an in 1949 found canteen from Zelzate, which was burrowed together with a Carolingian coin hoard. Within the literature this find is usually referred to be the oldest dated vessel of the Pingsdorf Ware range. By now the canteen of Zelzate is attributed to the painted Carolingian pottery of the Baldorf type. In general, a coin hoard vessel from Wermelskirchen, dating to 960, is referred to be the oldest vessel of the Pingsdorf Ware with an absolute date.

== Research history ==
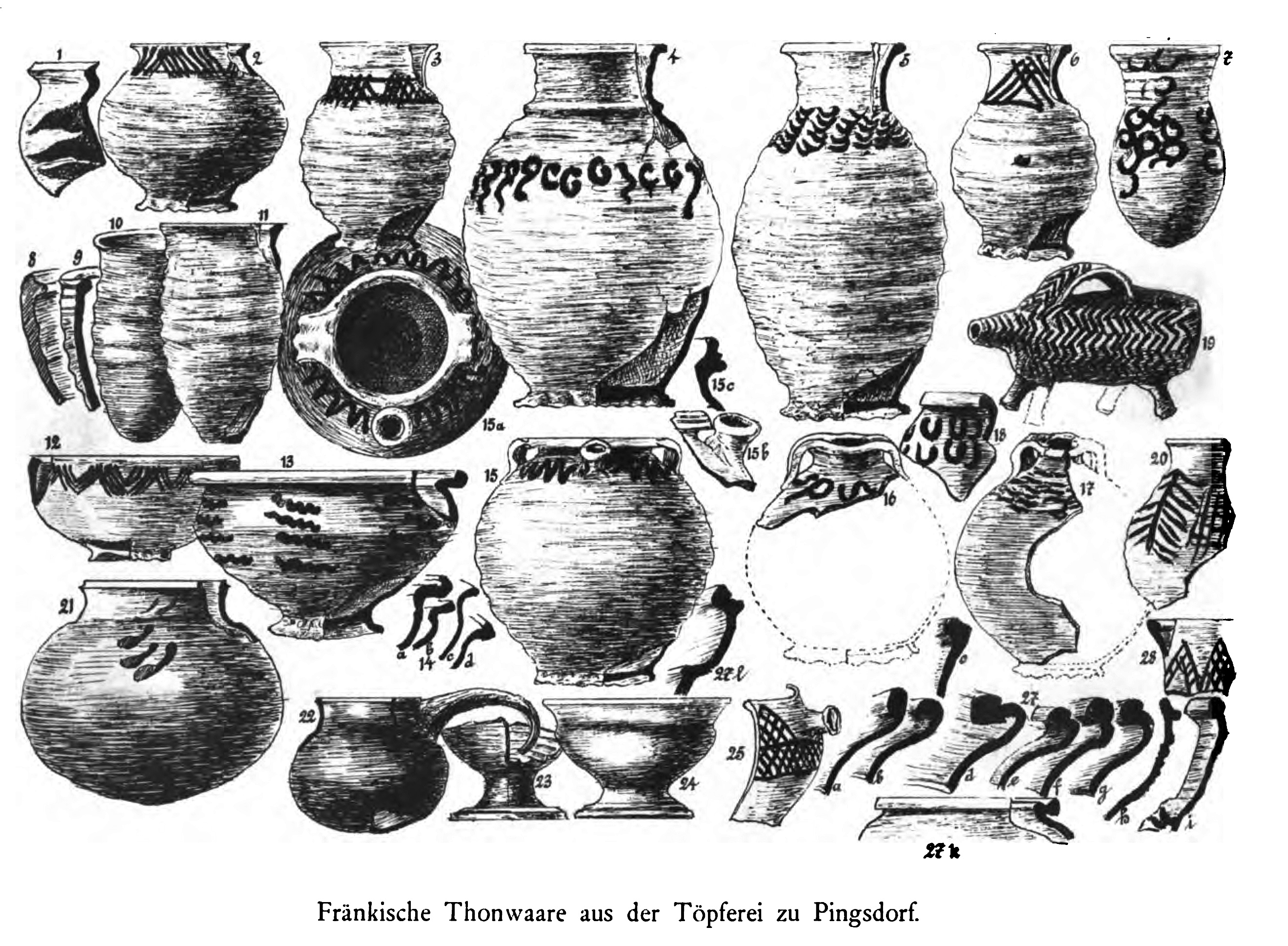
Varieties of Pingsdorf ware according to Koenen 1898

First scientific attention to Pingsdorf Ware was dealt by Constantin Koenen. 1889 Koenen conducted a first systematic excavation on a pottery complex in the courtyard of the Kleins Inn in Brühl-Pingsdorf. Withal, he analysed an 80 m^{3} sherd store, which comprised approximately a dozen different pottery forms. The publication of this excavation in the Bonner Jahrbücher displays until today the most complete overview of the variety of pottery types of the Pingsdorf Ware. In 1927, Franz Rademacher published an approach to a chronology of the medieval pottery that was based on an art historical analysis of the pottery ware. He ascribed the red-painted Pingsdorf Ware into the Carolingian time, whereas he distinguished these from the pottery vessels of the Ottonian Period. In the 1930s, archaeological analyses on Dutch medieval settlements relativised the art historical approach of Rademacher. Wouter C. Braat was referring to a development of the Pingsdorf Ware in succession of the Hunenschans Ware and assumed a constitution of the Pingsdorf Ware around 900. Furthermore, Braat postulated its expire around 1200.

Of further importance for the chronological attribution of the Pingsdorf Ware was the stratigraphy of the stream bed of the systematic excavations conducted at the Viking settlement of Hedeby on the Schlei from 1930 until 1939. Whilst the Badorf Ware is still present on the latest horizons of the find spot, it expires shortly around or after 900 and gets replaced by Pingsdorf Ware, which is archaeologically evident until the 13th century. However, an exact chronology of single types of vessels was not possible on foundation of the material found at Hedeby.

In the aftermath there are various individual publication on different find spots. In 1975 Beckmann published a seriation on the finds from the Aulgasse in Siegburg. However, he only focussed on vessels that were found in a complete condition during the excavation. In 2002, for the first time, Markus Sanke published an overview of the variety of pottery of the Pingsdorf Ware that was independent from the find spot.

== Bibliography ==
- Kurt Böhner: Frühmittelalterliche Töpferöfen in Walberberg und Pingsdorf. In: Bonner Jahrbücher 155/156, 1956, 372–385.
- Reinhard Friedrich: Eine chronologisch bedeutsame Bechergruppe der Pingsdorfer Ware. In: David Gaimster, Mark Redknap, Hans-Helmut Wegner: Zur Keramik des Mittelalters und der beginnenden Neuzeit im Rheinland. Medieval and later pottery from the Rhineland and his markets. BAR International Series 440, Oxford 1988, 271-297.
- Reinhard Friedrich: Mittelalterliche Keramik aus rheinischen Motten. Rheinische Ausgrabungen Band 44. Köln 2002, 213-227.
- Andreas Heege: Die Keramik des frühen und hohen Mittelalters aus dem Rheinland. Holos, Bonn 1995, 82ff.
- Wolfgang Hübener: Zur Ausbreitung einiger fränkischer Keramikgruppen nach Nord- und Mitteleuropa im 9.–12. Jahrhundert. In: Archaeologia Geographica Band 2, Hamburg 1951, 105ff.
- Wolfgang Hübener: Die Keramik von Haithabu. Ausgrabungen in Haithabu 2, Neumünster 1959.
- Walter Janssen: Produktionsbezirk mittelalterlicher Keramik in Brühl-Pingsdorf. Rheinische Ausgrabungen 76. Köln 1977, 133-138.
- Walter Janssen: Die Importkeramik von Haithabu. Ausgrabungen in Haithabu 9. Neumünster 1987.
- Constantin Koenen: Karlingisch-fränkische Töpfereien bei Pingsdorf. In: Bonner Jahrbücher 103, 1898, 115–122.
- Uwe Lobbedey: Untersuchungen mittelalterlicher Keramik vornehmlich aus Südwestdeutschland. Arbeiten zur Frühmittelalterforschung 3. Berlin 1968.
- Hartwig Lüdtke: Die mittelalterliche Keramik von Schleswig. Ausgrabungen Schild 1971–1975. Ausgrabungen in Schleswig. Berichte und Studien 4. Neumünster 1985, 60ff.
- Hartwig Lüdtke: The Bryggen Pottery. Introduction and Pingsdorf Ware. The Bryggen Papers Band 4. Oslo, 1989.
- Markus Sanke: Gelbe Irdenware. In: Hartwig Lüdtke, Kurt Schietzel (Hrsg.): Handbuch zur mittelalterlichen Keramik in Nordeuropa. Schriften des Archäologischen Landesmuseums Schleswig 6, Neumünster 2001, 271–428.
- Markus Sanke: Die mittelalterliche Keramikproduktion in Brühl-Pingsdorf. Technologie - Typologie - Chronologie. (= Rheinische Ausgrabungen 50). Zabern, Mainz 2002, ISBN 3-8053-2878-8.
