= Styca =

Early medieval coin

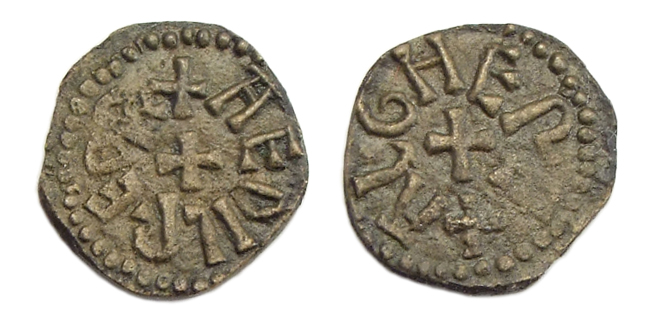
A styca of Æthelred II of Northumbria

The styca (pronounced [ˈstykɑ]; pl. stycas) was a small coin minted in pre-Viking Northumbria, originally in base silver and subsequently in a copper alloy. Production began in the 790s and continued until the 850s, though the coin remained in circulation until the Viking conquest of Northumbria in 867.

== Etymology ==
The coin's name derives from Old English styċċe [ˈstyttʃe], meaning "piece."

== History ==
Stycas were first minted in the reign of Æthelred I of Northumbria (790–796), replacing the earlier sceat which ceased production in c. 790. They were initially made from a debased alloy of silver, and from c. 830 until c. 835 they were also minted in a copper alloy. Production switched over entirely to copper in c. 837 and lasted until c. 855. Production ceased at this time, though the coin remained in circulation until the Viking conquest of Northumbria in 867. Stycas were unique to Northumbria; from the late eighth century onwards the other Anglo-Saxon kingdoms minted only silver pennies based on the Frankish denier. The vast number of copper stycas which are known to exist indicates that production from the 830s onwards was both intensive and constant. The large quantity of stycas produced, combined with the fact that large numbers of stycas are clearly of unofficial creation, might suggest a reason as to why production was halted in the reign of Osberht of Northumbria.

== Design ==
With a few exceptions, the various issues of stycas share a common design standard. Typically the name of the issuing king (or archbishop) appears on one side surrounding a central motif, and the name of the moneyer who made the coin appears on the other side. Common central motifs include simple cruciform designs and rings of annulets. Exceptions include those stycas made by the moneyer Leofdegn during the reign of Æthelred II of Northumbria. These stycas feature much more elaborate designs including complex central cruciform devices and one issue in particular features both a hound and a triquetra on the same side.

== Hoards ==
Hoards that consist of stycas, or where stycas are part of the assemblage, include:

- Bolton Percy hoard
- Hexham Hoard
- Kirkoswald Hoard
- St Leonard's Place hoard
- Talnotrie Hoard

== See also ==
- Elizabeth Pirie
- Wigmund (archbishop of York)

== Bibliography ==
- Davies, Glyn (1 September 2010). History of Money. University of Wales Press. ISBN 978-0-7083-2379-3.
- Skingley, Philip, ed. (2014). Coins of England & the United Kingdom: Standard Catalogue of British Coins 2015. Spink & Sons Ltd. ISBN 978-1-907427-43-5.
- Cook, Barrie J.; Williams, Gareth; Archibald, Marion (2006). Coinage And History in the North Sea World, C. AD 500–1250: Essays in Honour of Marion Archibald. BRILL. ISBN 90-04-14777-2.
