= Talnotrie hoard =

9th-century mixed hoard in Scotland

Talnotrie Hoard
- Created: c. 875–900AD
- Period/culture: Early medieval
- Discovered: 1912; Talnotrie, Scotland
- Discovered by: Mrs Gordon
- Present location: National Museums Scotland
- Coordinates: 55°00′56″N 04°22′00″W

The Talnotrie hoard is a 9th-century mixed hoard of jewellery, coinage, metal-working objects and raw materials found in Talnotrie, Scotland, in 1912. Initially assumed to have belonged to a Northumbrian metal-worker, more recent interpretations associate its deposition with the activities of the Viking Great Army.

== Discovery ==
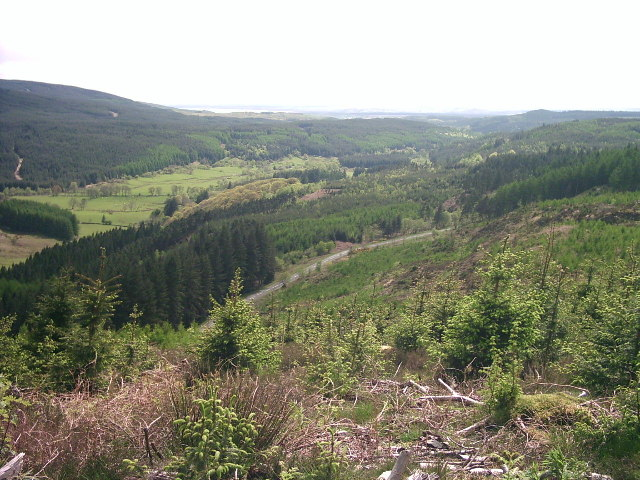
View from Talnotrie Hill (2005), the area where the hoard was found

The hoard was discovered at Talnotrie in Kirkcudbrightshire, when a woman called Mrs Gordon was putting peat on the fire in her home and noticed some silver drop out from the peat. Her husband had cut the peat from the hillside near their home and later reported that the objects were in peat layers close to the "glacial clay below the peat". The hoard was published by Sir Herbert Maxwell in 1913.

== Contents ==
The hoard consists of a mixed assemblage of coins, jewellery, metal-working objects and raw materials. Jewellery items in the hoard include two silver disc-headed pins, a separate pin-head, a niello strap-end and a gold finger-ring. Objects associated with metal-working include a lead weight inset with a piece of circular copper-alloy interlace, two oval silver wire loops, and a fragment of or unfinished cross. Raw materials include a piece of jet, a piece of unfinished agate, a piece of green glass and a substance similar to beeswax. There are also three clay spindle whorls. Coins associated with the hoard include six stycas, four pennies of Burgred of Mercia, one fragment of a Carolingian denier and two fragments of Islamic dirhams.

== Acquisition and display ==
The hoard is in the collection of National Museums Scotland. In 2021 it was displayed as part of an exhibition on the Galloway Hoard.

== Interpretation ==
Whilst the identity of the hoard's depositor/s is unknown, James Graham-Campbell suggested that it belonged to a Northumbrian metal-worker. However, it has been suggested that the hoard is more likely to be connected to Scandinavian presence and movement in the British Isles, and could even be connected to the Viking Great Army since objects in the assemblage have similarities to the assemblages of sites like the Viking winter camp at Torksey in Lincolnshire. It has even been suggested that the hoard could be connected to Viking leaders, such as Halfdan Ragnarsson or Ivar the Boneless. Halfdan made incursions into Strathclyde and Pictish areas c.874/5. Ivar, and his kinsman Olaf, captured Dumbarton Rock and campaigned in Strathclyde c.870/1. It has also been cited as "the earliest coin-dated hoard evidence for bullion-use in Scotland", and the earliest appearance of Islamic dirham coins in Scotland.

The hoard's date of concealment has been estimated based on the coins in the assemblage. The proposed dates vary from c.875 to c.900. The decorative motifs on the pins have been interpreted as part of a "distinctly Northumbrian development of the Trewhiddle style".

== Gallery ==
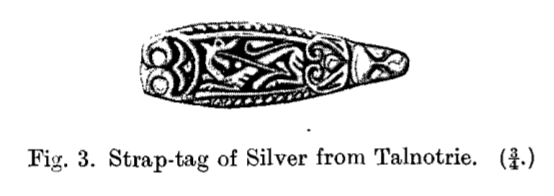
Illustration of niello strap-end from the hoard (1913)

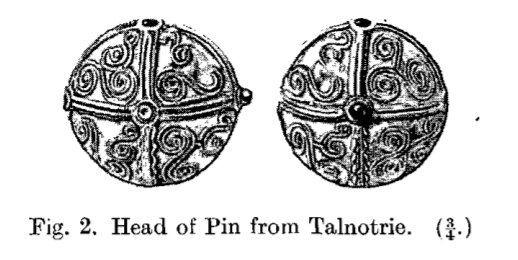
Illustration of pin heads (1913)

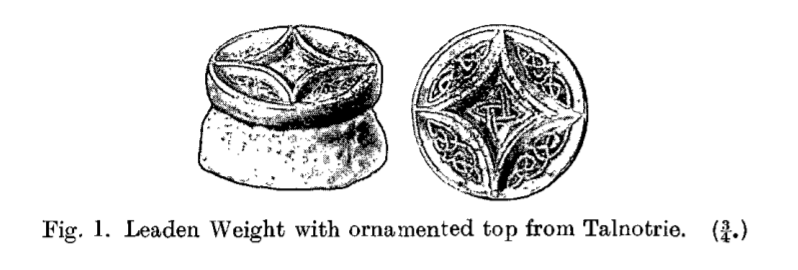
Illustration of inlaid lead weight (1913)

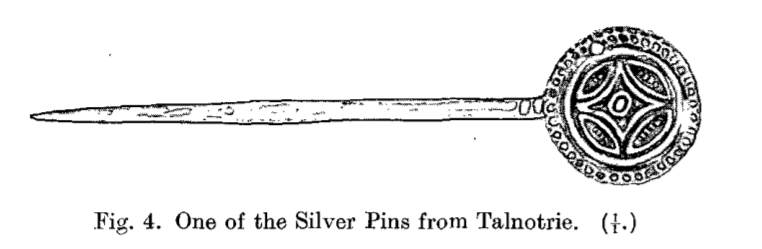
Illustration of one of the pair of pins (1913)
