= Wulfhere of York =

Archbishop of York from 854 to 900

Wulfhere
- Archbishop of York
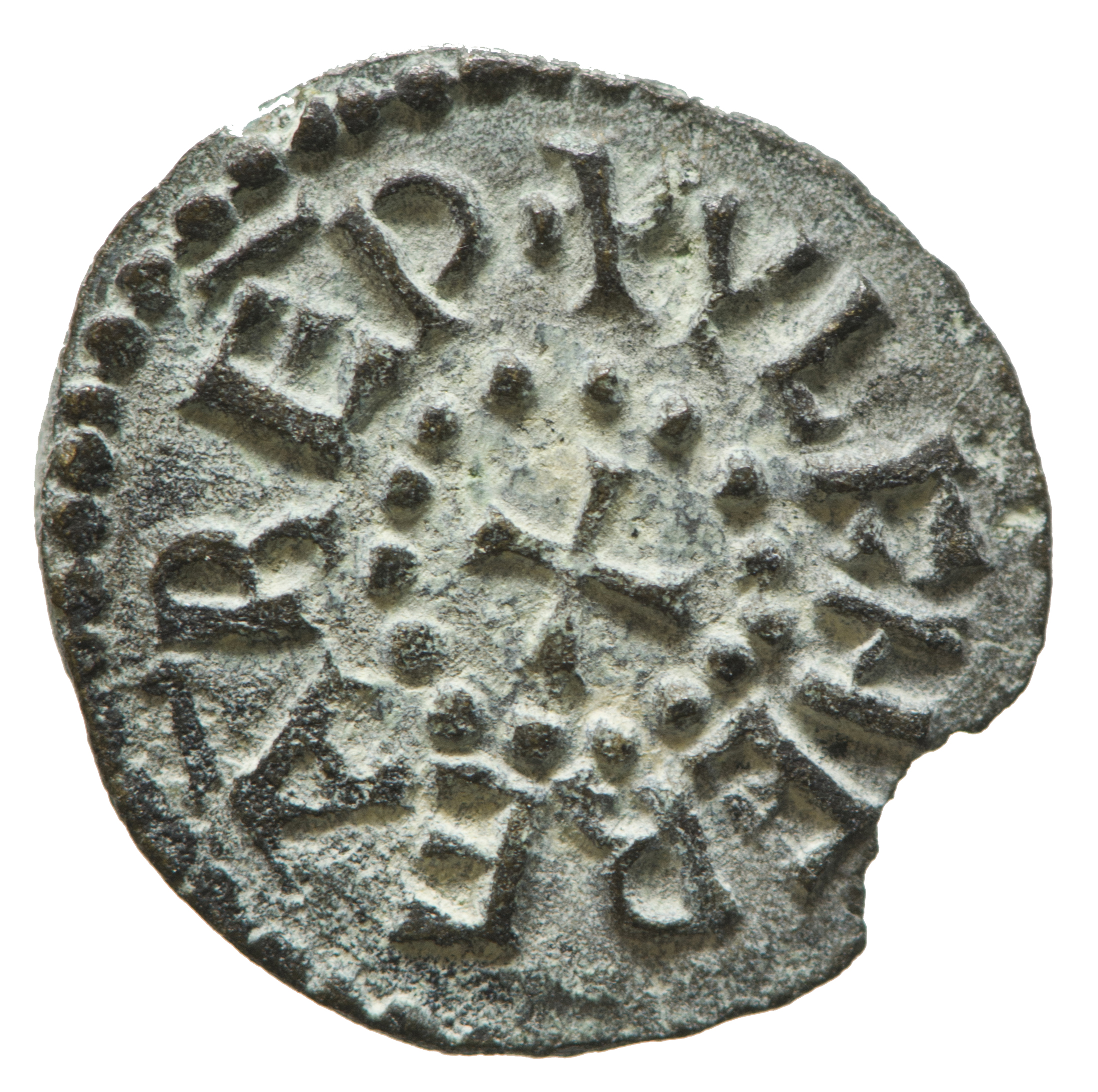
- Copper styca of Wulfhere
- Appointed: 854
- Term ended: 892 or 900
- Predecessor: Wigmund
- Successor: Æthelbald

Orders
- Consecration: 854

Personal details
- Born: Wulfhere
- Died: 892 or 900

Wulfhere (died c. 900) was Archbishop of York between 854 and 900.

== Life ==
Wulfhere was consecrated in 854.

In 866 the viking Great Heathen Army attacked and captured York, and the following year the "Danes" (as the English called vikings in general at the time) defeated an attempt to recapture the city, by Anglo-Saxon forces, the following year. Wulfhere made peace with the invaders and stayed in York.

When, in 872, Northumbrians rebelled against the Danes and their collaborators, and Wulfhere fled York. Eventually he found refuge with King Burgred of Mercia.

Wulfhere was recalled in 873, and continued in York until his death in 892 or 900. After his death, the seat remained vacant for eight years.

== Coinage ==
Like previous archbishops of York, Wulfhere issued styca coins; Wulfred was his moneyer.

== Citations ==
Christian titles
Preceded by Wigmund	Archbishop of York; 854–c. 900	Succeeded by Æthelbald
