= Elizabeth Pirie =

British numismatist

Elizabeth Jane Elphinstone Pirie FSA
- Born: 14 September 1932; Malta
- Died: 1 March 2005 (aged 72); Edinburgh
- Education: University of Edinburgh
- Parents: Rev James E Pirie (father); Ethel Stewart (mother)

Elizabeth Jean Elphinstone Pirie (14 September 1932 – 1 March 2005) was a British numismatist specialising in ninth-century Northumbrian coinage, and museum curator, latterly as Keeper of Archaeology at Leeds City Museum from 1960 to 1991. She wrote eight books and dozens of articles throughout her career. She was a fellow of the Royal Numismatic Society, president of the Yorkshire Numismatic Society and a fellow of the Society of Antiquaries of London.

== Early life ==
Pirie was born in Malta on 14 September 1932, whilst her father was serving there as a Royal Naval Chaplain. She returned to Britain with her mother, shortly before the outbreak of the Second World War. Until her father's retirement in 1953, the family moved several times, and Pirie attended 8 schools. After an MA degree at University of Edinburgh and an archaeology diploma at Cambridge, in 1952 she started work on several archaeological excavations. This worked continued until 1955, when she took up a post at Grosvenor Museum, Chester.

== Career ==
Pirie was appointed Assistant Curator at the Grosvenor Museum in 1955. Here she was responsible for the display in 1956 of Dr Willoughby Gardner's collection of coins from the Chester mint (facility). In March 1957 she moved to Maidstone Museum as Archaeological Assistant. In 1960 she became Keeper of Archaeology at Leeds City Museum, a post she held until her retirement in 1991. Most of her books and articles were written during this time. During her time at Leeds she led several excavations, including the Cistercian ware kiln at Potterton, near in Barwick-in-Elmet with Philip Mayes.

Pirie became the foremost expert on styca coinage and her volume Coins of the Kingdom of Northumbria "provides an indispensable illustrated corpus of the known material".

== Later life ==
Pirie retired to Edinburgh in 1991 and bought a flat in Marchmont. She was active in her local church, continued her research and campaigned on local issues. She died on 1 March 2005 and her cremation was held on 11 March at Mortonhall Crematorium.

== Honours ==
- Fellow of the Royal Numismatic Society, 1957
- Vice-president of the Yorkshire Numismatic Society & BANS Delegate, 1968
- President of the Yorkshire Numismatic Society, 1970
- Fellow of the Society of Antiquaries of London, 1978

== Publications ==
=== Books ===
- Pirie, Elizabeth (1964). Sylloge of Coins of the British Isles 5: Grosvenor Museum, Chester – Part 1, The Willoughby Gardner Collection of Coins with the Chester mint-signature. London: Oxford University Press. ISBN 0197258972.
- Pirie, Elizabeth (1975). Sylloge of Coins of the British Isles 21: Coins in Yorkshire Collections – Coins from Northumbrian Mints c895-1279. London: Oxford University Press. ISBN 0197259391.
- Catalogue of the Early Northumbrian Coins in the Museum of Antiquities, Newcastle upon Tyne. Newcastle: University of Newcastle upon Tyne. 1982.
- Pirie, Elizabeth (1994). The York Hoard, 1831. Llanfyllin: Galata Print. ISBN 0951667122.
- Coins of the Kingdom of Northumbria c.700–867. Llanfyllin. 1996.
- Pirie, Elizabeth (2000). Thrymsas, Sceattas and Stycas of Northumbria: an Inventory of Finds recorded to 1997. Llanfyllin: Galata Print. ISBN 0951667165.
- Pirie, Elizabeth (1996). Coins of Northumbria: an illustrated guide to money from the years 670 to 867. Llanfyllin: Galata Print. ISBN 0951667149.

=== Articles ===
- 'A Coin Certainly of Leicester but with a mint signature of Chester', with R H M Dolley, Numismatic Circular 70.9
- 'The Repurcussions on Chester's Prosperity of the Viking Descent on Cheshire in 980', with R H M Dolley, British Numismatic Journal 33
- 'Coins of the Chester Mint', Transactions of the Yorkshire Numismatic Society 2
- 'A Further Note on Coins from the Bishophill (York) find of 1882', Annual Report of the Yorkshire Philosophical Society (1971)
- 'Early Norman Coins in the Yorkshire Museum', Annual Report of the Yorkshire Philosophical Society (1972)
- 'Numismatics and Conservation: a numismatic view', Museums Journal 79.1
- 'Early Northumbrian coins at auction, 1981', British Numismatic Journal 51
- 'Coins', in P Mayes & L Butler, Sandal Castle Excavations 1964–73
- ' The Ripon Hoard, 1695: Contemporary and Current Interest', British Numismatic Journal 52
- 'Eanred's Penny: a Northumbrian enigma', The Yorkshire Numismatist 3
- 'The Bamburgh Hoard of Ninth-Century Northumbrian Coins', Archaeologia Aeliana 33

== See also ==
- Hexham Hoard
- St Leonard's Place Hoard
- Styca
- Leeds Museums & Galleries
