= Æthelred II of Northumbria =

9th-century king of Northumbria

Æthelred II
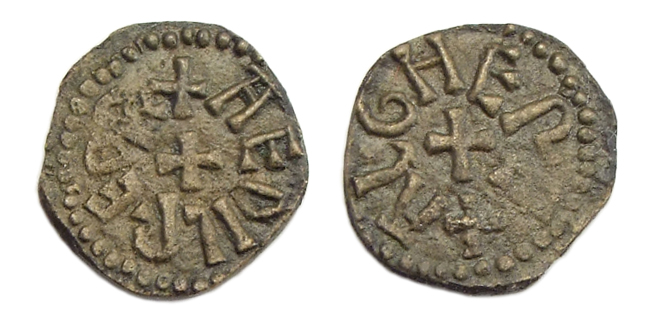
- AE Styca of Æethelred II

King of Northumbria
- Reign: c. 840 – c. 848 or c. 858 – 862 AD
- Predecessor: Rædwulf
- Successor: Osberht

King of Northumbria
- Reign: c. 854 – 858 AD
- Predecessor: Eanred
- Successor: Rædwulf
- Died: c. 862
- House: Northumbria
- Father: Eanred

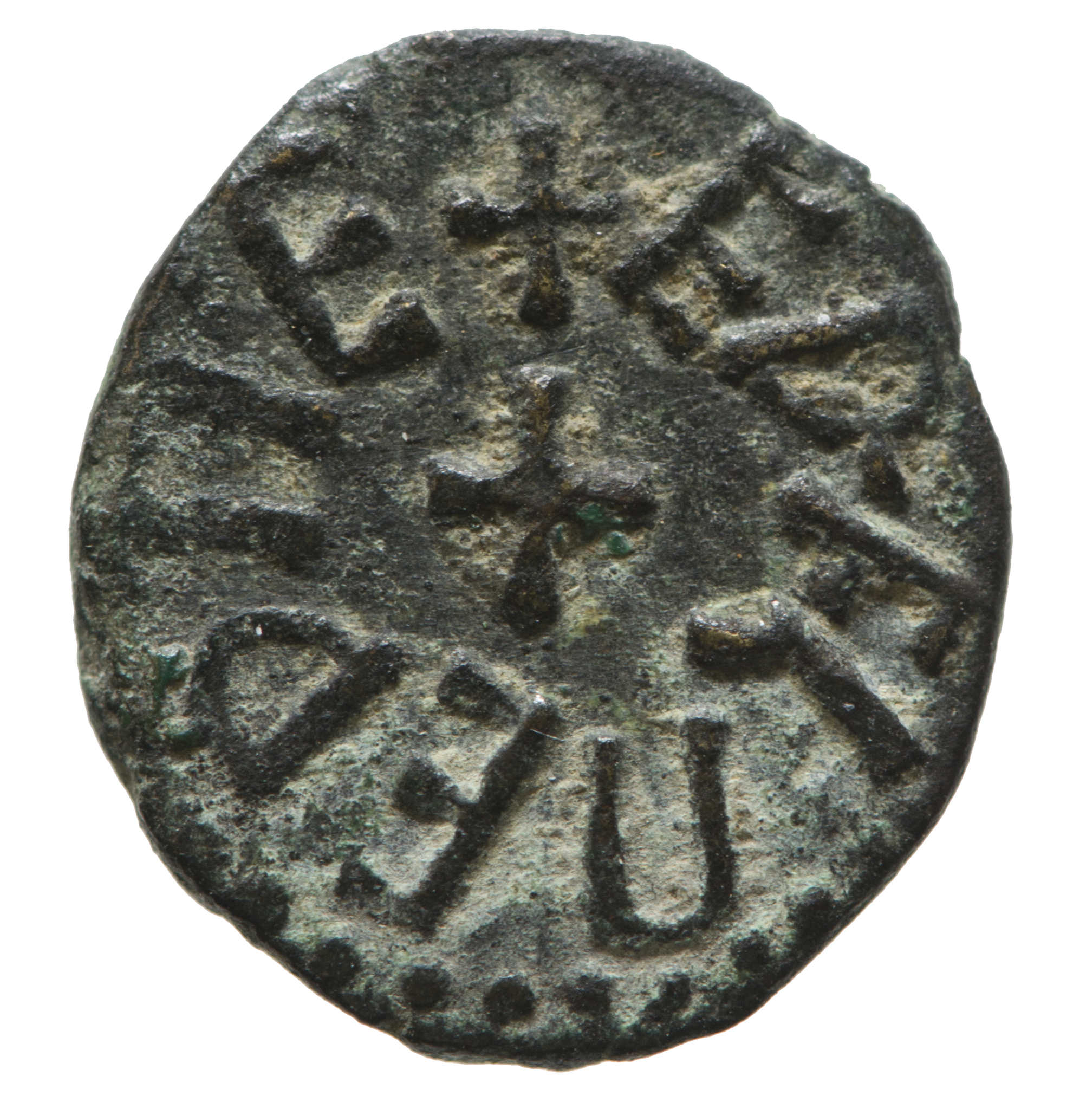
Copper alloy styca of King Aethelred II

Æthelred II was king of Northumbria in the middle of the ninth century, but his dates are uncertain. N. J. Higham gives 840 to 848, when he was killed, with an interruption in 844 when Rædwulf usurped the throne, but was killed the same year fighting against the Vikings. Barbara Yorke agrees, and adds that Æthelred was the son of his predecessor, Eanred, but dates his death 848 or 849. D. P. Kirby thinks that an accession date of 844 is more likely, but notes that a coin of Eanred dated stylistically no earlier than 850 may require a more radical revision of dates. David Rollason accepts the coin evidence, and dates Æthelred's reign from c. 854 to c. 862, with Rædwulf's usurpation in 858.

Relatively little is known of his reign from the surviving documentary record. He appears to have been expelled in favour of Rædwulf, whose reign is confirmed by the evidence of coinage. However, Rædwulf was killed the same year, fighting against Vikings, and Æthelred was restored to power. He was assassinated a few years later, but no further details are known of his murder.

The new styca coinage, small brass coins containing very little silver and much zinc, which began in his father's reign, continued in Æthelred's. Large numbers of his styca coins have been found, again minted in York by a number of moneyers. A moneyer active in this period named Eardwulf was sometimes confused with Æthelred's grandfather King Eardwulf in older works on numismatics.

Written and numismatic evidence agrees that Æthelred was succeeded by Osberht.

== Bibliography ==
- Higham, N.J., The Kingdom of Northumbria AD 350–1100. Stroud: Sutton, 1993. ISBN 0-86299-730-5
- Kirby, D. P. (2000). The Earliest English Kings (Revised ed.). London, UK: Routledge. ISBN 0-415-24211-8.
- Rollason, David (2004). "Eardwulf (fl. 796–c.830), king of Northumbria". Oxford Dictionary of National Biography. Oxford University Press.
- Yorke, Barbara, Kings and Kingdoms of early Anglo-Saxon England. London: Seaby, 1990. ISBN 1-85264-027-8
