= Wigmund (archbishop of York) =

Archbishop of York from 837 to 854

- Archbishop of York
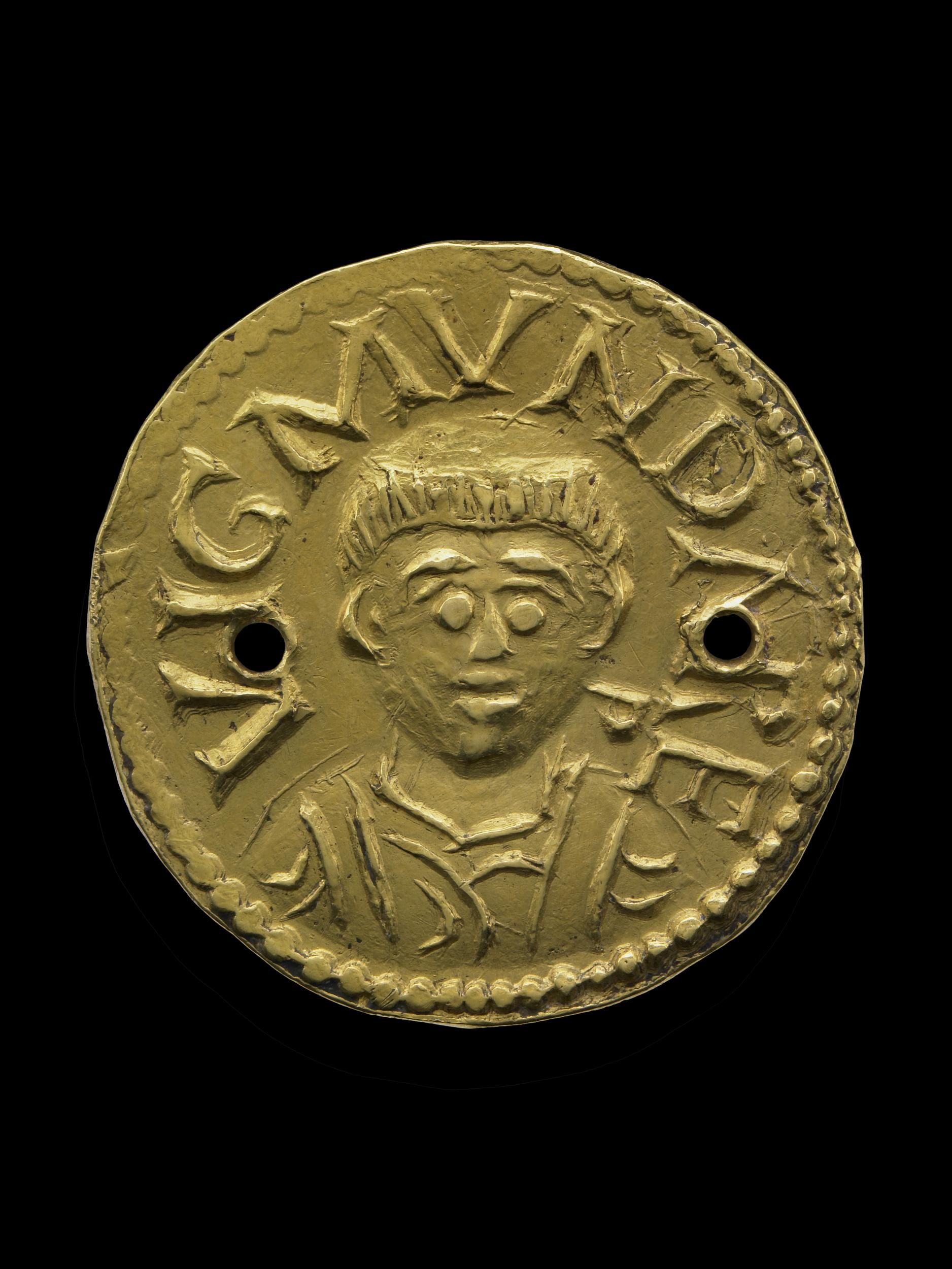
- Gold solidus of Wigmund
- Elected: 837
- Term ended: 854
- Predecessor: Wulfsige
- Successor: Wulfhere

Orders
- Consecration: 837

Personal details
- Died: 854

Wigmund was a medieval Archbishop of York, who was consecrated in 837 and died in 854.

== Coinage ==
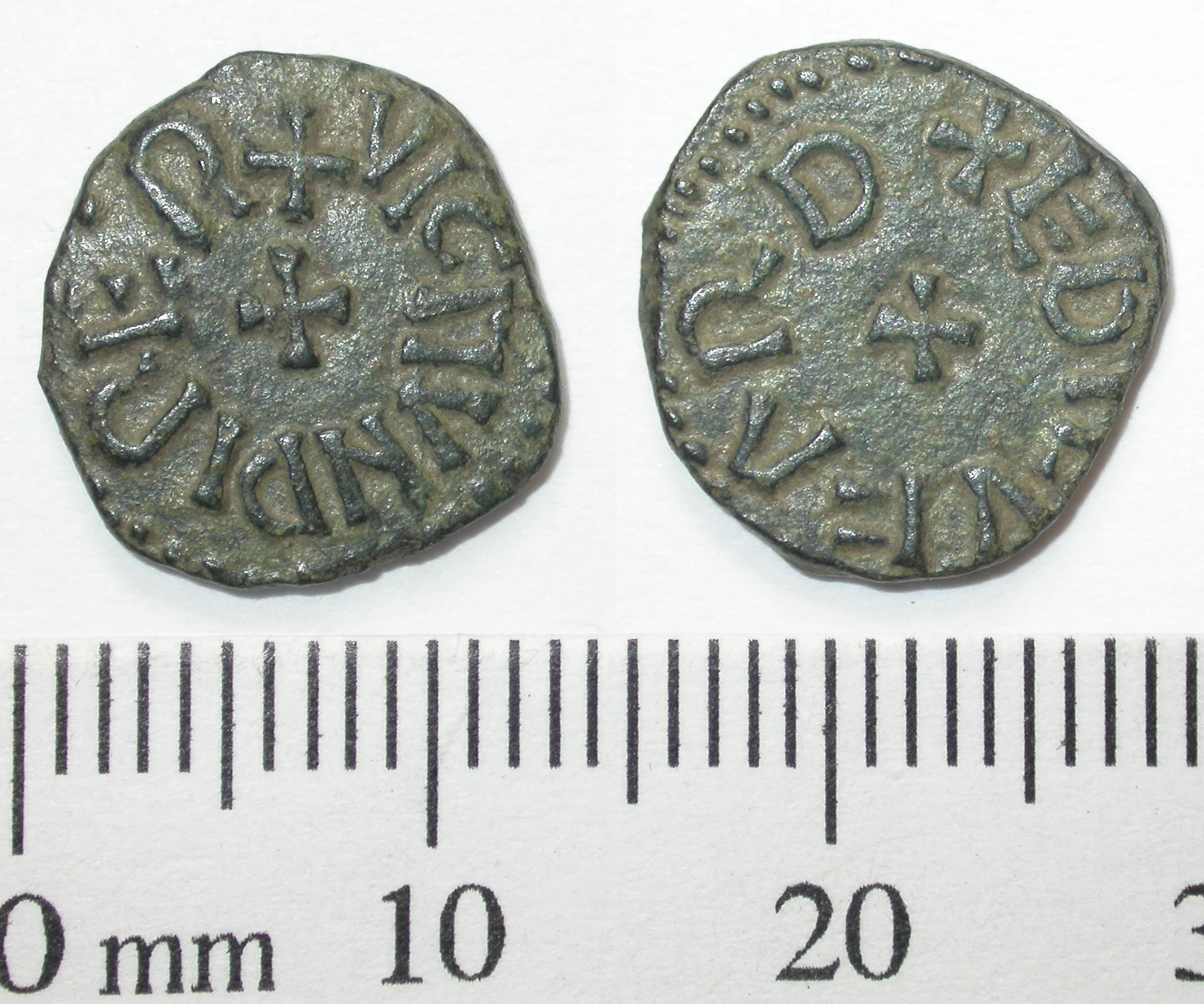
Styca of Wigmund: moneyer Edilveard

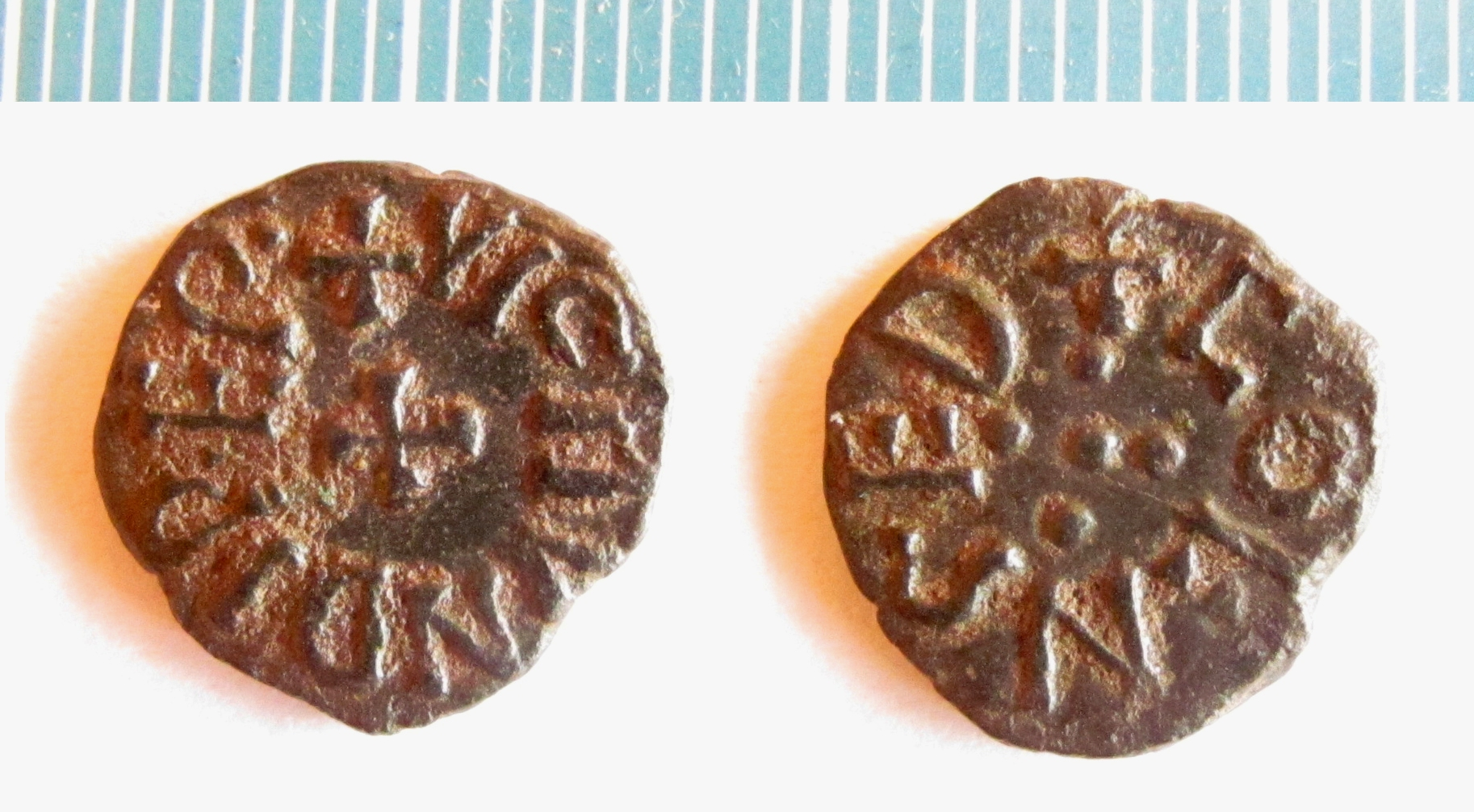
Styca of Wigmund: moneyer Coenred - found in Norfolk

During the ninth century, both kings of Northumbria and archbishops of York minted styca coinage. The historian Stewart Lyon estimated that Wigmund produced coinage from between 837 and 846. The coins issued by Wigmund were minted by a number of moneyers, including Aethelweard, Hunlaf and Coenred. Unique and separate from the copper-alloy, mass-produced stycas, is a gold solidus, produced by Wigmund potentially as an ecclesiastical gift.

== Citations ==
Christian titles
Preceded by Wulfsige	Archbishop of York; 837-854	Succeeded by Wulfhere
