= Rædwulf of Northumbria =

King of Northumbria

Rædwulf was king of Northumbria for a short time. His ancestry is not known, but it is possible that he was a kinsman of Osberht and Ælla.

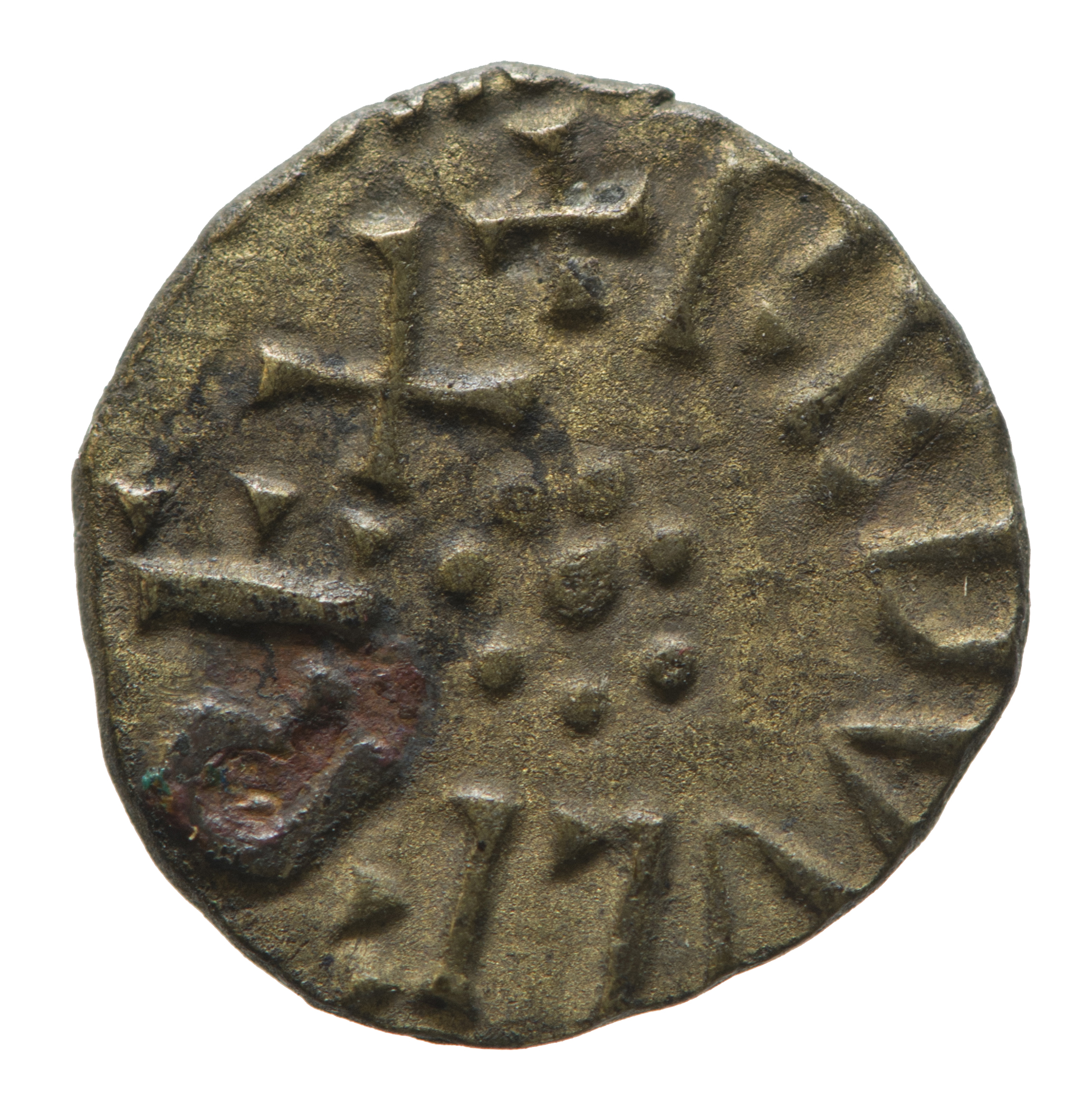
Copper alloy of styca of King Raedwulf

Rædwulf became king when Æthelred son of Eanred was deposed. Coins from his reign are known, but other than a report of his death fighting pagans (i.e., Vikings) in Roger of Wendover's Flores Historiarum, nothing more is recorded of him.

Annals incorporated in Flores Historiarum date this reign to 844, but the annalist's chronology is not necessarily reliable. The recent discovery of a coin of King Eanred, dated on stylistic grounds to circa 850, led to a reappraisal of the reigns of Northumbrian rulers in the 9th century. As a result, Rædwulf's reign is now thought to have been c. 858 rather than 844.

The numismatic and written evidence agrees that Æthelred was restored to the kingship after Rædwulf's death.

== Notes ==
Regnal titles
Preceded by Æthelred	King of Northumbria; 844 (as usurper) or c. 858 (as Æthelred's successor)	Succeeded by Æthelred (after 844) or Osberht (after 858)
