= Eanbald (fl. 798) =

Archbishop of York (died c. 808)

Eanbald II
- Archbishop of York
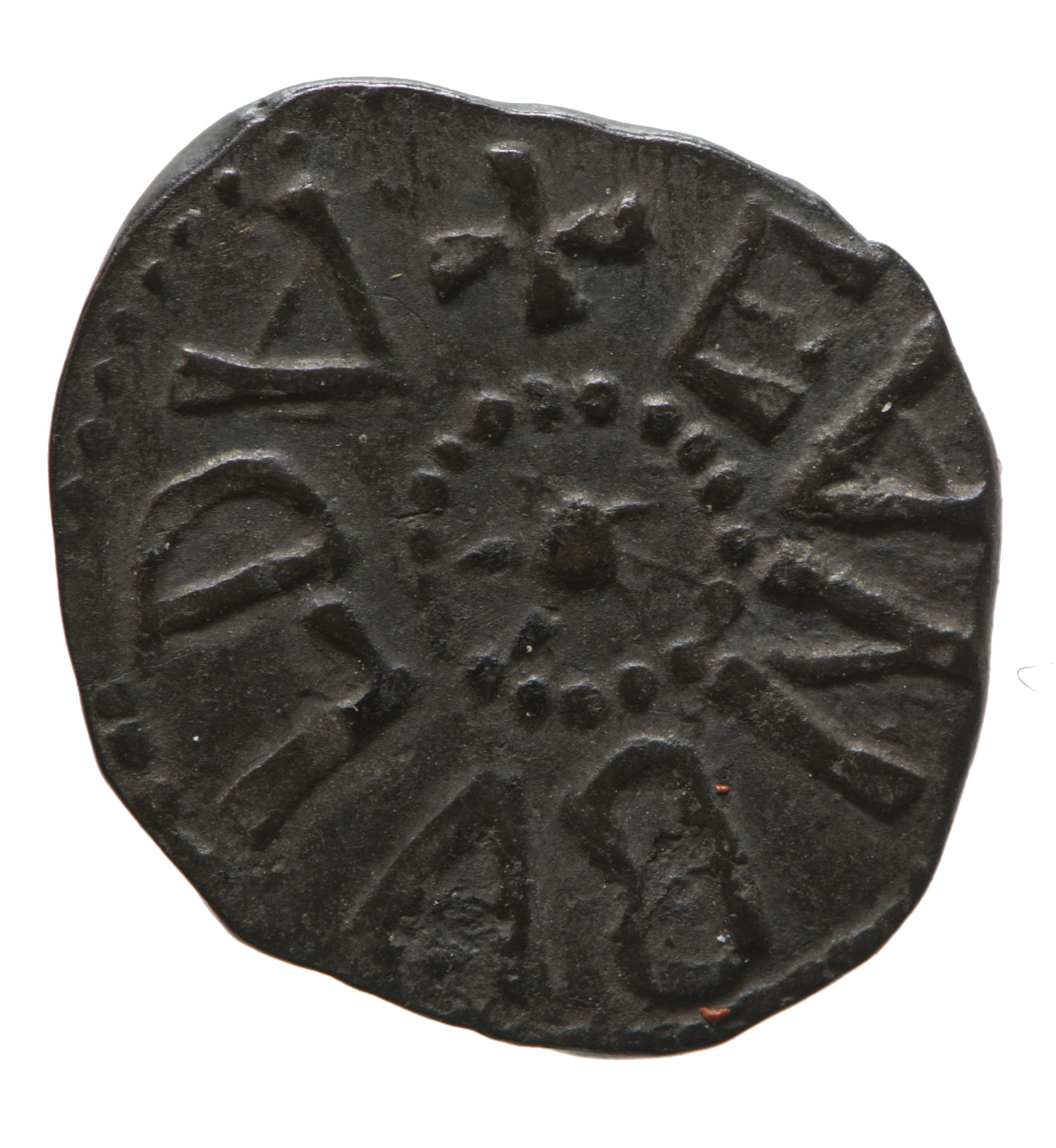
- Copper styca of Eanbald II
- Appointed: c. 796
- Term ended: c. 808
- Predecessor: Eanbald I
- Successor: Wulfsige

Orders
- Consecration: 14 August 796

Personal details
- Born: unknown
- Died: c. 808

Eanbald II (Note: Usually known as Eanbald II to distinguish him from an earlier archbishop also named Eanbald.) (died c. 808) was an eighth century Archbishop of York and correspondent of Alcuin.

== Life ==
Eanbald was taught by Alcuin when Alcuin was the teacher of the school of York, and was affectionately nicknamed "Simeon" by Alcuin.

Eanbald was consecrated the successor of his namesake to the archbishopric of York on 14 August 796.

Alcuin wrote frequently to Eanbald, laying down many rules for the direction of his province. He sent many gifts to York, including a shipload of metal (stagnum) for the roof of the bell tower at York Minster.

Eanbald assisted Æthelhard, Archbishop of Canterbury, in recovering the rights of the See of Canterbury which had been despoiled by Offa.

In 798 Eanbald assembled his clergy in synod at Finchale, near Durham. There, he enacted a number of regulations relating to the ecclesiastical courts and the observance of Easter. He may have been the first to introduce the Roman Ritual in the church of York.

Eanbald became estranged from Eardwulf, king of Northumbria after denouncing Eardwulf's adulteries as well as Eanbald's sheltering of Eardwulf's enemies in church sanctuary.

Eanbald died sometime about 808, perhaps as late as 830, if numismatic evidence is correct.

== Coinage ==
Eanbald, like later archbishops of York, produced coinage in his name.

== Citations ==
Christian titles
| Preceded by Eanbald I | Archbishop of York c. 796–c. 808 | Succeeded by Wulfsige |
