= Osberht of Northumbria =

Osberht
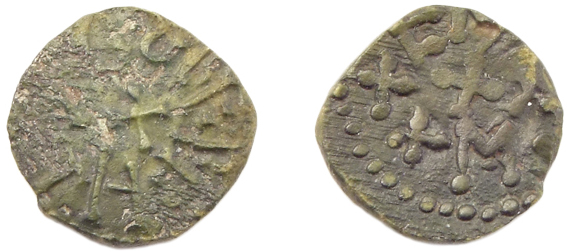
- A styca of Osberht

King of Northumbria
- Reign: c. 849 – c. 862 AD
- Predecessor: Æthelred II
- Successor: Ælla
- Died: 21 March 867
- House: Northumbria

Osberht (died 21 March 867) was king of Northumbria in the middle of the 9th century. Sources on Northumbrian history in this period are limited. Osberht's descent is not known and the dating of his reign is problematic.

== Chronicles ==
Osberht became king after Æthelred son of Eanred was murdered. The date of Æthelred's death is not certain, but is generally placed in 848. However, Symeon of Durham writes that "Ethelred the son of Eanred reigned nine years. When he was slain Osbryht held the kingdom for thirteen years" and states that 854 was "the fifth year of the rule of Osbert, the successor of Ethelred, who had been put to death".

Little is known of Osberht's reign. Symeon states that "Osbert had dared with sacrilegious hand to wrest from that church Wercewurde and Tillemuthe". The Historia de Sancto Cuthberto dates the seizure of these lands to the year before Osberht's death. Osberht was replaced as king by Ælla. While Ælla is described in most sources as a tyrant, and not a rightful king, one source states that he was Osberht's brother.

The Great Heathen Army marched on Northumbria in the late summer of 866, seizing York on 21 November 866. Symeon of Durham, the Anglo-Saxon Chronicle, Asser, and Æthelweard all recount substantially the same version of events in varying detail. Symeon's Historia Regum Anglorum gives this account of the battle on 21 March 867 where Osberht and Ælla met their deaths at the hands of the Vikings:

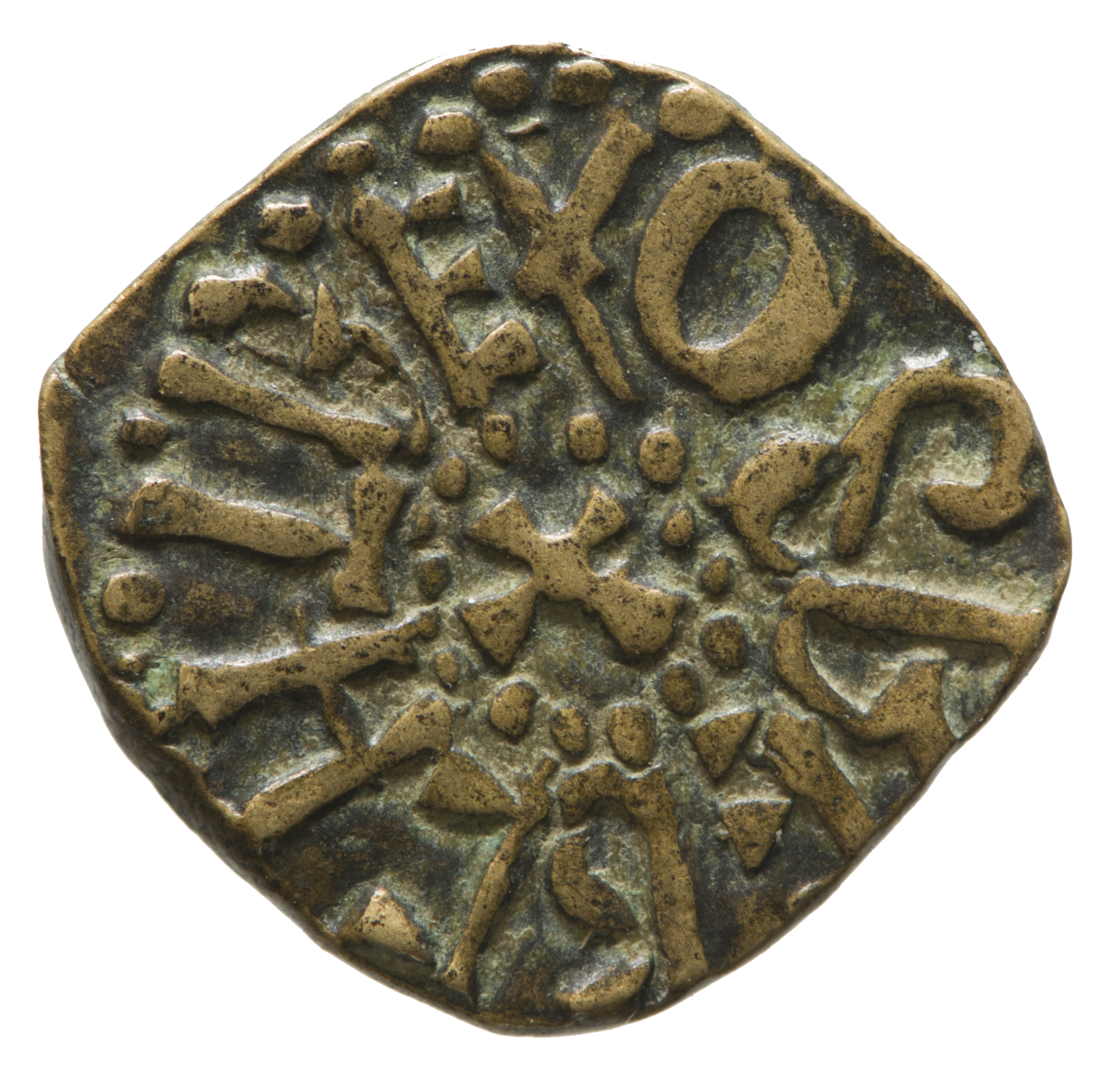
Copper alloy of styca of King Osberht

In those days, the nation of the Northumbrians had violently expelled from the kingdom the rightful king of their nation, Osbryht by name, and had placed at the head of the kingdom a certain tyrant, named Alla. When the pagans came upon the kingdom, the dissension was allayed by divine counsel and the aid of the nobles. King Osbryht and Alla, having united their forces and formed an army, came to the city of York; on their approach the multitude of the shipmen immediately took flight. The Christians, perceiving their flight and terror, found that they themselves were the stronger party. They fought upon each side with much ferocity, and both kings fell. The rest who escaped made peace with the Danes.

King Osberht may have been buried in Thornhill, Yorkshire. A rare cluster of high status Anglian gravestones from that era, one bearing his name, were discovered in Victorian times in the graveyard of the ancient church of St Michael and All Angels, where they are on public display.

After this, the Vikings appointed one Ecgberht to rule Northumbria.

== Sagas ==
Ragnarssona þáttr (The Tale of Ragnar's sons) adds a great deal of colour to accounts of the Viking conquest of York. This associates the semi-legendary king of Sweden Ragnar Lodbrok and his sons, Hvitserk, Björn Ironside, Sigurd Snake-in-the-Eye, Ivar the Boneless, and Ubbe. According to the stories, Ragnar was killed by Ælla, and the army which seized York in 866 was led by Ragnar's sons who avenged his death by subjecting Ælla to the blood eagle.

Earlier English sources record that Ælla and Osberht died in battle, the Anglo-Saxon Chronicle stating that "both the kings were slain on the spot". The main figure in the revenge tales is Ivar, who is sometimes associated with the Viking leader Ímar, brother of Amlaíb Conung, found in the Irish annals. Dorothy Whitelock notes that "it is by no means certain that he should be identified with the son of Ragnar, for the name is not uncommon". The Anglo-Saxon Chronicle does not name the leaders in Northumbria, but it does state that "Hingwar and Hubba" slew King Edmund of East Anglia (Saint Edmund) some years later. Hubba is named as a leader of the army in Northumbria by Abbo of Fleury, and by the Historia Historia de Sancto Cuthberto. Symeon of Durham lists the leaders of the Viking army as "Halfdene, Inguar, Hubba, Beicsecg, Guthrun, Oscytell, Amund, Sidroc and another duke of the same name, Osbern, Frana, and Harold."

Norman historian Geoffrey Gaimar and Geoffrey of Wells both associate an Englishman named "Bern" or "Buern" with bringing the Danes to England, in Gaimar's case to Northumbria, in Geoffrey of Wells' mid-twelfth-century hagiography of Saint Edmund, to East Anglia. Gaimar's account has "Buern" seeking revenge for Osberht's rape of his wife.

== Other ==
Hector Boece relates that two Northumbrian princes, Osbrecht and Ella, took the castle at Stirling.

== Notes ==
Regnal titles
Preceded by Æthelred or Rædwulf	King of Northumbria before 853–866	Succeeded by Ælla and Ecgberht
