= Coupland =

Coupland can refer to:

== Places ==
- Coupland, Cumbria, England. Traditionally located in Westmorland
- Coupland, Northumberland, England
  - Coupland Castle
- Coupland, Texas, United States

== Other uses ==
- Coupland (surname)
