= Timeline of Northumbria and Northumberland =

The following is a timeline of the history of Northumbria and Northumberland, England.

== Pre-2nd century ==
- 10,000 BC
  - First people arrived and lived in Northumbria
- 7,800BC
  - Mesolithic house on the coast at Howick excavated and dated to this time

== 1st century ==
- 79
  - Romans first arrived in Northumbria
  - Vindolanda Roman fort first built of timber
- 79-80
  - Romans occupied Northumberland with Corbridge as their main base and river crossing

== 2nd Century ==
- 105
  - Vindolanda was abandoned, but later rebuilt and enlarged
- 120-122
  - Pons Aelius small Roman fort and bridge was established in what is now Newcastle upon Tyne
- 122
  - July: Hadrian visited Northumbria and ordered the building of Hadrian's Wall
  - Construction of Hadrian's Wall began
- 126
  - Hadrian's Wall was completed
- 128
  - Hadrian's Wall was completed
- 132
  - Hadrian's Wall was completed
- 197
  - Two Roman forts in Redesdale were attacked and destroyed, but were later rebuilt

== 3rd century ==
- 297
  - Picts invaded Northumbria from the north and it took the Romans 9 years to regain control

== 4th century ==
- 311
  - Two Roman forts in Redesdale were again attacked and destroyed by the Picts and abandoned
- 342
  - Picts attacked Northumbria
- 367
  - Picts attacked again
- 382
  - Picts attacked again

== 5th century ==
- 407-410
  - Roman army withdrawn

== 6th century ==
=== 540s ===
- 547
  - Ida, the leader of the Anglian royal family of Bernicia, extended the boundaries of Bernicia northwards to include areas centred on Bamburgh
  - Dinguardi (Bamburgh) was captured and became the seat of Anglian power in the Kingdom of Bernicia

=== 550s ===
- 559
  - Ida of Bernicia is the first known King of Bernicia; he reigned from 547 to 559.

=== 590s ===
- 593
  - Æthelfrith became king of Bernicia, with its capital in Bamburgh

== 7th century ==
=== 600s ===
- 603
  - Æthelfrith, king of Bernicia defeated the Scots of Dalriada (Argyll) and Anglian colonisation was free to proceed
- 604
  - Æthelfrith, king of Bernicia, took control of the Anglo-Saxon kingdom of Deira to form Northumbria

=== 610s ===
- 613
  - Æthelfrith engaged in the Battle of Chester.
- 617
  - Eadwine became king of the united realms of Bernicia and Deira

=== 620s ===
- 625
  - Paulinus arrived in Northumbria from Canterbury
- 627
  - Paulinus, Roman missionary, preached and baptised in Northumbria
  - Edwin of Northumbria was baptised

=== 630s ===
- 633
  - King Edwin of Northumbria was killed at the Battle of Hatfield Chase, after which Cadwallon ap Cadfan, King of Gwynedd, took over the throne of Northumbria
  - In the Battle of Heavenfield, Oswald of Northumbria, leading a borrowed Scottish army, defeated Cadwallon ap Cadfan
  - Lindisfarne Priory founded by Irish monk Saint Aidan
- 634-642
  - Oswald of Northumbria "reunited the whole of Northumbria".
- 635
  - Saint Aidan went from Iona to Lindisfarne to build a monastery, given by Oswald of Northumbria
- 638
  - Gododdin hillfort at Edinburgh is captured by Oswald of Northumbria (see Northumbrian Edinburgh)

=== 650s ===
- 651
  - Saint Aidan died

=== 660s ===
- 660
  - St Ebba's Chapel was established at Ebb's Nook, Beadnell
- 664
  - The Synod of Whitby resulted in the Celtic church being driven out of Northumbria and replaced by the Roman Catholic church

=== 670s ===
- 671/672
  - Saint Wilfrid given the site for a church at Hexham by Northumbrian queen Æthelthryth
- 675-80
  - St Wilfrid's Church built at Hexham

=== 680s ===
- 685
  - Loss to Picts at Battle of Dun Nechtain (Nechtansmere) limits northern expansion.
- 687
  - Cuthbert, patron saint of Northumbria, died at his Inner Farne Island hermitage
- 698-721
  - Bishop Eadfrith led the community of Lindisfarne

== 8th century ==
=== 700s ===
- 709
  - Acca is appointed as Bishop of Hexham

=== 710s ===
- 715
  - Eadfrith creates the Lindisfarne Gospels

=== 720s ===
- 721
  - Bishop Eadfrith died

=== 730s ===
- 735
  - Alcuin of York is born, later a major figure in the Carolingian Renaissance under Charlemagne.

=== 790s ===
- 793
  - 8 June: Vikings raid Lindisfarne

== 9th century ==
=== 800s ===
- 802
  - 11 June: Egbert of Lindisfarne was consecrated Bishop of Lindisfarne at St Peter's Church, Bywell

=== 820s ===
- 827
  - Northumbria accepts Egbert of Wessex as overlord.

=== 860s ===
- 865
  - Northumbrians led by Aelle II defeat Ragnar Lodbrok's raiding Vikings.
- 866
  - York and southern Northumbria are conquered and settled by the "Great Heathen Army."
- 867
  - Aelle II and Osberht join forces only to be defeated at the Battle of York

=== 870s ===
- 875
  - The Lindisfarne Gospels were moved from Lindisfarne to escape the Viking threat
  - Vikings under Halfdan Ragnarsson sailed into the River Tyne and sacked monasteries at Tynemouth and Jarrow, before setting up camp at Gateshead
- 876
  - Halfdan Ragnarsson and his Danes laid the country waste, sacking Hexham and destroying St Wilfrid's Church

== 10th century ==
=== 910s ===
- 915
  - Ealdred I of Bernicia and Constantine II of Scotland are defeated by Vikings in the first Battle of Corbridge

=== 920s ===
- 927
  - Earldom of Northumbria created by Athelstan

=== 930s ===
- 937
  - Athelstan defeats Norse-Celtic force in the battle of Brunanburh

=== 940s ===
- 947/48
  - Eric Bloodaxe King of Northumbria.

=== 950s ===
- 952/54
  - Eric Bloodaxe King of Northumbria again.
- 954
  - Eadred of Wessex permanently "absorbed Northumbria into the English Kingdom."

=== 990s ===
- 993
  - Bamburgh Castle destroyed by the Vikings.
- 995
  - Monks from Lindisfarne establish Durham

== 11th century ==
=== 1010s ===
- 1013
  - Uhtred the Bold, ealdorman of all Northumbria submitted to Sweyn Forkbeard as did all of the Danes in the north.
- 1018
  - Lothian is lost to the King of Scots Malcolm II.

=== 1040s ===
- 1041
  - Eadwulf, earl of Bamburgh was "betrayed" by king Harthacnut and killed by Siward

=== 1060s ===
- 1065
  - The term Northumberland is first recorded in the Anglo-Saxon Chronicle
- 1069
  - William I ruthlessly suppressed opposition in the Harrying of the North in Northumbria and Durham
  - Bedlington was one of the places where Saint Cuthbert's coffin rested as the monks sought to return it to Lindisfarne

=== 1070s ===
- 1072
  - William I crosses Northumbria into Scotland, supported by a large fleet, to challenge King Malcolm III of Scotland
  - According to the Chronicles of the Monk of Tynemouth, King William, returning from Scotland, encamped a large army on the River Tyne near Newcastle, which had formerly been known as Monkchester
- 1073
  - Aldwin, Prior of Winchcombe, along with two monks from Evesham, visited Monkchester
- 1079
  - King Malcolm III led the Scots in another attack on Northumbria

=== 1080s ===
- 1080
  - Robert Curthose, on return from an expedition in Scotland, laid the foundation of a wooden 'new castle' to defend the Tyne crossing at Newcastle, from which the town took its name
- 1086
  - Robert de Mowbray became Earl of Northumbria
- 1088
  - Robert de Mowbray rebelled against William II of England in the Rebellion of 1088
- 1089
  - Northumberland county is created

=== 1090s ===
- 1091
  - St Nicholas' Church in Newcastle upon Tyne was founded by Osmund, Bishop of Salisbury
- 1092
  - William Rufus had the castle at Newcastle rebuilt in stone
- 1093
  - Malcolm III of Scotland again invaded Northumbria and reached Alnwick. In the Battle of Alnwick Malcolm was killed
- 1095
  - Robert de Mowbray again rebelled against William II of England
  - Bamburgh Castle, the seat of Robert de Mowbray, was besieged by William II. de Mowbray escaped but was captured at Tynemouth and Bamburgh Castle fell. He was subsequently imprisoned for life.
  - Castle at Newcastle was captured during a revolt by Norman barons, but later retaken by William Rufus
  - Prudhoe Castle built (approx date).
- 1096
  - Alnwick Castle construction begins.

== 12th century ==
=== 1100s ===
- 1105
  - Holy Trinity church in Old Bewick given by Queen Matilda to Tynemouth Priory

=== 1110s ===
- 1113
  - Hexham Abbey was refounded

=== 1120s ===
- 1121
  - Norham Castle construction begins.

=== 1130s ===
- 1135
  - Construction started of Brinkburn Priory
- 1136
  - King David I of Scotland invaded Northumbria, capturing Wark, Norham, Alnwick and Newcastle, all of which he later gave up
- 1138
  - King David I of Scotland again invaded, capturing the same places as taken in earlier campaigns
  - Construction of Newminster Abbey was begun, near Morpeth
- 1139
  - Under the terms of the Treaty of Durham, Northumberland, with the exception of Newcastle and Bamburgh, was ceded to Scottish rule

=== 1140s ===
- 1147
  - Alnwick Abbey is founded
- 1149
  - Newcastle was conceded to the Scots by Henry of Anjou, in return for Scottish support

=== 1150s ===
- 1150
  - Warkworth Castle built (approx date).
- 1157
  - Henry II reclaims Northumberland from Scotland
  - Alnwick Castle rebuilt in stone

=== 1160s ===
- 1160
  - Castle is built at Norham
- 1165
  - Blanchland Abbey is founded

=== 1170s ===
- 1172
  - Construction of The Castle, Newcastle, a stone castle with rectangular keep was begun,
- 1173
  - William the Lion of Scotland invaded Northumbria in an unsuccessful campaign
- 1174
  - William the Lion of Scotland again invaded Northumbria and laid siege to Newcastle, but was unable to take it
  - While besieging Alnwick, William I of Scotland is captured and imprisoned in Newcastle.

=== 1180s ===
- 1181-1536
  - The monks of Newminster Abbey held the lordship of Kidland with a right of way from Newminster

== 13th century ==
=== 1210s ===
- 1213
  - King John granted a charter under which the burgesses of Newcastle would be confirmed in perpetuity at an advanced annual rent of £100 to be paid direct to the Crown, not to the Sheriff of Northumberland as before
- 1215
  - King John devastated much of the border area in retaliation for Alexander II of Scotland's support of English barons and Berwick-upon-Tweed, Alnwick and Morpeth were burned
- 1216
  - 28 January: A charter granted by King John to Newcastle burgesses confirmed the liberties and free customs they had enjoyed in the time of his ancestors
  - The first use of the title Mayor of Newcastle was recorded when Daniel, son of Nicholas, was called mayor
  - King John orders destruction of Berwick-upon-Tweed

=== 1230s ===
- 1235
  - King Henry III granted to the burgesses of Newcastle the right to exclude Jews
- 1237
  - Alexander II of Scotland finally renounced any claim to Northumbria and the Treaty of York legally defined the northern border of England and Scotland
- 1239
  - A drought of three months in Newcastle was followed by three months of rain leading to many deaths

=== 1240s ===
- 1240
  - Hulne Priory founded.
- 1242
  - Fire destroyed the wooden bridge over the River Tyne
- 1244
  - King Henry III came to Newcastle with a large army on his way to attack Alexander II of Scotland
- 1247
  - Construction of the Black Gate at The Castle, Newcastle began
- 1247-1257
  - William Heron of Ford was Sheriff of Northumberland and governor of the Castle at Newcastle
- 1248
  - After fire destroyed the wooden bridge over the River Tyne, and much of the borough, a new stone bridge was eventually constructed

=== 1250s ===
- 1250
  - Construction of the Black Gate at The Castle, Newcastle was completed
  - Haughton Castle built. (approx date).

=== 1260s ===
- 1265
  - Work started on the building of a town wall for Newcastle
  - King Henry III licensed the collection of a toll by the burgesses of Newcastle towards the cost of building the town wall
- 1267
  - In a dispute over coal rights, Mayor Richardson of Newcastle and the rest of the corporation sailed down the Tyne to North Shields and burnt it down

=== 1290s ===
- 1292
  - John Balliol, King of Scotland, did homage for his crown to King Edward I in the castle at Newcastle
- 1296
  - King Edward I passed through Newcastle with an army of some 34,000 against revolt of John Balliol
  - 29 March: King Edward I forces arrived at Norham
  - 30 March: English force sacked Berwick-upon-Tweed prior to defeating Scots in the Battle of Dunbar
  - A series of sporadic but savage retaliatory Scottish attacks continued into Northumberland
  - A Lay Subsidy Roll recorded the taxable population of those wards in Northumberland under the direct control of the King's Sheriff
- 1297
  - Scots led by William Wallace laid waste to Northumberland from Hexham up to the walls of Newcastle, burning Hexham, Corbridge, Ryton, Wylam and Prudhoe

== 14th century ==
=== 1300s ===
- 1305
  - The right hand quarter of the executed William Wallace was exhibited at the gateway on the Newcastle side of the bridge over the Tyne
  - Aydon Hall was given permission to be turned into a castle (Licence to crenellate)
  - Bolam had a market, a fair, a castle and about 200 houses around a village green
- 1307
  - Percy family acquired Alnwick Castle

=== 1310s ===
- 1311
  - August: Robert the Bruce invaded Northumberland and savaged most of the county
  - September: The Scots invaded with an even larger army, but Robert the Bruce was paid off with a £2000 ransom
  - Robert the Bruce reappeared with a demand for a further £2000 ransom
  - King Edward II took refuge in Newcastle Castle from the Duke of Lancaster
- 1314
  - The county was ravaged by Robert the Bruce.
- 1315
  - An army of King Edward II invaded Northumberland
- 1317
  - Grevious famine and mortality in Newcastle
- 1318
  - Berwick-on-Tweed was besieged by the Scots and fell after a few months
  - Norham Castle was besieged for a year by the Scots but did not fall

=== 1320s ===
- 1322
  - Dunstanburgh Castle built.
  - A quarter of the body of the executed Andrew Harclay, 1st Earl of Carlisle was exhibited in Newcastle

=== 1330s ===
- 1330
  - Peel tower added to Featherstone Castle.
- 1332
  - King Edward III laid siege to Berwick-upon-Tweed
  - Percy family acquired Warkworth Castle
- 1333
  - July: King Edward III defeated the Scots in the Battle of Halidon Hill
- 1334
  - King Edward III received the homage of Edward Balliol at the Blackfriars, the Dominican Friary in Newcastle
  - Roger Mauduyt was Sheriff of Northumberland and reported that the Castle in Newcastle was 'decayed and left to neglect'
- 1339
  - A flood swept away the greater part of the stone bridge at Newcastle

=== 1340s ===
- 1341
  - Troops of John de Warenne, 7th Earl of Surrey damaged Blackfriars priory and caused further damage more widely in the town
- 1342
  - King David II of Scotland laid siege to Newcastle, but the town was successfully defended by Lord John Neville of Hornby
- 1345
  - Newcastle was visited by a pestilence which lasted two years
- 1346
  - Scottish force sacked Hexham prior to defeat at the Battle of Neville's Cross
- 1349
  - Successive outbreaks of plague led to the halving of the population of Northumberland
  - Fire nearly destroyed the whole of Newcastle

=== 1350s ===
- 1353
  - Newcastle became one of ten Staple towns, an Act of Parliament decreeing that 'no wools of growth in Northumberland, Cumberland, Westmorland, Durham, Richmond and Allerton, should be shipped anywhere but Newcastle'
- 1355
  - Scots victory at Battle of Nesbit Moor

=== 1370s ===
- 1370
  - Belsay Castle built. (approx date).
- 1377
  - Henry Percy became first Earl of Northumberland
  - Henry Percy, 1st Earl of Northumberland led an army of 10,000 men into Scotland
- 1378
  - 1st Earl of Northumberland besieged and took Berwick-on-Tweed

=== 1380s ===
- 1380
  - Northumberland invaded by Scots
  - Newcastle town petitioned the Crown for financial relief as so much of the population had been lost to plague outbreaks
- 1383
  - King Richard II visited Newcastle
  - John Neville of Raby was appointed by the King to inspect the condition of Newcastle in terms of both men and fortifications
- 1385
  - Northumberland again invaded by the Scots
- 1388
  - Northumberland again invaded by the Scots
  - The Bishop of Durham camped at Elsdon on his way to Otterburn
  - 19 August: In the Battle of Otterburn Scots forces of James, Earl Douglas, which had invaded Northumbria, met with, and defeated the forces of Henry Percy (Hotspur). Earl Douglas was killed in the battle and Hotspur and his brother, Ralph, were captured and ransomed
- 1389
  - Northumberland again invaded by the Scots

== 15th century ==
=== 1400s ===
- 1400
  - King Henry IV visited Newcastle and granted county status to the town, separating the town, but not the Castle and its precincts, from the county of Northumberland, with the right to appoint its own sheriff. Newcastle was the fourth town in England to receive this mark of favour after London, Bristol and York
- 1402
  - Scots defeated at the Battle of Humbleton Hill
- 1403
  - Henry "Hotspur" Percy is killed at Shrewsbury in battle against Henry IV
- 1408
  - A quarter of the body of the executed Earl of Northumberland was put on display in Newcastle

=== 1410s ===
- 1415
  - Scots marauders defeated at the Battle of Yeavering by Sir Robert de Umfraville
  - King Henry V ordered a survey of fortifications in Northumberland and 78 towers were listed

=== 1430s ===
- 1435
  - Aeneas Silvius (later Pope Pius II), travelled from Edinburgh through Northumbria, describing it as "uninhabitable, uncultivated and horrible"

=== 1450s ===
- 1450
  - Dilston Castle built. (approx date)

=== 1460s ===
- 1461
  - King Edward IV visited Newcastle
- 1462-1463
  - John de Mowbray, 4th Duke of Norfolk overwintered in Newcastle supplying the armies of Richard Neville, 16th Earl of Warwick
- 1464
  - Battle of Hexham
  - In the Battle of Hedgeley Moor the Lancastrians were defeated
  - Bamburgh Castle attacked by forces of King Henry VI and became the first British castle to be defeated by gunfire
- 1465
  - Richard Neville, 16th Earl of Warwick came to Newcastle for negotiations with a Scottish delegation

=== 1480s ===
- 1482
  - Berwick-upon-Tweed last re-captured by England
- 1483
  - Sir Richard Loraine was killed by Scots when returning from prayer at Kirkharle church
- 1487
  - King Henry VII resided for several weeks in Newcastle

=== 1490s ===
- 1490
  - The vaulted chancel of St Gregory's Church in Kirknewton was rebuilt

== 16th century ==
=== 1500s ===
- 1500
  - Birth of Bishop Ridley who was martyred in 1555.

=== 1510s ===
- 1513
  - February: English defeat invading Scots at Battle of Flodden Field

=== 1530s ===
- 1532
  - Thirty Armstrong Reivers were hanged at the Westgate gallows in Newcastle and their severed heads displayed on the castle walls
- 1539
  - January: The five friaries in Newcastle were dissolved and taken over by the Crown
  - Gilbert Collingwood was Bailiff of Bewick Tower in Old Bewick

=== 1540s ===
- 1541
  - Castle at Alnham was destroyed by the Scots
- 1542
  - A survey of border castles and towers was ordered by King Henry VIII
  - Blenkinsopp Castle was described as ruinous, although it was restored much later
- 1547
  - Edward Seymour, 1st Duke of Somerset made Newcastle his base during his campaign against the Scots
- 1549
  - John Knox appointed parish minister in Berwick-upon-Tweed

=== 1550s ===
- 1550
  - John Knox moved from Berwick-upon-Tweed to Newcastle where he remained for about two years
- 1551
  - John Dudley becomes first Duke of Northumberland.

=== 1560s ===
- 1564
  - The Company of Merchant Adventurers of Newcastle made it an offence for any of its members to employ as apprentices anyone from the reivers strongholds of Tynedale or Redesdale
- 1569
  - Thomas Percy, 7th Earl of Northumberland rebelled against Elizabeth I in the failed Rising of the North

=== 1570s ===
- 1572
  - The liberty of Hexham was annexed to Northumberland.
- 1579
  - Over 2,000 people died of pestilence in Newcastle

=== 1580s ===
- 1581
  - A statutory commission inquired what tenancies and houses had been ruined or decayed since 1535 and identified 2,000 homes in the Border Counties, mostly in Northumberland
- 1583
  - Kinmont Willie Armstrong led 300 reivers into North Tynedale where they stole cattle, horses and sheep, burnt 60 houses and killed 10 men
- 1587
  - October: A raid into Tynedale by 400 Scottish attackers led by Kinmont Willie Armstrong led to the partial destruction of Haydon Bridge
- 1588
  - Plague in the northern counties
- 1589
  - Over 1,800 people died of pestilence in Newcastle

=== 1590s ===
- 1597
  - Plague kills 340 in Newcastle
- 1598
  - Plague in the northern counties

== 17th century ==
=== 1600s ===
- 1603
  - Union of crowns under James I
  - King James I passed through Newcastle on his journey south
- 1606
  - James I transports Border Reivers to Ireland in the Plantation of Ulster

=== 1610s ===
- 1611
  - Scottish Elliots and Armstrongs raided into Tynedale
- 1614
  - July: A Commission for 'conservancy of the river' (Tyne) was established by Order in Council made up of the Corporation of Newcastle, the Bishop of Durham and justices of the peace for the two counties (Durham & Northumberland)
- 1617
  - King James I was in Newcastle
  - Newcastle secured the whole authority for conservancy of the Tyne, vested in the Mayor, six aldermen and certain members of the Merchant Company and Trinity House
- 1619
  - Callaly Castle, which had begun as a pele tower, was remodelled

=== 1630s ===
- 1633
  - King Charles I was in Newcastle
- 1636
  - Death toll in Newcastle from the plague was 5037, an estimated 47% of the population
- 1639
  - King Charles I was in Newcastle leading an army to destroy Scottish Covenanters

=== 1640s ===
- 1640
  - 28 August: At the Battle of Newburn the Scots army under Colonel Leslie defeated the King's forces and thereafter occupied Newcastle
- 1641
  - August: Scots army left Newcastle after which the Government indemnified the town for its losses with a grant of £60,000
  - King Charles I passed through Northumberland
- 1644
  - January: Scots army crossed into Northumberland
  - February: General Leslie (now Earl of Leven), laid siege to Newcastle, only to withdraw the bulk of his army after three weeks
  - July: General Leslie again besieged Newcastle, which held out for three months under the leadership of Mayor Sir John Marley
  - October: Siege ended when Newcastle fell to the Scots assault
  - Morpeth Castle was besieged and severely damaged
- 1646
  - 13 May: King Charles I threw himself on the protection of the Scottish army which brought him to Newcastle where he was held for nine months
- 1647
  - 3 November: King Charles was given up by his captors in Newcastle to the Commissioners of the English Parliament
- 1649
  - 14 women are convicted and executed in Newcastle witch trials.

=== 1650s ===
- 1650
  - 15 July: Oliver Cromwell and his army arrived in Newcastle before marching on to Scotland
- 1654
  - Wenceslaus Hollar's map of the River Tyne was published
- 1655
  - Ralph Gardiner of Chirton, Northumberland, published a pamphlet "England's grievance discovered in relation to the coal trade, the tyrannical oppression of the magistrates of Newcastle, their charters and grants, the several traits, depositions and judgements obtained against them"
- 1657
  - Robert Trollope was awarded the freedom of the corporation of Newcastle upon Tyne

=== 1660s ===
- 1668
  - Capheaton Hall was built, designed by Robert Trollope

=== 1670s ===
- 1672
  - A coal beacon was established on the Farne Islands
  - Clifford's Fort was built to protect the quay at North Shields
- 1674
  - Corbridge Bridge was constructed
- 1676
  - Callaly Castle was again remodelled, to designs by Robert Trollope

=== 1680s ===
- 1689
  - Many of the older buildings of Morpeth were destroyed by fire

=== 1690s ===
- 1695
  - Holy Trinity Church, Old Bewick was restored

== 18th century ==
=== 1700s ===
- 1707
  - Act of Union joins the Scottish government with that of England and Wales
- 1709
  - Construction of a wagonway from the pits at Plessey to Blyth revived the manufacture of salt and the coal trade

=== 1710s ===
- 1714
  - October: Northumberland rebels against King George I for the Pretender mustered at Morpeth under General Thomas Forster, to be joined by the Earl of Derwentwater
  - John Wallis (antiquary) was born in Kirkhaugh
  - Morpeth Town Hall was rebuilt, designed by John Vanbrugh
- 1715
  - Capability Brown was born in Kirkharle
- 1717-21
  - Berwick Barracks constructed
- 1718-1729
  - Seaton Delaval Hall constructed for George Delaval, designed by Sir John Vanbrugh

=== 1730s ===
- 1735
  - February: Corbridge Lanx (Roman silver dish) found on the banks of the Tyne near Corbridge
- 1736
  - Alnwick Town Hall was built
- 1737
  - The Commissioners of Greenwich Hospital were granted the estates of the Earl of Derwentwater which had been confiscated by the Crown following the Jacobite rising of 1715

=== 1740s ===
- 1745
  - Scant Northumberland support for Bonnie Prince Charlie in the second Jacobite rising
- 1746
  - Prince William, Duke of Cumberland passed through Newcastle on his way north to Scotland

=== 1750s ===
- 1750
  - Callaly Castle was extended
- 1751
  - An Act of Parliament was obtained for the construction of a new road, known as the Military Road, between Carlisle and Newcastle and construction was begun
- 1752
  - Fire at Seaton Delaval Hall
- 1754-61
  - Berwick Town Hall constructed
- 1755
  - Ralph Carr founded the first bank in Newcastle, the oldest provincial bank in England except for Nottingham
- 1757
  - Construction of the Military Road between Carlisle and Newcastle was completed

=== 1760s ===
- 1761
  - Troops in Hexham shot 40 miners protesting against conscription
- 1763-66
  - Coldstream Bridge built over the River Tweed at Cornhill-on-Tweed, designed by John Smeaton
- 1765
  - The Shambles in Alnwick was replaced with the building of Assembly Rooms (Northumberland Hall)
- 1766
  - The Shambles (market) in Hexham erected by Sir Walter Blackett
- 1767
  - First local public asylum for the pauper lunatics of Northumberland, Durham and Newcastle upon Tyne was erected by public subscription in Warden's Close, Newcastle
- 1768
  - The Commissioners of Greenwich Hospital established a lead smelting works at Langley to smelt their ore from Alston Moor

=== 1770s ===
- 1770
  - Arthur Young described the turnpike road between Carlisle and Newcastle as 'a more dreadful road cannot be imagined'
- 1771
  - 17 November: The Great Flood of 1771 saw the collapse of part of the then Tyne Bridge and its eventual demolition, as well as the destruction of all bridges on the Tyne except Corbridge
- 1773-81
  - A new bridge over the River Tyne was built, a low stone bridge of nine arches

=== 1780s ===
- 1781
  - Birth of George Stephenson in Wylam
  - New stone bridge over the River Tyne was completed
- 1782
  - 5th Regiment of Foot named the 5th (The Northumberland) Regiment of Foot
  - Floods swept away many bridges in Northumberland
- 1785-88
  - A stone bridge of nine arches was built at Hexham designed by Robert Mylne
- 1787
  - Over 7,000 miners worked in and around Newcastle
  - Birth of John Dobson in North Shields

=== 1790s ===
- 1792
  - William Winter was hanged at Elsdon as 'a warning to malefactors'
  - An Act of Parliament was passed for the division of common land in Hexhamshire and Allendale Common
- 1793
  - Construction of the present Hexham Bridge was completed

== 19th century ==
=== 1800s ===
- 1800
  - Bewick publishes British Birds
- 1809
  - The first round tower lighthouse was built on the Farne Islands

=== 1810s ===
- 1810
  - Belsay Hall construction began, designed by John Dobson for Sir Charles Monck
- 1812-15
  - Cresswell Hall built in Cresswell, Northumberland
- 1814
  - A market cross was erected in Corbridge
- 1815
  - Grace Darling born in Bamburgh
- 1816
  - Tenantry Column was erected in Alnwick, designed by David Stephenson
- 1818
  - 13 January: The first gas lamps were lit in Mosley Street, Newcastle, watched by a large crowd
- 1819
  - Newcastle Regiment of Yeomanry Cavalry raised
  - 11 October: Protest meeting against the Peterloo Massacre took place on the Town Moor, Newcastle upon Tyne with 75-100,000 in attendance

=== 1820s ===
- 1820
  - Union Chain Bridge built over the River Tweed at Loan End, designed by Samuel Brown
- 1821
  - A gas explosion at Wallsend Colliery resulted in 52 deaths.
- 1822
  - Fire at Seaton Delaval Hall
- 1824
  - Newcastle Corporation took possession of the asylum for pauper lunatics of Northumberland, Durham and Newcastle upon Tyne and leased it to Dr Noel Smith
- 1829
  - Stephenson's Rocket wins the Rainhill Trials.
  - Natural History Society of Northumbria founded.

=== 1830s ===
- 1831
  - 17 October: A crowd of 50,000 at Cow Hill, Newcastle, protested about the Reform Act
  - The old medieval bridge at Morpeth was replaced by a three span stone bridge designed by Thomas Telford
- 1831-1832
  - An outbreak of Cholera in Newcastle killed 306 people
- 1835
  - 18 June: A gas explosion at Wallsend Colliery killed 102 miners,the youngest of whom was aged eight and the oldest 75.
- 1838
  - 18 June: A through railway line from Redheugh to Carlisle was opened
  - 25 June: Northumberland Plate horse race took place for the first time on the Town Moor, Newcastle upon Tyne
  - 7 September: Grace Darling rescued survivors from the shipwrecked Forfarshire off the Farne Islands
  - Railways reach Newcastle with the opening of the Newcastle and Carlisle Railway
- 1839
  - 20 May: A large Chartist demonstration was held on the Town Moor, Newcastle upon Tyne, presided over by Thomas Hepburn, with an estimated 70-100,000 in attendance
  - Newcastle and North Shields Railway was completed

=== 1840s ===
- 1840
  - The Inclosure Act of 1840 specified the 'inground and outground' fields of Gunnerton in North Tyneside
- 1842
  - 20 October: Grace Darling died of consumption and was buried in Bamburgh
- 1844
  - Norham became part of the county of Northumberland
  - North British Railway operated from 1844 to 1922.
  - Wesleyan chapel built at Newbiggin-by-the-Sea
  - Bedlington ceased to be a detached area of the Bishopric of Durham and became part of Northumberland
- 1847
  - 5 July: The last mail coach ran from Newcastle to Edinburgh, due to the opening of railway between Newcastle and Berwick-upon-Tweed
  - Hoard (including swords and spears) found at Thurnton Farm near Whittingham
  - WG Armstong & Co founded at Elswick, Newcastle upon Tyne, on a 5.5 acre site, to build the hydraulic machinery Armstrong had invented
  - Stocks used for the last time at Scotsgate, Berwick-upon-Tweed
- 1847-50
  - Royal Border Bridge constructed, designed by Robert Stephenson

=== 1850s ===
- 1850
  - The River Tyne Improvement Act established a Conservancy Commission to replace the traditional control by Newcastle Council
  - Queen Victoria formally opened the High Level Bridge and Newcastle railway station
- 1853
  - An outbreak of cholera in Newcastle killed 1,527 people
  - Robert Rawlinson's public health report on Hexham condemned conditions there, particularly the water supply and sanitation
- 1854
  - Several railway companies serving Newcastle were merged to form the North Eastern Railway, including the Newcastle and Berwick Railway
  - The Great fire of Newcastle and Gateshead followed an explosion and fire at Gateshead, which spread to the Quayside, and killed 53 people, destroyed the homes of 800 families and damaged many properties
- 1854
  - The remodelling of the interior of Alnwick Castle began, to designs by Anthony Salvin
- 1858
  - The east end of Hexham Abbey was restored to designs by John Dobson
  - The church at Brinkburn Priory was restored

=== 1860s ===
- 1860
  - 2 March: 76 miners were killed in a gas explosion at the colliery in Burradon.
- 1861-65
  - Ford Castle was restored and made 'more baronial' by Louisa, Marquess of Waterford
- 1862
  - January: Hartley Colliery disaster in which 204 men and boys were killed, in Hartley
  - The Swing Bridge, River Tyne was constructed by WG Armstrong & Co
- 1862-63
  - William Armstrong had his house built at Cragside
- 1866
  - William Armstrong formed Tumbleton Lake on Debdon Burn to power a hydroelectric ram at Cragside
- 1866-67
  - Holy Trinity Church, Old Bewick was restored

=== 1870s ===
- 1870
  - William Armstrong formed Debdon Lake on Debdon Burn to provide hydroelectric power at Cragside
  - Railway to Rothbury was opened
- 1873
  - August: First Home Rule Conference was held in Newcastle, hosted by Isaac Butt and attended by Charles Stewart Parnell
  - Landed estates occupied about half of Northumberland
- 1876
  - The Swing Bridge, River Tyne was opened
  - A west wing was added to Haughton Castle designed by Anthony Salvin
- 1877
  - Rutherford College of Technology founded
- 1878
  - Work began on the building of a horse tram network in Newcastle by the Newcastle and Gateshead Tramways & Carriage Co Ltd
- 1879
  - Coventina's well, just outside Carrawburgh Roman fort, was explored yielding 13,487 coins and many other objects

=== 1880s ===
- 1880
  - Electric lighting was installed for William Armstrong at Cragside by Joseph Swan
- 1882
  - Newcastle was granted city status
- 1884
  - Prince of Wales (later Edward VII) and Princess Alexandra visited Cragside
  - St George's Church, Cullercoats was built to designs by John Loughborough Pearson
- 1887
  - William Armstrong was created 1st Baron of Cragside
  - Corbridge Town Hall was built
- 1889
  - The King of Siam and the Shah of Persia visited William Armstrong at Cragside

=== 1890s ===
- 1891
  - Population: 506,442.
- 1894
  - Bamburgh Castle was purchased by William Armstrong, undergoing restoration until 1905
- 1895
  - The Crown Prince of Afghanistan visited William Armstrong at Cragside
- 1898
  - Northumberland Golf Club was founded with a new course laid out around the Gosforth Park race course

== 20th century ==
=== 1900s ===
- 1900
  - WG Armstrong died, at which point his engineering works stretched over 230 acres and employed 25,000 men
- 1901
  - Population: 603,498.
- 1902
  - Morpeth To Newcastle Road Race was officially started
  - The ruins of Lindisfarne Castle were converted and restored by Sir Edwin Lutyens
  - A cross was erected in the centre of Rothbury, on the site of the old market cross, in honour of Lord Armstrong
- 1903
  - Smallpox epidemic hits Newcastle
- 1904
  - Suburban train lines to the coast from Newcastle were electrified
- 1907
  - The nave of Hexham Abbey was redesigned by Temple Moore
- 1908
  - Frank Melville of Elswick Harriers won the Morpeth To Newcastle Road Race

=== 1910s ===
- 1915-1916
  - Newcastle and Tyneside suffered a series of attacks by German Zeppelins

=== 1920s ===
- 1923
  - London and North Eastern Railway (LNER) created, merging several railway companies, including the North Eastern Railway
  - A meeting of Natural History Society of Northumberland, Durham and Newcastle upon Tyne made a public appeal for funds to enable the purchase of the Farne Islands and then to hand it over to the National Trust
- 1924
  - 7 August: Newcastle upon Tyne and Gateshead Corporations (Bridge) Act received Royal assent approving construction of the Tyne Bridge
- 1925
  - August: Work started on construction of the Tyne Bridge.Jacobean houses on Quayside, Newcastle, were demolished to make way way for the approaches to the bridge.
- 1928
  - 25 February: Upper ends of the arch of the Tyne Bridge closed amid celebrations
  - 10 October: Tyne Bridge officially opened by King George V
- 1929
  - North East Coast Exhibition took place in Newcastle, with nearly 4.5 million attendees

=== 1930s ===
- 1933
  - British Union of Fascists opened two clubs in Newcastle, one with the stated objective of 'the promotion of fascism in Benwell'. Both clubs closed after two years
- 1937
  - Bert Helmsley won the Morpeth To Newcastle Road Race
- 1939
  - The Chillingham Wild Cattle Association was founded to protect and maintain Chillingham cattle

=== 1940s ===
- 1940
  - Spitfires from RAF Acklington intercept Luftwaffe bombers off the Farne Islands
- 1941
  - 25 April: German bombing raid resulted in heavy casualties and damage in Heaton, Newcastle upon Tyne
- 1946-47
  - The surviving Chillingham cattle at Chillingham Park near Wooler were almost exterminated in the severe winter
- 1948
  - Bert Helmsley won the Morpeth To Newcastle Road Race for the second time

=== 1950s ===
- 1951
  - Bert Helmsley won the Morpeth To Newcastle Road Race for the third time, aged 42
- 1953
  - Jim Peters won the Morpeth To Newcastle Road Race, beating the record time by four minutes
- 1956
  - Montagu pit, the only operative pit in Newcastle, was closed, ending 209 years of mining
  - The first edition of Nikolaus Pevsner's Northumberland volume, in the Buildings of England series, was published

=== 1960s ===
- 1963
  - Newcastle University became independent of Durham University
  - Railway to Rothbury was closed
- 1965
  - Newcastle Stock Exchange was amalgamated with other exchanges in the north of England to form the Northern Stock Exchange
- 1966
  - Epidemic of foot-and-mouth disease strikes Northumberland farms
- 1969
  - Newcastle Polytechnic was established
  - The last quarry of Fell sandstone closed at Doddington

=== 1970s ===
- 1974
  - The county of Tyne and Wear was created
- 1975-81
  - Kielder Water constructed
- 1977
  - Concordia Leisure Centre in Cramlington was opened by Queen Elizabeth II
- 1979-82
  - County Hall, Morpeth constructed for Northumberland County Council

=== 1980s ===
- 1981
  - 6 November: Queen Elizabeth II Metro Bridge officially opened by Queen Elizabeth II
  - 15 November: Queen Elizabeth II Metro Bridge and new section of Metro line from Haymarket, Newcastle upon Tyne to Heworth opened to the public

=== 1990s ===
- 1992
  - Newcastle Polytechnic became Northumbria University

== 21st century ==
=== 2000s ===
- 2002
  - Mesolithic house on the coast at Howick was excavated and dated to 7,800 BC

== See also ==
- History of Northumberland
- Timeline of Newcastle upon Tyne
- Timeline of Tyne and Wear

== Sources ==
- Allsopp, Bruce; Clark, Ursula (1969). Historic Architecture of Northumberland. Newcastle upon Tyne: Oriel Press. ISBN 0-85362-062-8.
- Atkinson, Frank (1979). The Great Northern Coalfield 1700-1900. Newcastle upon Tyne: Frank Graham. ISBN 0 85983 121 3.
- Barbey, MF (1981). Civil Engineering Heritage. Northern England. London: Telford Ltd. ISBN 0-7277-0098-7.
- Beckensall, Stan (2001). Northumberland. The Power of Place. Stroud, Gloucestershire: Tempus Publishing Ltd. ISBN 0-7524-1907-2.
- Bruce, John Collingwood (1904). Lectures on Old Newcastle. Newcastle upon Tyne: Andrew Reid & Co Ltd.
- Charleton, Robert John (1899). A History of Newcastle upon Tyne from the earliest records to its formation as a city. London: Walter Scott Ltd.
- Christie, Rev James (1904). Northumberland: Its History, Its Features, and Its People (2nd ed.). Carlisle: Chas. Thurnam & Sons.
- Colls, Robert; Lancaster, Bill (2001). Newcastle upon Tyne. A Modern History. Chichester: Phillimore & Co Ltd. ISBN 1-86077-167-X.
- Donaghy, Peter; Laidler, John (2012). Discovering NewcastleGateshead. Ammanford: Sigma Leisure. ISBN 978-1-85058-913-6.
- Flowers, Anna; Histon, Vanessa (1999). Water Under the Bridges, Newcastle's Twentieth Century. Newcastle upon Tyne: Tyne Bridge Publishing. ISBN 1-85795-140-9.
- Fraser, CM; Emsley, K (1973). Tyneside. Newton Abbot: David & Charles. ISBN 0-7153-5764-6.
- Graham, Frank (1978). Newcastle. Short History and Guide. Newcastle upon Tyne: Frank Graham. ISBN 0-85983-111-6.
- Grundy, John (2022). History of Northumberland. Newcastle upon Tyne: Tyne Bridge Publishing. ISBN 9781838280970.
- Hawkes, Jane (1996). The Golden Age of Northumbria. Morpeth: Sandhill Press. ISBN 0-946098-43-3.
- Hearnshaw, FJC (1971). Newcastle-Upon-Tyne. Wakefield: SR Publishers Ltd. ISBN 0-85409-683-3.
- Hepplewhite, Peter (2002). Images of England - Newcastle upon Tyne. Stroud: Tempus Publishing Ltd. ISBN 0-7524-1598-0.
- Manders, Frank; Potts, Richard (2004). Crossing the Tyne. Nwcastle upon Tyne: Tyne Bridge Publishing. ISBN 1857951212.
- Middlebrook, Sydney (1968). Newcastle upon Tyne. Its Growth and Achievement. Wakefield: S.R. Publishers ltd.
- Newton, Diana; Pollard, AJ (2009). Newcastle and Gateshead before 1700. Chichester: Phillimore & Co Ltd. ISBN 978-1-86077-579-6.
- Rendel, G. Daphne (1898). Newcastle-on -Tyne. Its Municipal Origin and Growth. London: Edward Arnold.
- Rowland, Harry (1979). Looking Around Northumberland. Harry Rowland.
- Sadler, John; Serdiville, Rosie (2019). The Little Book of Newcastle. Stroud, Gloucestershire: The History Press. ISBN 978-0-7509-9003-5.
- Smailes, AE (1960). North England. Edinburgh: Thomas Nelson & Sons Ltd.
- Stenton, F. M. (1971). Anglo-Saxon England. Oxford, UK: Oxford University Press.
- Taylor, David (2022). 111 Places in Newcastle That You Shouldn't Miss (2nd ed.). Germany: Emons Verlag GmbH. ISBN 978-3-7408-1043-6.
- Tomlinson, William Weaver (1920). Comprehensive Guide to the County of Northumberland (10th ed.). London: The Walter Scott Publishing Co Ltd.
- Walker, Robert Fulton (1976). The Origins of Newcastle upon Tyne. Newcastle upon Tyne: Thorne's Students' Bookshop Ltd.
- Waters, I. (1999). Northumberland: England's Border Country. Contemporary Review, 275(1605), 203–210.
- Webb, Jonathan CK (2009). Tyneside from the Air. Derby: Breedon Books Publishing Co Ltd. ISBN 9781-85983-683-5.
- White, John Talbot (1973). The Scottish Border and Northumberland. London: Eyre Metheun. ISBN 0-413-30270-9.
