= Coupland (surname) =

Coupland is a surname. Notable people with the surname include:

- Antoine Coupland (born 2003), Canadian soccer player
- Diana Coupland (1928–2006), English actress
- Douglas Coupland (born 1961), Canadian writer and artist
- George Coupland (born 1959), Scottish scientist
- Henry Ethelbert Coupland (1915–1994), Canadian farmer, businessman and politician
- Jenny Coupland (born 1961), named Miss Australia in 1982
- Joe Coupland (1920–1989), Scottish footballer
- John de Coupland (died 1363), English soldier and nobleman known for capturing King David II of Scotland in battle
- Reginald Coupland (1884–1952), English historian
- Robert Coupland (1904–1968), New Zealand cricketer and civil servant
- Sarah Coupland, Australian pathologist and academic
- Sidney Coupland (1849–1930), English physician
- Tiarnie Coupland (born 1997), Australian actress, model and singer
