= Coupland, Northumberland =

Village in Northumberland, England

Coordinates: 55.575°N 2.101°W

Coupland
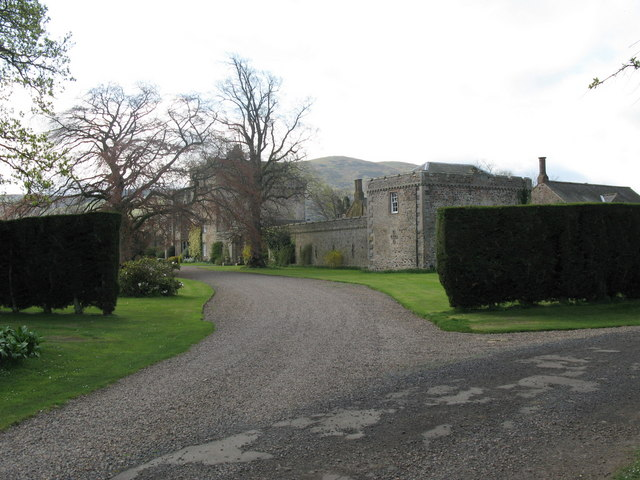
- Coupland Castle

- Location within Northumberland
- OS grid reference: NT937312
- Civil parish: Ewart
- Unitary authority: Northumberland
- Shire county: Northumberland
- Region: North East
- Country: England
- Sovereign state: United Kingdom
- Post town: WOOLER
- Postcode district: NE71
- Dialling code: 01668
- Police: Northumbria
- Fire: Northumberland
- Ambulance: North East
- UK Parliament: Berwick-upon-Tweed

Coupland is a village and former civil parish, now in the parish of Ewart, in Northumberland, England. It is on the north bank of the River Glen about 4 miles (6 km) to the northwest of Wooler. In 1951 the parish had a population of 216.

== Governance ==
Coupland is in the parliamentary constituency of Berwick-upon-Tweed. Coupland was formerly a township in the parish of Kirknewton, from 1866 Coupland was a civil parish in its own right until it was abolished on 1 April 1955 and merged with Ewart and Kirknewton.

== Landmarks ==
Coupland Castle is situated in the village and is a Grade I listed building. It is a tower house rather than a castle, and was probably built at the end of the 16th century. The tower has three storeys with an attic on top and a small projecting tower carried up the south wall.

A date stone over a fireplace in the tower engraved GW 1615 MW is thought to represent George and Mary Wallis, owners at that date. The building has been added to over the years and was restored in the 19th century, and in 1820 was extended when a three-bayed two-storied house was built adjoining the tower.

In 2020 the castle was put up for sale.
