= River Glen, Northumberland =

River in Northumberland, England

River Glen
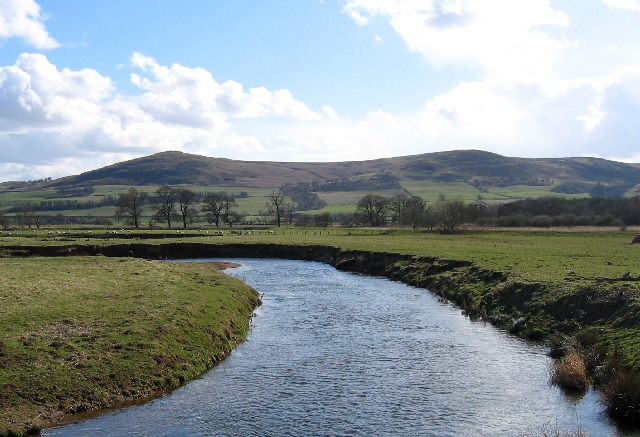
- River Glen

- Location within Northumberland

Location
- Country: United Kingdom
- County: Northumberland

Physical characteristics
- Source
  - coordinates: 55.5688°N 2.1454°W
- Mouth
  - coordinates: 55.5865°N 2.0388°W
- Length: 12 km (7.5 mi)
- Discharge
  - location: Kirknewton
  - average: 2.93 m^{3}/s (103 cu ft/s)

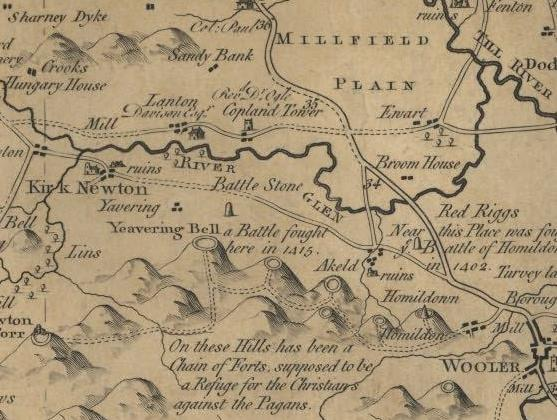
Detail from Armstrong's 1769 map of Northumberland

The River Glen is a seven mile long tributary of the River Till flowing through northern Northumberland, England, United Kingdom. The College Burn and Bowmont Water, both flowing out of the Cheviot Hills, meet near Kirknewton to form the River Glen. The Glen flows past the small settlements of Yeavering, Lanton, Coupland, Akeld, and Ewart, and through the valley of Glendale, before joining the Till.

== History ==
The area around the Glen is rich in historical and archaeological interest. Iron Age hillforts on peaks to the south of the River overlook the Anglo-Saxon settlement and palace site at Yeavering, where St. Paulinus baptised new converts and, according to St. Bede, "washed them with the water of absolution in the river Glen, which is close by" (Tomlinson, 1888, p. 504).

The vicinity of the Glen was the setting for some of the bloodiest border warfare between Scotland and England. The Battle of Humbleton Hill was fought near the River in 1402, and so was the Battle of Geteryne (Yeavering) in 1415.

=== Arthurian myth ===
A reference to a similarly named river in Historia Brittonum by the Welsh Nennius, some (Ekwal, 1928; Hunt, 2005) have hypothesized that the legendary British warrior King Arthur began his campaign against Anglo-Saxon invaders near the confluence of the Glen and Till:

Then it was, that Arthur, with all the kings and military force of Britain, fought against the Saxons. And though there were many more noble than himself, yet he was twelve times chosen their commander, and was as often conqueror. The first battle in which he was engaged, was at the mouth of the river Glein.

== Hydrology ==
Between 1966 and 2010 the flow of the Glen was measured in its lower reaches at a weir near Kirknewton. The 44-year record shows that the catchment of 200 square kilometres (77 sq mi) to the gauging station yielded an average flow of 2.93 cubic metres per second (103 cu ft/s).

== See also ==
- Battle of Humbleton Hill
- Glendale, Northumberland
- History of Northumberland
- Kirknewton, Northumberland
- Wooler
- Yeavering

== Sources ==
- Ekwall, E. (1928). English river names (reprinted 1968). Oxford, UK: Oxford University Press.
- Hunt, A. (2005). From Glein to Camlann: The life and death of King Arthur. Vortigern Studies.
- Tomlinson, W. W. (1888). Comprehensive guide to the county of Northumberland (reprinted 1968). Trowbridge, UK: Redwood.
