= Howick house =

- Location in Northumberland
- 55.454°N 1.593°W
- Location: Northumberland, England, UK
- OS grid reference: NU258178

The Howick house is a Mesolithic site located in Northumberland, England. It was found when an amateur archaeologist noticed flint tools eroding out of a sandy cliff face near the village of Howick. Investigations found a circle of substantial post holes with charcoal stains in their bases, a number of smaller stake holes, some angled in from outside a hollow, and inside the house a number of shallow hearths filled with charcoal, burnt nutshells and some fragments of bone. Radiocarbon dating of the charred hazelnut shells established that the building was constructed about 7600 BC and occupied for about 100 years, which led to the find being called "Britain's oldest house". This title was disputed in 2010 when the discovery of the even older 'house-structure' at Star Carr in North Yorkshire was announced.

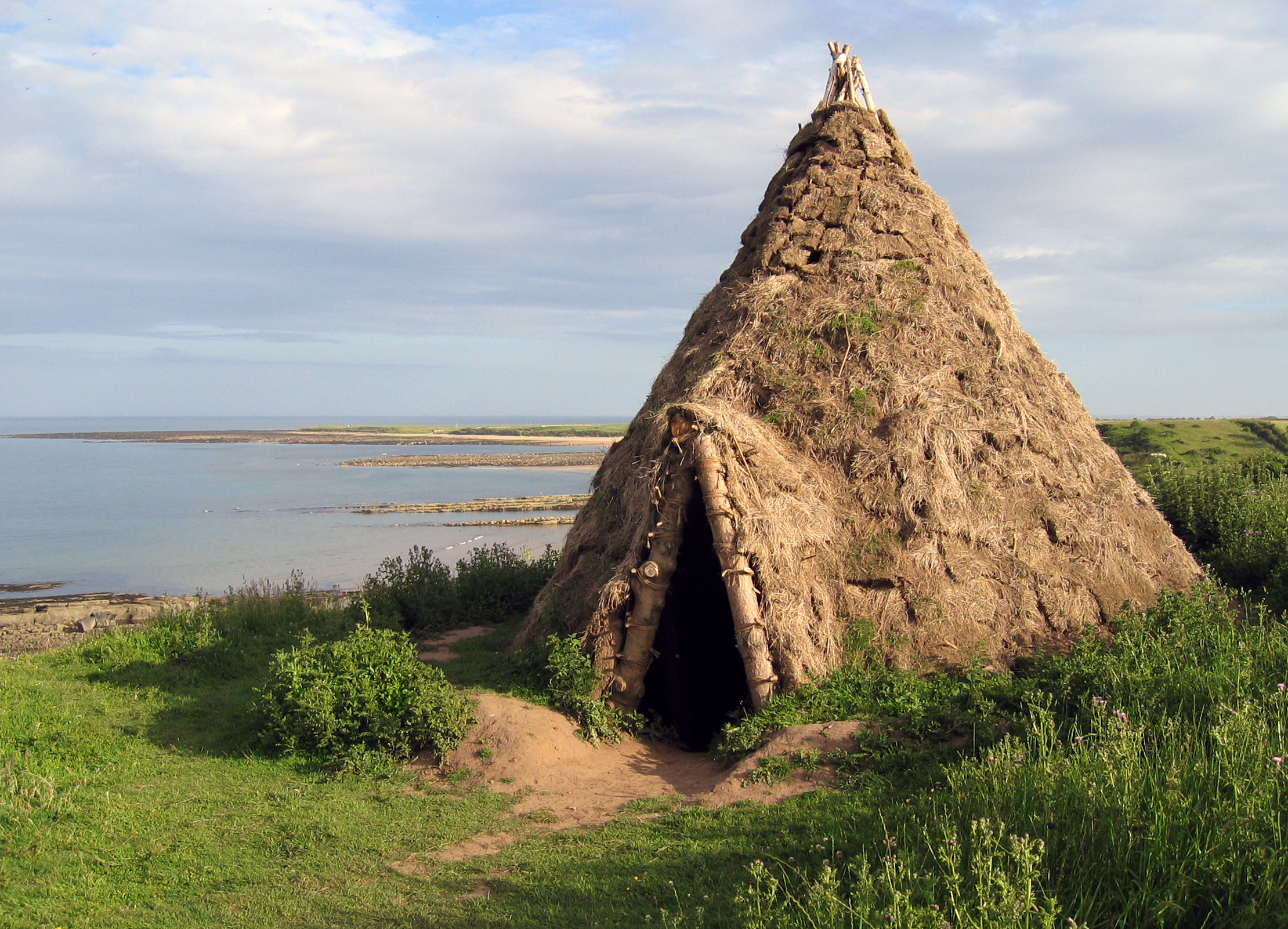
Reconstructed Mesolithic round-house Replica of a 10,000 year old round-house which was excavated from a nearby cliff-top site which had been discovered by the identification of flint artifacts in the eroding cliffs by amateur archaeologists.

Some of the hearths showed signs only of nut roasting, and the numbers of shells suggested that food was cooked here in quantity, perhaps to preserve it for times of scarcity. Together with the very substantial construction shown by the size of post holes, this led to the view that the house was occupied permanently rather than being used on a transient or seasonal basis as expected during the Mesolithic period. Charred hazelnut shells have been found at several other sites from this period, including Cramond, but their smaller stake holes were interpreted as remains of a temporary encampment.

The interpretation that this was a permanent residence for hunter-gatherers is supported by analysis that Howick is a place where natural resources would have allowed all-year-round occupation. Its coastal position provided animals, flint for tools, wood for construction and fuel, fish, seals, sea birds and their eggs, shellfish and a nearby source of fresh water that was available at the time of occupation. Many sites from this time are coastal, but the particular circumstances found here and the evidence of ceremonial ritual from the site at Star Carr in Yorkshire, only 100 miles away, are interpreted as indicating that Mesolithic hunter-gatherers were capable of establishing permanent settlements.

== See also ==
- History of Northumberland
