= Battle of Homildon Hill =

Conflict between English and Scottish armies in England, in 1402

Coordinates: 55.559°N 2.052°W

Battle of Holmedon Hill
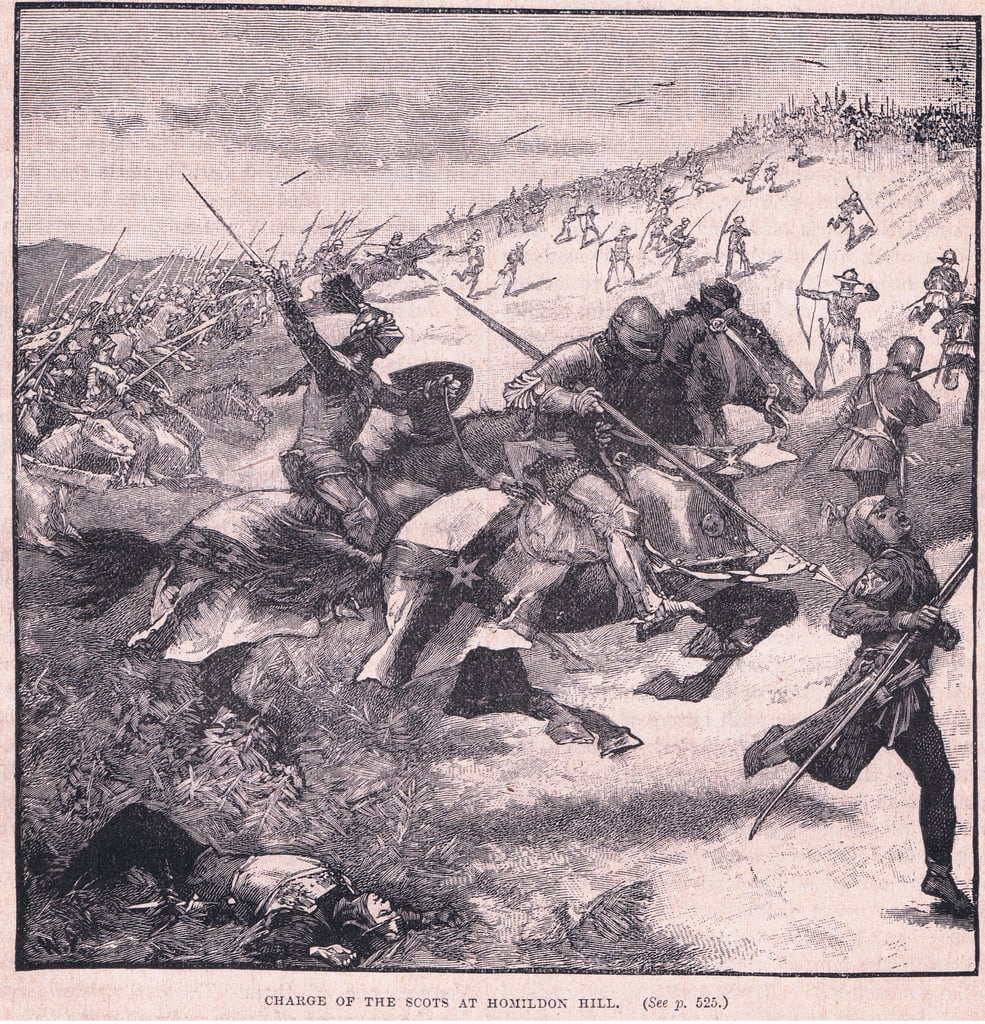
- Charge of the Scots at Homildon Hill AD 1402 (illustration by Walter Paget, c. 1900)
Date	14 September 1402
Location	Wooler, Northumberland, England
Result	English victory

Belligerents
Kingdom of England	Kingdom of Scotland

Commanders and leaders
Earl of Northumberland; Henry 'Hotspur' Percy; Earl of Dunbar	Earl of Douglas (POW)

Strength
12,000	12,000

Casualties and losses
Somewhat low	Very high

The Battle of Holmedon Hill or Battle of Homildon Hill was a conflict between English and Scottish armies on 14 September 1402 in Northumberland, England. The battle was recounted in William Shakespeare's Henry IV, Part 1. Although Humbleton Hill is the modern name of the site, over the centuries it has been variously named Homildon, Hameldun, Holmedon, and Homilheugh.

== Background ==
During the time leading to the repudiation of the Truce of Leulinghem, both Kingdoms began to raid the other. On 22 June 1402, a small force backed by the Scots government, returning from one such raid, was attacked and defeated by George Dunbar, the Earl of March's son, at the Battle of Nesbit Moor, at which no quarter was given.

Archibald Douglas, 4th Earl of Douglas, arguably the most militarily powerful man in Scotland, and a key part of the Duke of Albany's administration, used the pretext of Nesbit Moor to lead a punitive expedition into England. With Murdoch of Fife, Albany's son, Douglas's army marched as far as Newcastle to avenge the battle. At the head of 10,000 men, he laid waste to the whole of Northumberland.

== Battle ==
March persuaded Henry Percy, 1st Earl of Northumberland, and his son Henry "Hotspur" to lie in wait for the returning Scots at Wooler. Once Douglas's men had made camp at Milfield, relatively low ground, the English army rushed to attack. The Scots, however, had keen sentries and the army was able to retreat to the higher ground of Homildon Hill and organise into traditional Schiltron formations; Douglas had not learned from the lesson of his great uncle's defeat at the Battle of Halidon Hill seventy years previously. The Schiltrons presented a large target for the English Longbowmen, and the formations started to break. A hundred men, under Sir John Swinton of the Swintons of that Ilk, chose to charge the enemy saying: "Better to die in the mellay than be shot down like deer". All perished. It has been suggested that Douglas hesitated to signal the advance of his main force, and when he did, it was too little too late. Douglas's mauled army met the as yet unbloodied English men at arms, and were routed. Many of Douglas's leading captains were captured, including his kinsman George Douglas, 1st Earl of Angus, Thomas Dunbar, 5th Earl of Moray and Murdoch of Fife. Douglas himself was captured having been wounded five times, including the loss of an eye, despite the fact his armour had allegedly taken three years to make.

== Aftermath ==
With so many of the Scots leaders and chivalry taken prisoner, Albany was left in a precarious position militarily if not politically. It was only due to King Henry's internal and Welsh problems that the English did not press home their victory with a full-scale invasion of Scotland. Henry IV was keen that so many able soldiers should not return to Scotland to fight against him, so refused to allow those who held noble captives to ransom them. This act became one of the many grievances that the Percys had with the Crown. In 1403 they allied themselves with Owain Glyndŵr, and went into open rebellion against the English king. Hotspur set his prisoners free, as there was by now no chance of remuneration for them, and many including Douglas decided to join forces with him. Indeed, Douglas fought, and was again badly wounded, at Hotspur's final fight at the Battle of Shrewsbury.

Sir John Mowbray of Barnbougle, Laird of Dalmeny, was knighted by Sir Thomas Erskine at the battle.

== As recounted by Shakespeare ==
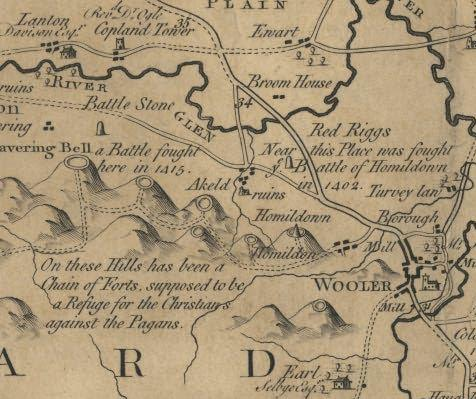
A detail from Armstrong's Map of Northumberland (1769) showing Humbleton (Holmedon) Hill

Here is a dear, a true industrious friend,
Sir Walter Blunt, new lighted from his horse.
Stain’d with the variation of each soil
Betwixt that Holmedon and this seat of ours;
And he hath brought us smooth and welcome news.
The Earl of Douglas is discomfited:
Ten thousand bold Scots, two and twenty knights,
Balk’d in their own blood did Sir Walter see
On Holmedon’s plains. Of prisoners, Hotspur took
Mordake the Earl of Fife, and eldest son
To beaten Douglas; and the Earl of Athol,
Of Murray, Angus, and Menteith:
And is not this an honourable spoil?
A gallant prize? ha, cousin, is it not?

— William Shakespeare, Henry IV, Part 1, act 1, scene 1.

== Notable casualties ==
- Sir Adam de Gordon, Scottish Captain, killed in action.
- Sir John Swinton, 14th of that Ilk, Scottish Captain, killed in action.
- Sir John Livingstone of Callendar
- Sir Alexander Ramsay of Dalhousie

== Notable captives ==
- Archibald Douglas, 4th Earl of Douglas
- Murdoch Stewart, Earl of Fife
- Thomas Dunbar, 5th Earl of Moray
- George Douglas, 1st Earl of Angus
- Henry Sinclair, 2nd Earl of Orkney

== Battle site ==
The site of the battle, Humbleton Hill, is now located within the Northumberland National Park. The hill contains the remains of an Iron Age hillfort at the summit, built some 1,500 years before the battle. During the medieval period the sides of the ruined fort were apparently used for summer settlements and sheep shelters.

The Battle Stone at grid reference NT968295 was traditionally thought to commemorate the 1402 battle, but is actually a standing stone dating to the Bronze Age.

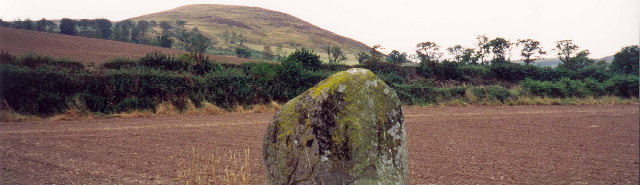
The Bendor stone at the site of the battle with Akeld Hill in the background. Humbleton Hill is out of shot to the left.

== See also ==
- Yeavering
- Yeavering Bell
- Battle of Yeavering
- History of Northumberland
- List of places in Northumberland
- Nisbet, Berwickshire, Scottish Borders, Scotland
- List of places in the Scottish Borders
