= Westnewton, Northumberland =

Hamlet in Northumberland, England

Coordinates: 55.568°N 2.152°W

Westnewton
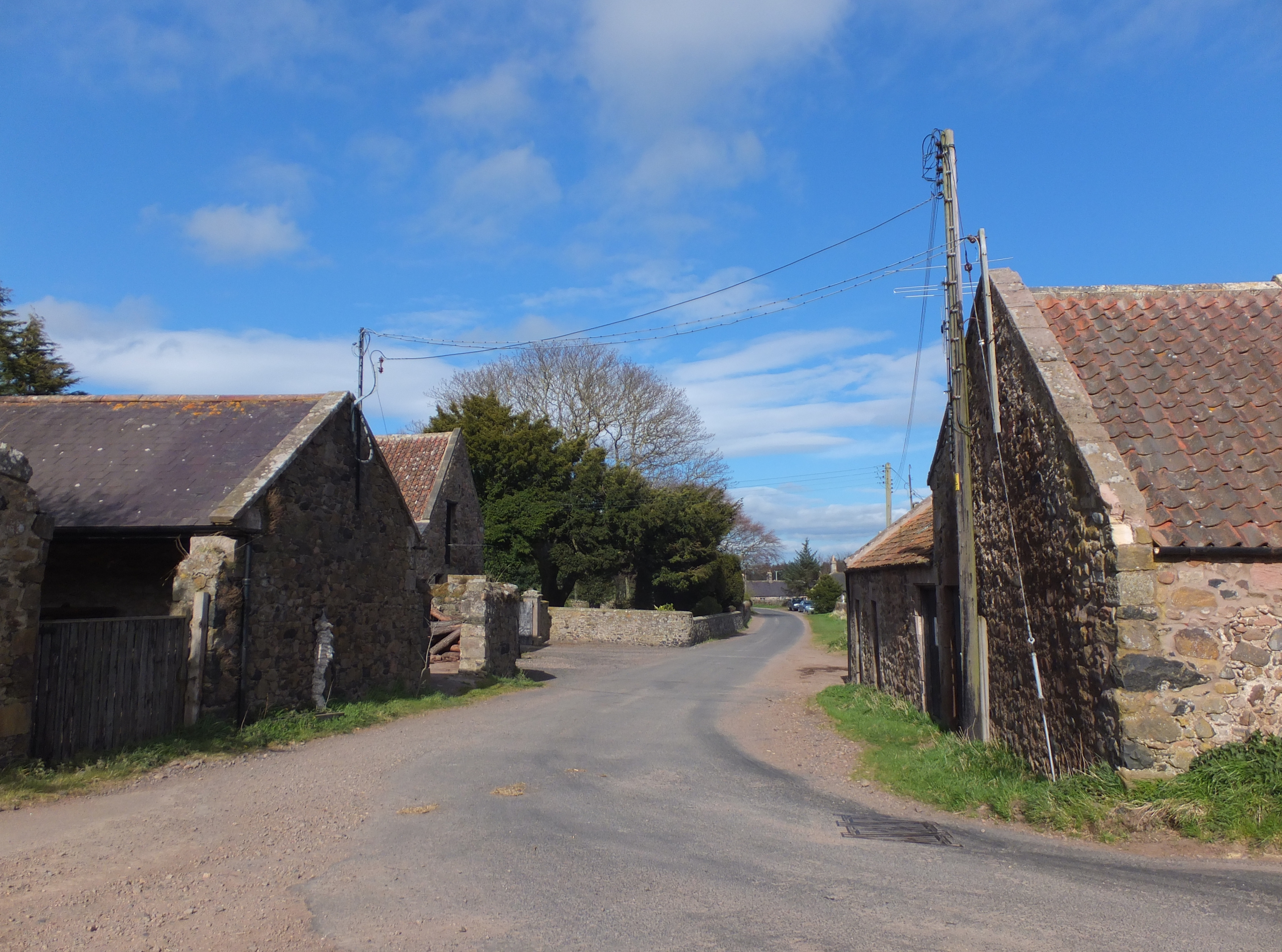

- Location within Northumberland
- OS grid reference: NT905305
- Civil parish: Kirknewton
- Unitary authority: Northumberland
- Ceremonial county: Northumberland
- Region: North East
- Country: England
- Sovereign state: United Kingdom
- Post town: WOOLER
- Postcode district: NE71
- Dialling code: 01668
- Police: Northumbria
- Fire: Northumberland
- Ambulance: North East
- UK Parliament: Berwick-upon-Tweed

Westnewton is a small hamlet comprising around 8 houses and a manse to the west of the village of Kirknewton, in the civil parish of Kirknewton, in the county of Northumberland, England.

== Governance ==
Westnewton is in the parliamentary constituency of Berwick-upon-Tweed. Westnewton was formerly a township in the parish of Kirknewton, in 1866 Westnewton became a civil parish, on 1 April 1955 the parish was abolished and merged with Kirknewton. In 1951 the civil parish had a population of 42.
