= Glendale, Northumberland =

Valley in Northumberland., England

Glendale
- Valley
- Location in Northumberland
- Coordinates: 55.595083°N 2.105°W
- Grid position: NT935335
- Location: Northumberland, England, UK

Glendale is the name of a valley in North Northumberland that runs from the Cheviot Hills at Kirknewton onto the Milfield Plain, formed by the River Glen. However, the name is generally taken to indicate the area around the town of Wooler.

== History ==
In August 1557, England was invaded by Lord James and Robert Stewart (two sons of James V) and Lord Home who brought artillery against Ford Castle and burnt farmhouses in the "ten towns of Glendale".

== In fiction ==
Glendale gave rise to the fictional "Greendale", the area in which the Postman Pat stories are set. Author John Cunliffe adapted the name in his series of children's books after working in the area as a mobile library driver for many years. Many of the place names in Postman Pat can be linked back to names of places both in this area, and Longsleddale near Kendal, Cumbria, where he also lived.
