= Joe Coupland =

Scottish footballer (1920–1989)

Personal information
- Full name: Joseph Coupland
- Date of birth: 10 April 1920
- Place of birth: Glasgow, Scotland
- Date of death: 14 March 1989 (aged 68)
- Place of death: Hartford, Connecticut, United States
- Position: Full back

Senior career*
Years	Team	Apps	(Gls)
- Maryhill Harp
1946–1948	Dunfermline Athletic	46	(0)
1948–1950	Ayr United	37	(0)
1950–1952	Bradford City	18	(0)
1952–1954	Carlisle United	3	(0)
1954–1956	Greenock Morton	13	(0)
Total		117	(0)
- * Club domestic league appearances and goals

Joe Coupland (10 April 1920 – 14 March 1989) was a Scottish professional footballer who played as a full back.

== Career ==
Born in Glasgow, Coupland played for Maryhill Harp, Dunfermline Athletic, Ayr United, Bradford City, Carlisle United and Greenock Morton.
