= Yeavering Bell =

Hill in Northumberland, England

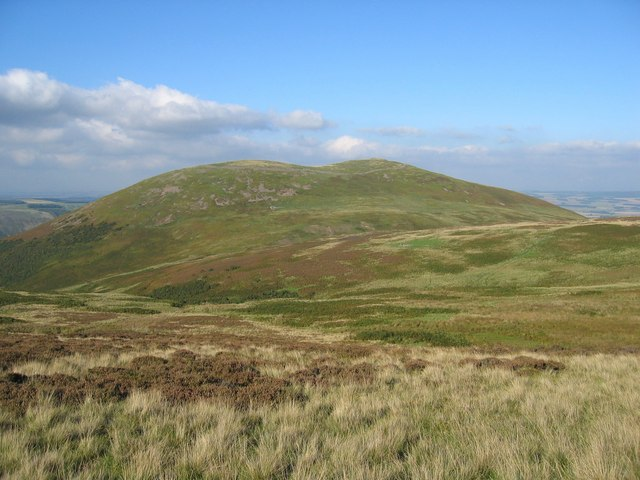
- Looking north to Yeavering Bell

Highest point
- Coordinates: 55.557°N 2.114°W

Geography
- Location within Northumberland
- Location: Northumberland, England, UK
- OS grid: NT929292

Yeavering Bell is a twin-peaked hill near the River Glen in north Northumberland, England, to the west of Wooler, and forming part of the Cheviot Hills. The summit, 1,158 feet (353 metres) above sea level, is encircled by the wall of a late-prehistoric hillfort, a tribal centre of the Votadini called in Brythonic and Old Welsh Din Gefron, from which the name stems (Old English *geafringa-).

The hillfort encloses an area of approximately 12 acres (4.9 ha) and is enclosed by a stone wall, upwards of 10 ft (3.0 m) thick, having four entrances, one of which is defended by a guard-house; and within this area is an inner fort, excavated out of the rock, of an oval form, measuring 13 ft (4.0 m) across at the widest part. On the sides of the hill, and in a high valley between the Bell and the next hill, called Whitelaw, there are many remains of stone huts rudely flagged, some in groups surrounded by rampiers (ramparts), and others isolated. Barrows, too, are numerous here.

The hillfort enclosure was constructed in two phases, according to a survey by English Heritage. The 'roundhouses' within the fort suggests communal living but these need not all have been dwellings. The differing size of these buildings may have indicated the status of their original occupants.

Yeavering Bell overlooks the important Angle site of Yeavering in the valley just to the north, which was mentioned by Bede in his Ecclesiastical History of the English People. The outlines of the wooden royal hall and assembly building have been marked out in the grass at Yeavering, and can be picked out from the slopes of Yeavering Bell.

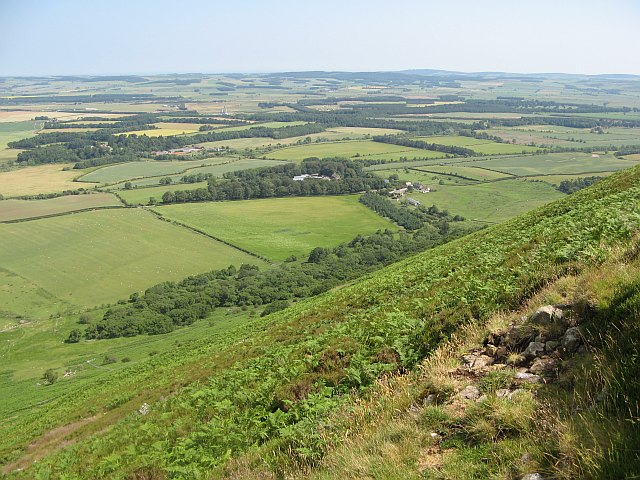
Steep northern slopes of Yeavering Bell

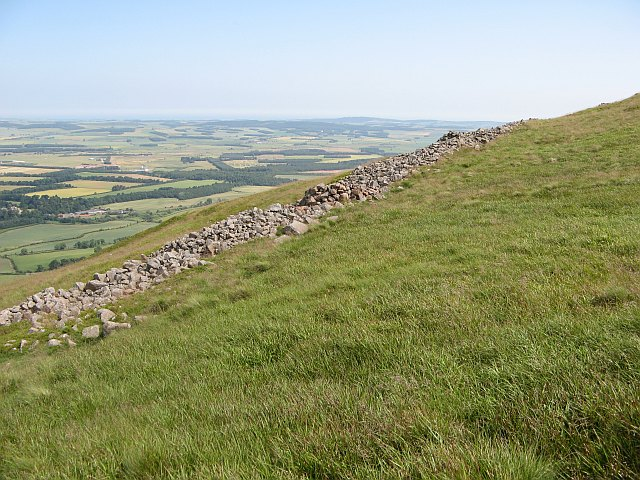
View north-northeast from Yeavering Bell

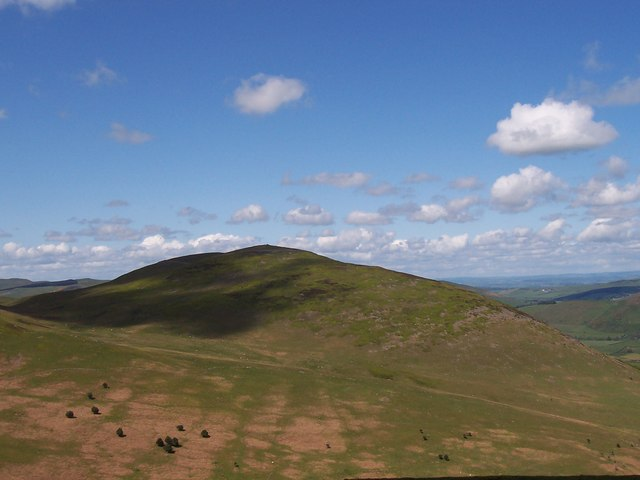
North-east slope seen from near to White Law

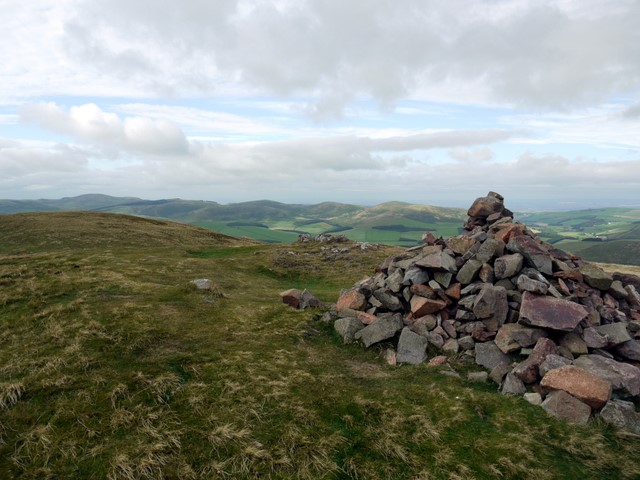
Summit cairn

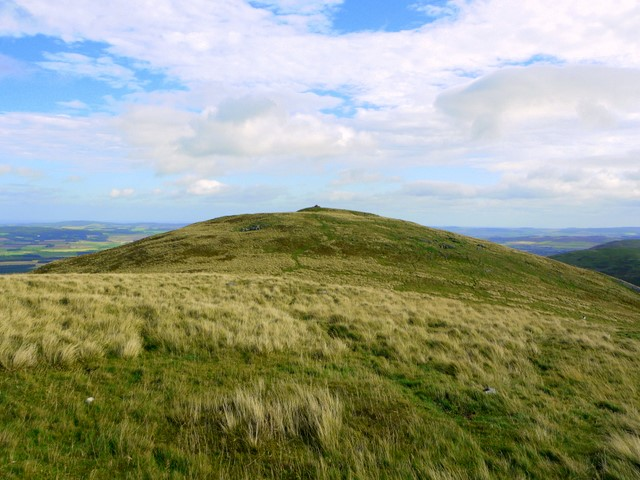
Summit

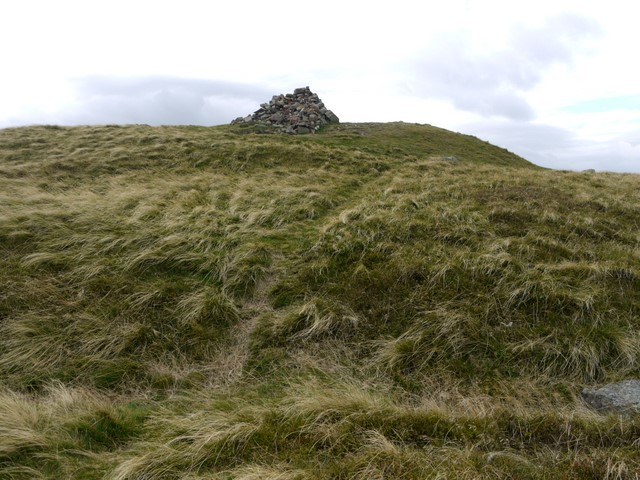
Summit

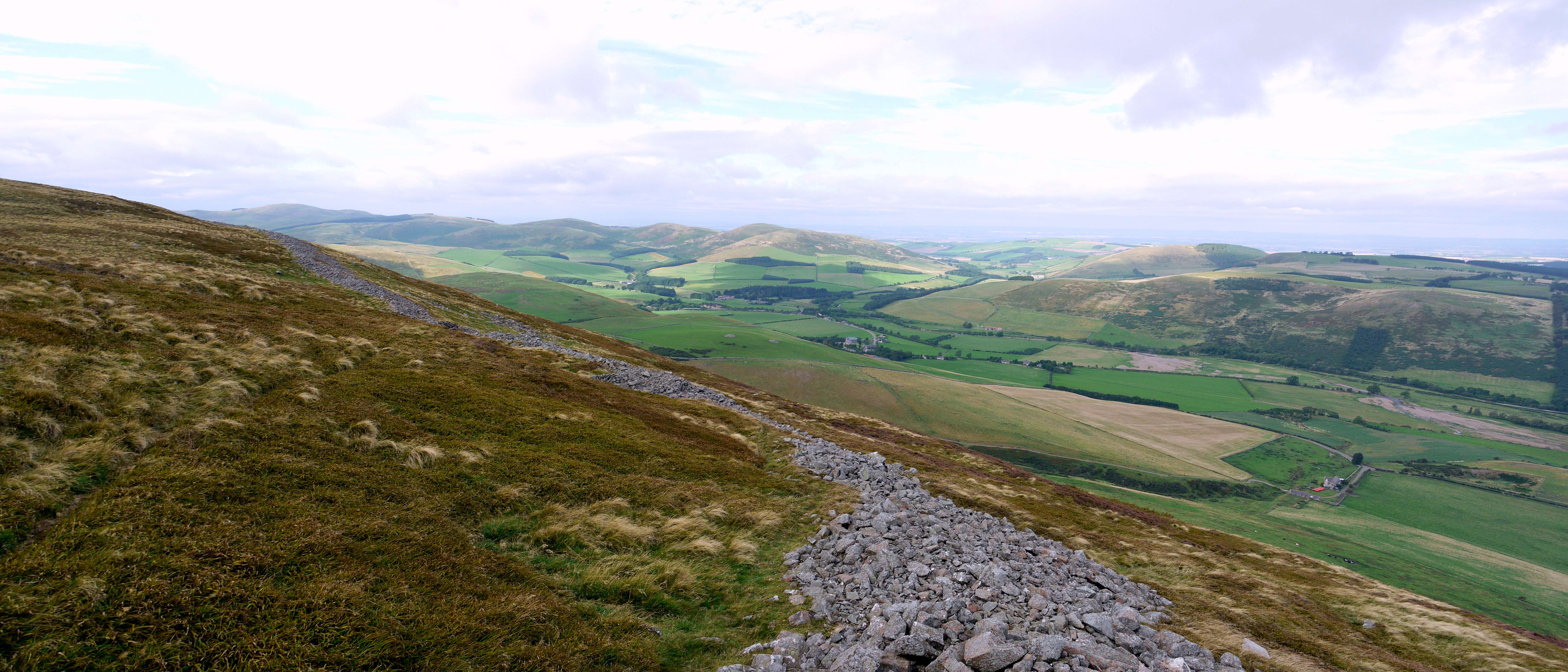
Hill fort

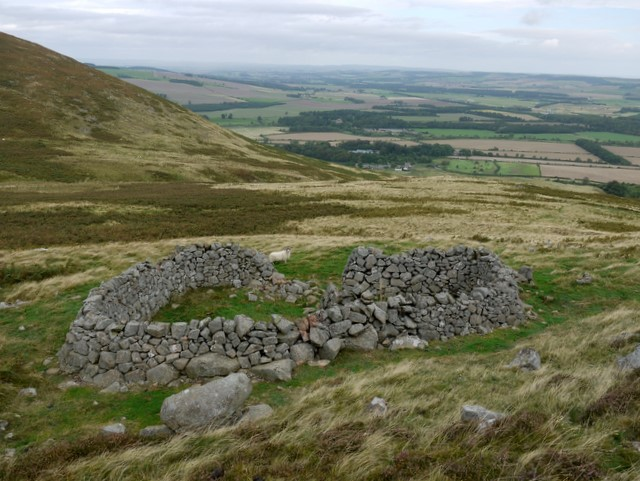
Sheepfold below Yeavering Bell

== Bibliography ==
- Oswald A and Pearson T (2005) Yeavering Bell Hillfort. 98-126 in Frodsham and O’Brien.
- Pearson T (1998) Yeavering Bell Hillfort, Northumberland. English Heritage: Archaeological Investigation Report Series AI/3/2001.
- W & R Chambers (1869), the Book of Days, December 17
