= Coupland Castle =

Grade I listed castle in Northumberland, England

- Northumberland, England
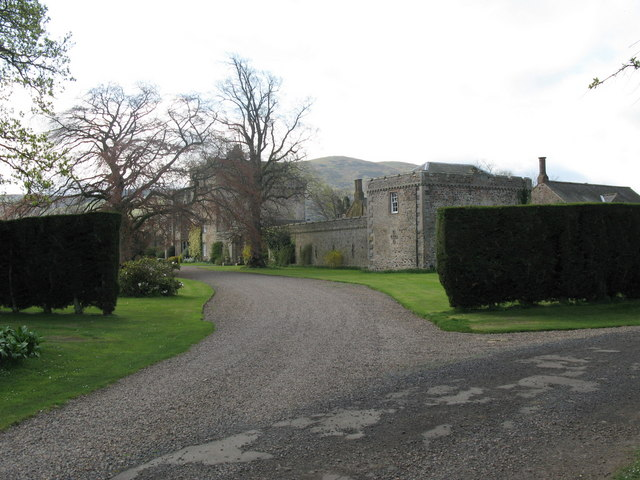
- Coupland Castle, 2007

Location
- Location in Northumberland
- Coordinates: 55.574°N 2.103°W
- Grid reference: NT936312

Coupland Castle is situated in the village of Coupland, 4 miles (6 km) to the north-west of Wooler, Northumberland, England. It is a Grade I listed building. The Grade I listed "castle" is actually a tower house "built after 1584, with irregular later additions".

== History ==
Coupland Castle is a tower house rather than a castle, and was probably built at the end of the 16th century, sometime after 1584. The tower has three storeys, with an attic on top and a small projecting tower carried up the south wall. Between the two towers, the entrance to the castle with the date 1594 inscribed on the door jamb. The building is made of rubble from different stone types. In addition, the building has a slate roof.

A date-stone over a fireplace in the tower engraved 'GW 1615 MW' is thought to represent George and Mary Wallis, owners at that date.

Other historic features include the upper spiral staircase, designed to be defended by a left-handed swordsman, and a resident ghost who was said to haunt the Court Room, before reputedly being exorcised in 1925. A separate farmhouse was added to the south-west of the tower in the 18th century.

In 1713, the property was purchased from the Wallis family by Sir Chaloner Ogle a successful naval officer. During his command of HMS Swallow (1703) against the notorious pirate Bartholomew Roberts in the Battle of Cape Lopez in February 1722, Roberts was killed.

The castle has been added to over the years and was restored in the 19th century. In 1820 it was extended when a three-bay two-storey house was built adjoining the tower.

The Bates family owned the estate in the 18th century. Elizabeth Bates, heiress to the estate, married Matthew Culley (born 1731), the noted agriculturist, in 1783. In 1820 the house was the residence of a later Matthew Culley, High Sheriff of Northumberland in that year. The Culleys sold the estate in 1928. Coupland Castle was designated a Grade I listed building on 21 September 1951. The listing states that significant alterations had been completed in the 16th, 17th, and 18th centuries and then, circa 1820-25.

Robin Jell bought the property in 1979 and lived there with his second wife Fiona. Jell died in 2019 and in 2020, the castle was put up for sale. Jell had restored the 13,747sq ft main house; the property included a three-bedroom cottage and a lodge, as well as a series of outbuildings.
