= Robert Coupland =

New Zealand cricketer

Personal information
- Full name: Robert William Coupland
- Born: 24 September 1904; Christchurch, New Zealand
- Died: 29 September 1968 (aged 64); Sydney, Australia
- Batting: Right-handed
- Bowling: Right-arm off-spin

Domestic team information
- Years: Team
- 1930/31–1932/33: Otago

Career statistics
Competition	First-class
Matches	7
Runs scored	165
Batting average	15.00
100s/50s	0/0
Top score	32*
Balls bowled	571
Wickets	14
Bowling average	20.14
5 wickets in innings	0
10 wickets in match	0
Best bowling	4/41
Catches/stumpings	5/–
- Source: ESPNcricinfo, 31 July 2020

Robert William Coupland (24 September 1904 – 29 September 1968) was a New Zealand cricketer and senior tourism official. He played seven first-class matches for Otago between 1930 and 1933.

== Life and career ==
Bob Coupland was born in Christchurch, where he attended West Christchurch District High School. He was a medium-paced off-spin bowler and useful batsman in the lower order.

After three seasons playing District Cricket in Melbourne, where he also represented Victoria at rugby union, he returned to New Zealand and had a successful season in Wanganui senior cricket before moving to Invercargill in 1929. In his first match in Invercargill club cricket he took 9 for 15. He represented Southland, captaining the team in a two-day match against the touring MCC team in 1929–30. He "turned the ball prodigiously" and took 7 for 86 in MCC's only innings.

Later in 1930 Coupland was transferred in his work to Dunedin, and began playing for Otago. His best performances for Otago came in the match against Auckland in 1932–33, when he scored 32 not out and took 4 for 41 in the second innings.

Coupland managed the office of the Government Tourist Department in Dunedin. He was transferred to Christchurch in September 1933 to manage the office there. He played no further first-class cricket, although he continued to play senior club cricket in Christchurch and represented Canterbury in minor matches. Playing for Canterbury against South Canterbury in 1937–38 he took 8 for 17 including a hat-trick. In April 1938 he was transferred to the head office of the Tourist Department in Wellington, where he continued to play senior club cricket into the 1940s. In August 1946 he was appointed the New Zealand tourism department's regional manager for the southern states of Australia, based in Melbourne. In 1953, Coupland was awarded the Queen Elizabeth II Coronation Medal.
