= Kirknewton, Northumberland =

Village in Northumberland, England

Coordinates: 55.5670°N 2.1400°W

Kirknewton
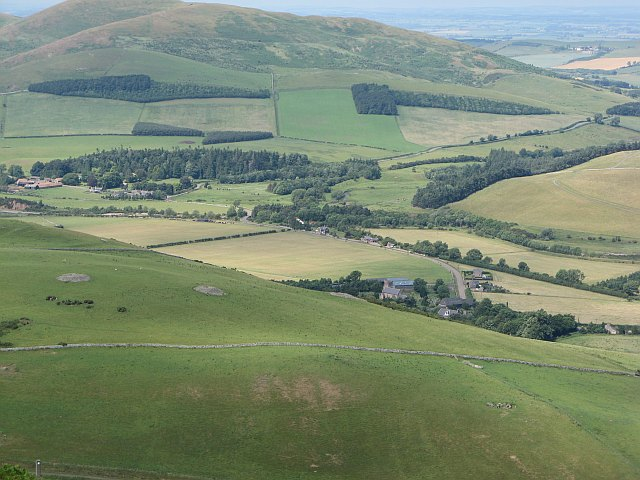
- Kirknewton from Yeavering Bell

- Location within Northumberland
- Population: 108 (2001 census)
- OS grid reference: NT912303
- Unitary authority: Northumberland
- Ceremonial county: Northumberland
- Region: North East
- Country: England
- Sovereign state: United Kingdom
- Post town: Wooler
- Postcode district: NE71
- Dialling code: 01668
- Police: Northumbria
- Fire: Northumberland
- Ambulance: North East
- UK Parliament: North Northumberland

Kirknewton is a Northumbrian village in the north of the county of Northumberland, about 6 miles (10 km) from the town of Wooler and roughly the same distance to the Scottish Borders. The village lies in the valley of Glendale, which takes its name from the River Glen, whose source at the confluence of the Bowmont Water and the College Burn lies at the west end of the village. The population as taken at the 2011 Census was less than 100. Details are maintained in the parish of Akeld.

== Demography ==
The parish of Kirknewton was one of the geographically largest in the United Kingdom, but one of the smallest in terms of population, with a count of 108 residents (56 female, 52 male) in the 2001 UK Census. Most residents live in the villages of Kirknewton, Westnewton and Hethpool, with the remainder scattered in remote farms and steadings, many of which are now holiday properties. Prior to the 2011 Census, the parish merged with neighbouring Akeld.

== Hethpool ==
The name Hethpool derives from "Pool at Hetha", from the name of Great Heath, a nearby hill rising to 343 metres (1,125 ft) OD. Alternatively, 'heath pool'. A suburb of Adelaide, South Australia, is known as Heathpool after the first European settler in that area, George Reed, who came from Hethpool/Heathpool in Northumberland.

== Economy ==
Employment in Kirknewton is mainly based around agriculture, although following decline in this industry, most residents either work in the local towns of Wooler or Berwick-upon-Tweed or are retired. The area has a reasonable tourist industry due to the Northumberland National Park which borders the village, and the area's outstanding natural beauty.

== Transport ==
The village of Kirknewton used to be a station on the Alnwick to Cornhill railway, run by the LNER. This branchline carried passengers and goods until the 1950s, when it became uneconomical to run due to dwindling passenger numbers, a competing bus service, and a number of storms which had destroyed parts of the line. The station itself and the station master's house still stand and are used as private residences.

Today, Glen Valley Tours operate the 266 bus service every Wednesday (2 buses per day) from Wooler to Kirknewton and other surrounding villages.

== Education ==
Kirknewton School originally stood near the church. It was one of the earliest schools to be purpose built in Northumberland. It dated from 1794 (the vestry minutes showing the decision to build the school can be viewed in the archives at Woodhorn) and enabled some education to be available for young children. The school was enlarged in 1886, possibly to cater for the larger numbers of children who would need places after the railway came through Kirknewton. There was a stationmaster with his family and three railway cottages together with a railway cottage at Yeavering, all with families and within the school catchment. Built on part of the glebe land in the late 18th century, the school always had connections with the church. In 1964 a new school opened and the old school became the village hall. The new school operated as a Church of England Aided Primary School for 4-11 year olds until 1981, after which – in the county of Northumberland's shift to a three-tier education system – it became a 'First' School, for 4-9 year olds, causing a sudden and dramatic fall in pupil numbers. The old school was eventually knocked down in 1999 and replaced with a new hall which opened in 2001. The school, sadly, did not survive much longer. Despite campaigning by parents, the school eventually closed in 2004, with the four remaining pupils going to nearby Ford First School. The school building has since been demolished, however the site still serves young people as an outdoor centre for the Girl Guides.

The original school building, which became the Village Hall, was itself demolished and replaced with a new purpose-build hall in the early 2000s. This is used for village events on a regular basis, and by a number of local groups and societies.

== Religious sites ==
The church of St Gregory the Great is situated in the middle of the village. Parts of the church date back to Norman times, and it is famous for a carving of the Adoration of the Magi. The carving, on the wall of one of the oldest parts of the church, depicts the Magi, apparently in kilts. The vaulted chancel was rebuilt in 1490. However, Christianity has been practised here long before this. In the 7th century, Saint Paulinus baptised Anglo-Saxon King Edwin of Northumbria at York, and subsequently many of his followers in the River Glen at Gefrin, nearby. A monument known as the Gefrin Stone is erected at this location.

== Notable people ==
- The social reformer Josephine Butler was born at Milfield House, about six miles from Wooler. She is buried in the village churchyard.
- Ann Lambton, usually known as A.K.S. Lambton or "Nancy" Lambton, the historian of medieval and early modern Persia lived in the village.

== Sources ==
- Allsopp, Bruce; Clark, Ursula (1969). Historic Architecture of Northumberland. Newcastle upon Tyne: Oriel Press. ISBN 0 85362 062 8.
