= Battle of Yeavering =

1415 battle of the Anglo-Scottish Wars

Coordinates: 55°34′01″N 2°06′46″W

- Part of the Anglo-Scottish Wars
Date	22 July 1415
Location	Yeavering, Northumberland, England
Result	English victory

Belligerents
Kingdom of England	Kingdom of Scotland

Commanders and leaders
Robert Umfraville	Unknown

Strength
440	4,000

The Battle of Yeavering (or Battle of Geteryne) was fought in 1415 between English and Scottish forces near Yeavering in Northumberland. A small English force consisting of 440 men led by the Earl of Westmoreland defeated 4000 Scots. Fought in the same year as the Battle of Agincourt, which famously demonstrated the efficacy of the longbow against cavalry, it is notable that the English side at Yeavering consisted mostly of archers.

The site is marked by a battle stone, probably originally a Bronze Age standing stone.

== See also ==
- Battle of Homildon Hill
