= History of Northumberland =

History of English county

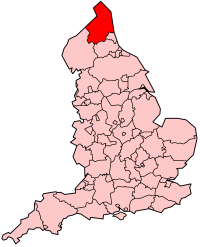
Northumberland, as its boundaries are today, shown here within England

Northumberland, England's northernmost county, is a land where Roman occupiers once guarded a walled frontier, Anglian invaders fought with Celtic natives, and Norman lords built castles to suppress rebellion and defend a contested border with Scotland. The present-day county is a vestige of an independent kingdom that once stretched from Edinburgh to the Humber, hence its name, meaning literally 'north of the Humber'. Reflecting its tumultuous past, Northumberland has more castles than any other county in England, and the greatest number of recognised battle sites. Once an economically important region that supplied much of the coal that powered the industrial revolution, Northumberland is now a primarily rural county with a small and gradually shrinking population.

== Prehistory ==
Rock art near West Horton

As attested by many instances of rock art, the Northumberland region has a rich prehistory. Archeologists have studied a Mesolithic structure at Howick, which dates to 7500 BC and was identified as Britain's oldest house until it lost this title in 2010 when the discovery of the even older Star Carr house in North Yorkshire was announced, which dates to 8770 BC. They have also found tools, ornaments, building structures and cairns dating to the bronze and iron ages, when the area was occupied by Brythonic Celtic peoples who had migrated from continental Europe, most likely the Votadini whose territory stretched from Edinburgh and the Firth of Forth to Northumberland. It is not clear where the boundary between the Votadini and the other large tribe, the Brigantes, was, although it probably frequently shifted as a result of wars and as smaller tribes and communities changed allegiances. Unlike neighbouring tribes, Votadini farms were surrounded by large walls, banks and ditches and the people made offerings of fine metal objects, but never wore massive armlets. There are also at least three very large hillforts in their territory (Yeavering Bell, Eildon Hill and Traprain Law, the latter two now in Scotland), each was located on the top of a prominent hill or mountain. The hillforts may have been used for over a thousand years by this time as places of refuge and as places for meetings for political and religious ceremonies. Duddo Five Stones in North Northumberland and the Goatstones near Hadrian's Wall are stone circles dating from the Bronze Age.

== Roman occupation ==
A section of Shepherd's (1923) map of Roman Britain

When Gnaeus Julius Agricola was appointed Roman governor of Britain in 78 AD, most of northern Britain was still controlled by native British tribes. During his governorship Agricola extended Roman control north of Eboracum (York) and into what is now Scotland. Roman settlements, garrisons and roads were established throughout the Northumberland region.

The northern frontier of the Roman occupation fluctuated between Pons Aelius (now Newcastle) and the Forth. Hadrian's Wall, built to define and defend the northern frontier of Roman Britain was built between AD 122 and 128. The Romans had started the construction of the Antonine Wall in AD 142, a more northerly defensive border lying between the Forth and Clyde. However, by 164 they abandoned the Antonine Wall to consolidate defences at Hadrian's Wall.

Two important Roman roads in the region were the Stanegate and Dere Street, the latter extending through the Cheviot Hills to locations well north of the Tweed. Located at the intersection of these two roads, Coria (Corbridge), a Roman supply-base, was the most northerly large town in the Roman Empire. The Roman forts of Vercovicium (Housesteads) on Hadrian's Wall, and Vindolanda (Chesterholm) built to guard the Stanegate, had extensive civil settlements surrounding them.

The Celtic peoples living in the region between the Tyne and the Forth were known to the Romans as the Votadini. When not under direct Roman rule, they functioned as a friendly client kingdom, a somewhat porous buffer against the more warlike Picts to the north.

The gradual Roman withdrawal from Britain in the 5th century led to a poorly documented age of conflict and chaos as different peoples contested territories in northern Britain.

=== Archaeology ===
Nearly 2000-year-old Roman boxing gloves were uncovered at Vindolanda in 2017 by the Vidolanda Trust experts led by Dr Andrew Birley. According to the Guardian, being similar in style and function to the full-hand modern boxing gloves, these two gloves found at Vindolanda look like leather bands and date back to 120 AD. It is suggested that based on their difference from gladiator gloves warriors using this type of gloves had no purpose to kill each other. These gloves were probably used in a sport for promoting fighting skills. The gloves are currently displayed at Vindolanda's museum.

== Anglian Kingdoms of Deira, Bernicia and Northumbria ==
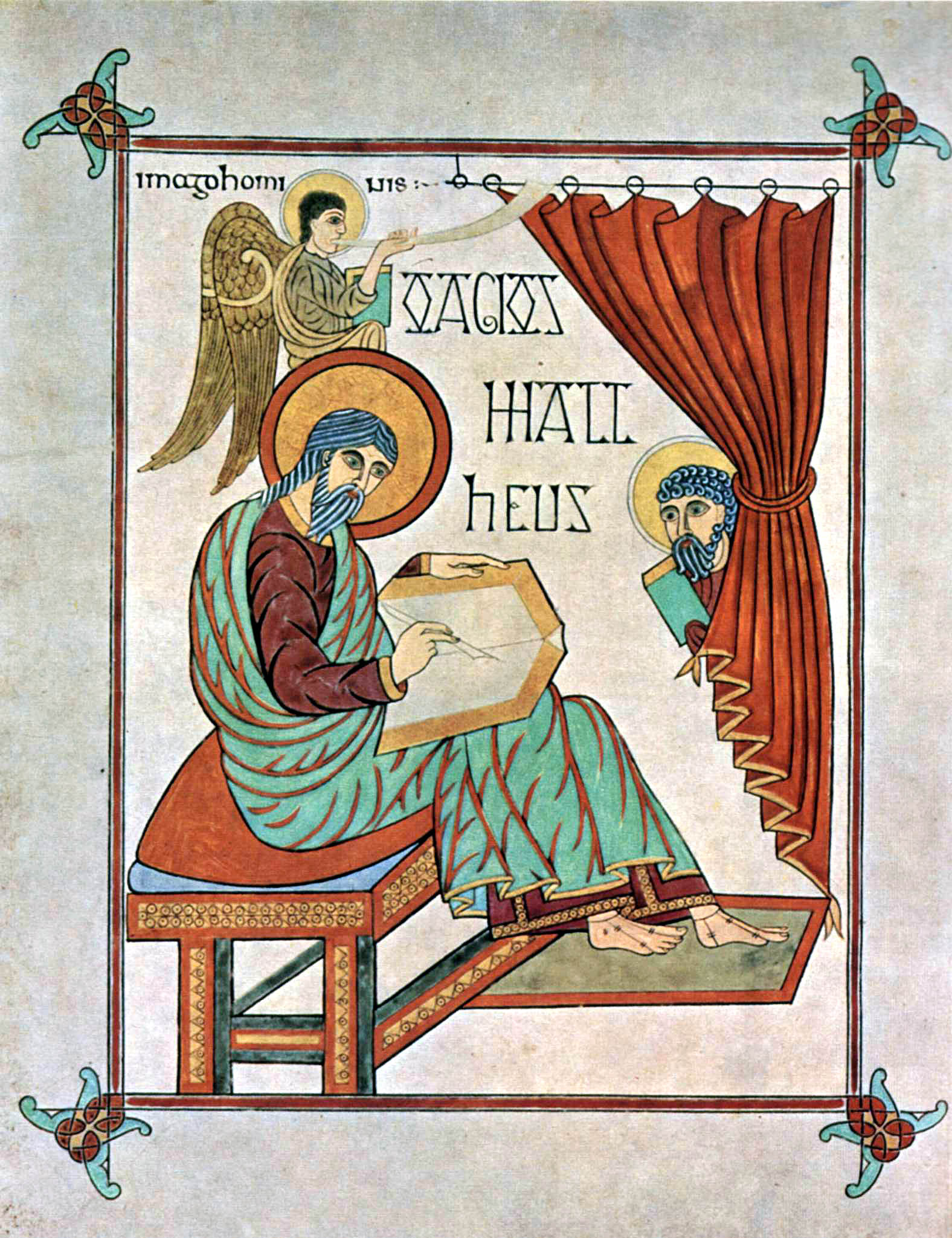
An illustration from the Lindisfarne Gospels

Conquests by Anglian invaders led to the establishment of the kingdoms of Deira and Bernicia. The first Anglian settlement was effected in 547 by Ida, who, accompanied by his six sons, pushed through the narrow strip of territory between the Cheviots and the sea, and set up a fortress at Bamburgh, which became the royal seat of the Bernician kings. About the end of the 6th century Bernicia was first united with the rival kingdom of Deira under the rule of Æthelfrith of Northumbria, and the district between the Humber and the Forth became known as the kingdom of Northumbria.

After Æthelfrith was killed in battle around 616, Edwin of Deira became king of Northumbria. Æthelfrith's son Oswald fled northwest to the Gaelic kingdom of Dál Riata where he was converted to Christianity by the monks of Iona. Meanwhile, Paulinus, the first bishop of York, converted King Edwin to Roman Christianity and began an extensive program of conversion and baptism. By his time the kingdom must have reached the west coast, as Edwin is said to have conquered the islands of Anglesey and Man. Under Edwin the Northumbrian kingdom became the chief power in Britain. However, when Cadwallon ap Cadfan defeated Edwin at Hatfield Chase in 633, Northumbria was divided into the former kingdoms of Bernicia and Deira and Christianity suffered a temporary decline.

In 634, Oswald defeated Cadwallon ap Cadfan at the Battle of Heavenfield, resulting in the re-unification of Northumbria. Oswald re-established Christianity in the kingdom and assigned a bishopric at Hexham, where Wilfrid erected a famous early English church. Reunification was followed by a period of Northumbrian expansion into Pictish territory and growing dominance over the Celtic kingdoms of Dál Riata and Strathclyde to the west. Northumbrian encroachments were abruptly curtailed in 685, when Ecgfrith suffered complete defeat by a Pictish force at the Battle of Nechtansmere.

=== Monastic culture ===
When Saint Aidan came at the request of Oswald to preach to the Northumbrians he chose the island of Lindisfarne as the site of his church and monastery, and made it the head of the diocese which he founded in 635. For some years the see continued in peace, numbering among its bishops Saint Cuthbert, but in 793 Vikings landed on the island and burnt the settlement, killing many of the monks. The survivors, however, rebuilt the church and continued to live there until 883, when, through fear of a second invasion of the Danes, they fled inland, taking with them the body of Cuthbert and other holy relics.

Against this background, the monasteries of Northumbria developed some remarkably influential cultural products. Cædmon, a monk at Whitby Abbey, authored one of the earliest surviving examples of Old English poetry some time before 680. The Lindisfarne Gospels, an early example of insular art, is attributed to Eadfrith, the bishop of Lindisfarne from 698 to 721. Stenton (1971, p. 191) describes the book as follows.

In mere script it is no more than an admirable example of a noble style, and the figure drawing of its illustrations, though probably based on classical models, has more than a touch of naïveté. Its unique importance is due to the beauty and astonishing intricacy of its decoration. The nature of its ornament connects it very closely with a group of Irish manuscripts of which the Book of Kells is the most famous.

Bede's writing, at the Northumbrian monasteries at Wearmouth and Jarrow, gained him a reputation as the most learned scholar of his age. His work is notable for both its breadth (encompassing history, theology, science and literature) and quality, exemplified by the rigorous use of citation. Bede's most famous work is Ecclesiastical History of the English People, which is regarded as a highly influential early model of historical scholarship.

== Earldom of Northumbria ==
The kingdom of Northumbria ceased to exist in 927, when it was incorporated into England as an earldom by Athelstan, the first king of a united England.. In 937, Athelstan's victory over a combined Norse-Celtic force in the battle of Brunanburh secured England's control of its northern territory.

The Scottish king Indulf captured Edinburgh in 954, which thenceforth remained in possession of the Scots. His successors made repeated attempts to extend their territory southwards. Malcolm II was finally successful, when, in 1018, he annihilated the Northumbrian army at Carham on the Tweed, and Eadulf the earl of Northumbria ceded all his territory to the north of that river as the price of peace. Henceforth Lothian, consisting of the former region of Northumbria between the Forth and the Tweed, remained in possession of the Scottish kings.

The term Northumberland was first recorded in its contracted modern sense in 1065 in an entry in the Anglo-Saxon Chronicle relating to a rebellion against Tostig Godwinson.

== Norman Conquest ==
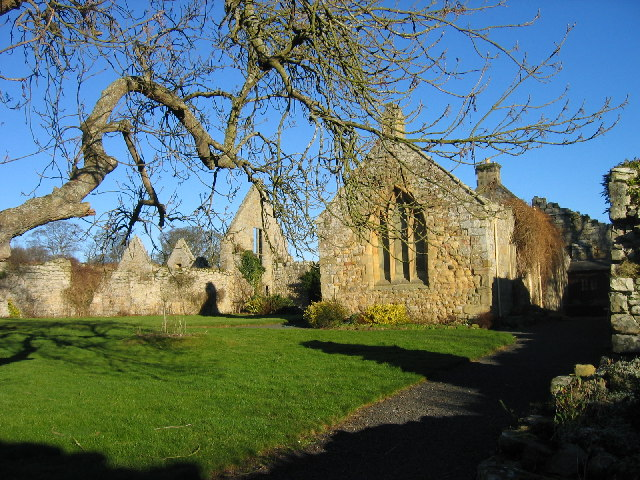
Hulne Priory, west of Alnwick.

The vigorous resistance of Northumbria to William the Conqueror was punished by ruthless harrying, mostly south of the River Tees. As recounted by the Anglo-Saxon Chronicle:

A.D. 1068. This year King William gave Earl Robert the earldom over Northumberland; but the landsmen attacked him in the town of Durham, and slew him, and nine hundred men with him. Soon afterwards Edgar Etheling came with all the Northumbrians to York; and the townsmen made a treaty with him: but King William came from the South unawares on them with a large army, and put them to flight, and slew on the spot those who could not escape; which were many hundred men; and plundered the town. St. Peter's minster he made a profanation, and all other places also he despoiled and trampled upon; and the ethelling went back again to Scotland.

The Normans rebuilt the Anglian monasteries of Lindisfarne, Hexham and Tynemouth, and founded Norman abbeys at Newminster (1139), Alnwick (1147), Brinkburn (1180), Hulne, and Blanchland. Castles were built at Newcastle (1080), Alnwick (1096), Bamburgh (1131), Harbottle (1157), Prudhoe (1172), Warkworth (1205), Chillingham, Ford (1287), Dunstanburgh (1313), Morpeth, Langley (1350), Wark on Tweed and Norham (1121), the latter an enclave of the palatine bishops of Durham.

Northumberland county is not mentioned in the Domesday Book of 1086, but the account of the issues of the county, as rendered by Odard the sheriff, is entered in the Great Roll of the Exchequer for 1131.

In 1237, Scotland renounced claims to Northumberland county in the Treaty of York.

During the reign of Edward I (1272–1307), the county of Northumberland was the district between the Tees and the Tweed, and had within it several scattered liberties subject to other powers: Durham, Sadberge, Bedlingtonshire, and Norhamshire belonging to the bishop of Durham; Hexhamshire to the archbishop of York; Tynedale to the king of Scotland; Emildon to the earl of Lancaster; and Redesdale to Gilbert de Umfraville, Earl of Angus. These franchises were exempt from the ordinary jurisdiction of the shire. Over time, some were incorporated within the county: Tynedale in 1495; Hexhamshire in 1572; and Norhamshire, Islandshire and Bedlingtonshire by the Counties (Detached Parts) Act 1844.

- Council of the North

The county court for Northumberland was held at different times at Newcastle, Alnwick and Morpeth, until by statute of 1549 it was ordered that the court should thenceforth be held in the town and castle of Alnwick. Under the same statute the sheriffs of Northumberland, who had been in the habit of appropriating the issues of the county to their private use, were required thereafter to deliver in their accounts to the Exchequer in the same manner as the sheriffs of other counties.

== Border wars, reivers and rebels ==
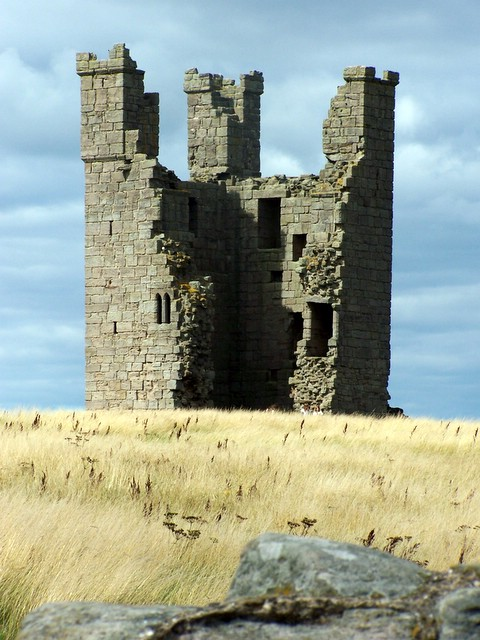
Dunstanburgh Castle (built c. 1320) was garrisoned by the Lancastrians in 1462.

From the Norman Conquest until the union of England and Scotland under James I and VI, Northumberland was the scene of perpetual inroads and devastations by the Scots. Norham, Alnwick and Wark were captured by David I of Scotland in the wars of Stephen's reign. In 1174, during his invasion of Northumbria, William I of Scotland, also known as William the Lion, was captured by a party of about four hundred mounted knights, led by Ranulf de Glanvill. This incident became known as the Battle of Alnwick. In 1295, Robert de Ros and the earls of Athol and Menteith ravaged Redesdale, Coquetdale and Tynedale. In 1314 the county was ravaged by king Robert Bruce. And so dire was the Scottish threat in 1382, that by special enactment the earl of Northumberland was ordered to remain on his estates to protect the border. In 1388, Henry Percy was taken prisoner and 1500 of his men slain at the battle of Otterburn, immortalised in the ballad of Chevy Chase.

Alnwick, Bamburgh and Dunstanburgh were garrisoned for the Lancastrian cause in 1462, but after the Yorkist victories of Hexham and Hedgley Moor in 1464, Alnwick and Dunstanburgh surrendered, and Bamburgh was taken by storm.

In September 1513, King James IV of Scotland was killed at the Battle of Flodden on Branxton Moor.

Roman Catholic support in Northumberland for Mary, Queen of Scots, led to the Rising of the North in 1569.

- Harbottle
- Border Reivers
- Peel tower

== Union and Civil War ==
After uniting the English and Scottish thrones, James VI and I sharply curbed the lawlessness of the border reivers and brought relative peace to the region. There were Church of Scotland congregations in Northumberland in the 17th and 18th centuries.

During the Civil War of the 17th century, Newcastle was garrisoned for the king by the earl of Newcastle, but in 1644 it was captured by the Scots under the earl of Leven, and in 1646 Charles I was led there a captive under the charge of David Leslie.

Many of the chief Northumberland families were ruined in the Jacobite rebellion of 1715.

== Industrialisation ==
The mineral resources of the area appear to have been exploited to some extent from remote times. It is certain that coal was used by the Romans in Northumberland, and some coal ornaments found at Angerton have been attributed to the 7th century. In a 13th-century grant to Newminster Abbey a road for the conveyance of sea coal from the shore about Blyth is mentioned, and the Blyth coal field was worked throughout the 14th and 15th centuries. The coal trade on the Tyne did not exist to any extent before the 13th century, but from that period it developed rapidly, and Newcastle acquired the monopoly of the river shipping and coal trade. Lead was exported from Newcastle in the 12th century, probably from Hexhamshire, the lead mines of which were very prosperous throughout the 16th and 17th centuries. In a charter from Richard I to Hugh de Puiset creating him earl of Northumberland, mines of silver and iron are mentioned. A salt pan is mentioned at Warkworth in the 12th century; in the 13th century the salt industry flourished at the mouth of the river Blyth, and in the 15th century formed the principal occupation of the inhabitants of North and South Shields. In the reign of Elizabeth I, glass factories were set up at Newcastle by foreign refugees, and the industry spread rapidly along the Tyne. Tanning, both of leather and of nets, was largely practised in the 13th century, and the salmon fisheries in the Tyne were famous in the reign of Henry I.

- John Smeaton designed the Coldstream Bridge and a bridge at Hexham.
- Stephenson's Rocket
- Invention of the steam turbine by Charles Algernon Parsons

== See also ==
- Northumbria
- Northumbria's golden age
- Earl of Northumberland
- History of England
- Kingdom of England
- Timeline of Northumbria and Northumberland
- Timeline of Newcastle upon Tyne
