= Airdeconut =

Norse king of Northumbria c. 900

Airdeconut (Old Norse: Harðaknútr) (Note: The Old Norse spelling is that used by Downham.) was a Norse King of Northumbria. Numismatic evidence suggests he was a Christian and he probably ruled in Northern England around the year 900.

== Discovery ==
In 2011 a hoard of coins and jewellery was discovered near Silverdale, Lancashire, England. One of the coins discovered in this hoard carries the name AIRDECONUT on one side, and the letters DNS (an abbreviation of DOMINUS) REX on the other. DOMINUS REX translates as "the Lord and King". Officials at the British Museum have said the inscription Airdeconut might be a rendering of the Norse name Harthacnut. Experts from the museum have identified that the coin's design relates to coins of the kings Siefredus and Cnut (Sigfroðr and Knútr in Old Norse), who ruled the Viking kingdom of Northumbria jointly between 895 and 905. The coin is also significant since it suggests Airdeconut was a Christian – the reverse inscription DNS (DOMINUS) REX is arranged in a cross.

This coin is the only piece of evidence for the existence of a ruler of Northumbria by the name of Harthacnut. According to Dr Gareth Williams, curator of early medieval coins at the British Museum, the discovery of the existence of Airdeconut represents the first new Medieval king in England discovered for over fifty years and the first previously-unknown Norse king discovered since 1840.

== Historical background ==
It is likely that Airdeconut was one of several kings who shared power in Viking Northumbria at the start of the tenth century. The period was one of political instability – the ruling Vikings of Dublin were expelled in 902 and some of them came to England. Several of these later reigned over Northumbria as kings in York. There was much conflict between the Anglo-Saxons of Mercia and Wessex and the Vikings of Northumbria in this period. It culminated in the Battle of Tettenhall in 910 when a combined Wessexian-Mercian army dealt a decisive defeat to a Viking army raiding in Mercia, killing several northern kings including Eowils and Halfdan.

== See also ==
- Harthacnut I of Denmark
