= 910 =

Calendar year

910 in various calendars
- Gregorian calendar: 910; CMX
- Ab urbe condita: 1663
- Armenian calendar: 359; ԹՎ ՅԾԹ
- Assyrian calendar: 5660
- Balinese saka calendar: 831–832
- Bengali calendar: 316–317
- Berber calendar: 1860
- Buddhist calendar: 1454
- Burmese calendar: 272
- Byzantine calendar: 6418–6419
- Chinese calendar: 己巳年 (Earth Snake); 3607 or 3400 — to — 庚午年 (Metal Horse); 3608 or 3401
- Coptic calendar: 626–627
- Discordian calendar: 2076
- Ethiopian calendar: 902–903
- Hebrew calendar: 4670–4671
- Hindu calendars
- Vikram Samvat: 966–967
- Shaka Samvat: 831–832
- Kali Yuga: 4010–4011
- Holocene calendar: 10910
- Iranian calendar: 288–289
- Islamic calendar: 297–298
- Japanese calendar: Engi 10 (延喜１０年)
- Javanese calendar: 809–810
- Julian calendar: 910; CMX
- Korean calendar: 3243
- Minguo calendar: 1002 before ROC 民前1002年
- Nanakshahi calendar: −558
- Seleucid era: 1221/1222 AG
- Thai solar calendar: 1452–1453
- Tibetan calendar: ས་མོ་སྦྲུལ་ལོ་ (female Earth-Snake); 1036 or 655 or −117 — to — ལྕགས་ཕོ་རྟ་ལོ་ (male Iron-Horse); 1037 or 656 or −116

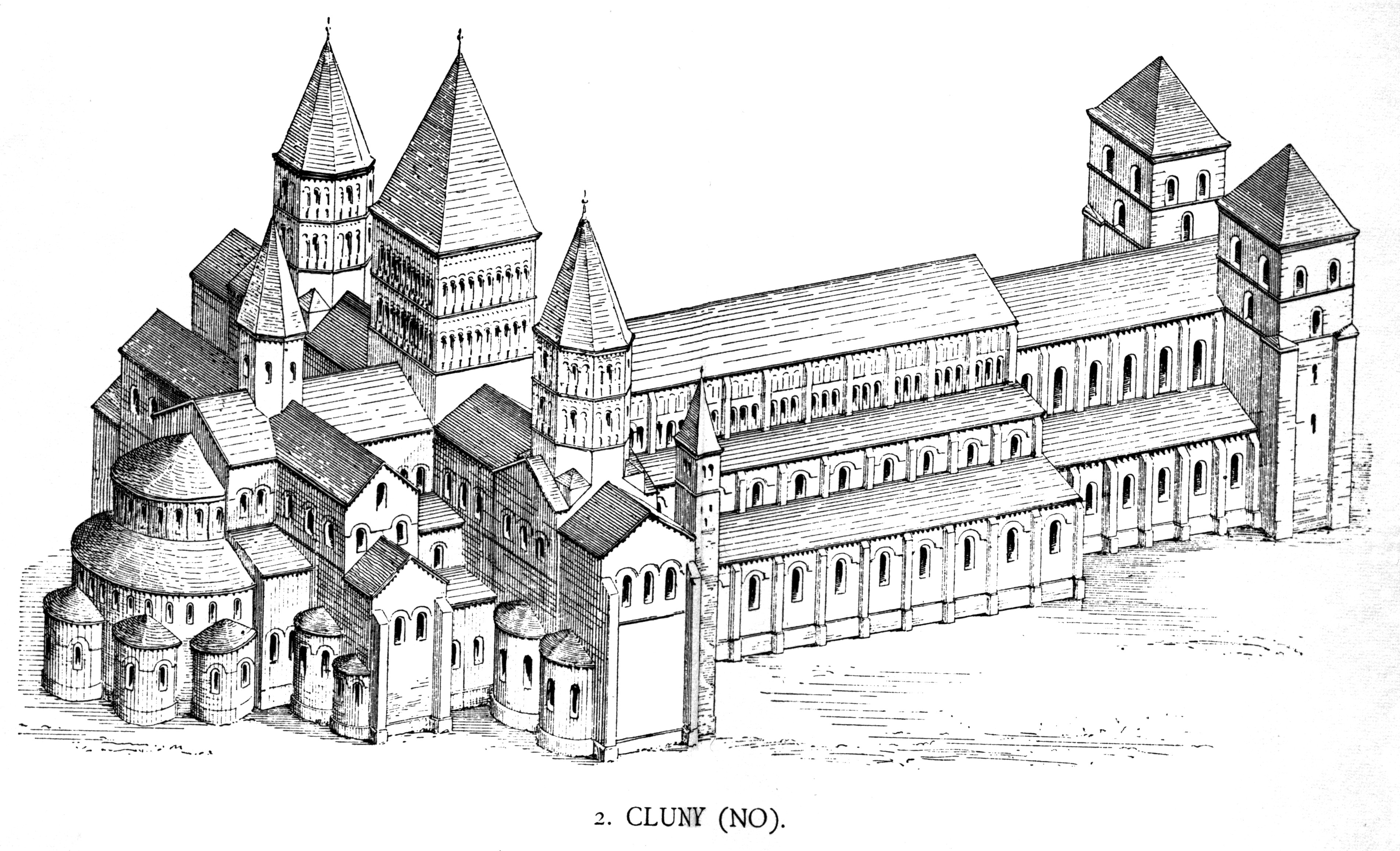
The Abbey of Cluny, reconstruction.

Year 910 (CMX) was a common year starting on Monday of the Julian calendar.

== Events ==
=== By place ===
==== Europe ====
- June 12 – Battle of Augsburg: The Hungarians defeat the East Frankish army under King Louis IV (the Child), using the famous feigned retreat tactic of the nomadic warriors. Count Gausbert, the actual commander of the East Frankish army (because Louis IV is only 16 years old at this time), is killed in the battle.
- June 22 – Battle of Rednitz: The Hungarians defeat the East Frankish army near the Rednitz River, killing its leader Gebhard, Duke of Lotharingia (Lorraine). After the battle Louis IV, together with the East Frankish duchies Franconia, Lotharingia, Bavaria and Saxony, agrees to pay tribute to the Hungarian state.
- Summer – King Alfonso III of Asturias is forced to abdicate the throne and partitions the kingdom among his three sons. The eldest son, García I, becomes king of León. The second son, Ordoño II, reigns in Galicia, while the third, Fruela II, receives Asturias with Oviedo as his capital.

==== Britain ====
- August 5 – Battle of Tettenhall: King Edward the Elder attacks the joint-Kings Eowils and Halfdan of Norse York. All three Viking monarchs are killed in battle (one chronicle mentions a third brother) and the Viking army is decisively defeated by allied forces of Mercia and Wessex. The co-Kings are succeeded by Ragnall ua Ímair.

=== By topic ===
==== Religion ====
- William I (the Pious) of Aquitaine, donates land in Burgundy for the building of a Benedictine monastery dedicated to the saints Peter and Paul. Hence the Abbey of Cluny, becomes the largest in the West. In the foundation charter, William renounces all rights to the monastery and nominates Berno as the first abbot of Cluny (Eastern France). He places the monastery directly under the control of the Papal See.
- Gabriel I becomes Pope of the Coptic Orthodox Church in Alexandria (Egypt).

== Births ==
- Adalbert, archbishop of Magdeburg (approximate date)
- Eadgyth, Anglo-Saxon princess and queen of Germany (d. 946)
- Fernán González, count of Castile (approximate date)
- Fujiwara no Asatada, Japanese nobleman (d. 966)
- Gamle Eirikssen, Norwegian Viking ruler (d. 955)
- Gunnhild, Norwegian Viking queen (approximate date)
- Hedwig of Saxony, Frankish noblewoman and regent (d. 965)
- Helena Lekapene, Byzantine empress (approximate date)
- Herbert III, Frankish nobleman (approximate date)
- John XI, pope of the Catholic Church (d. 935)
- Ma Yize, Muslim astronomer (approximate date)
- Minamoto no Saneakira, Japanese nobleman (d. 970)
- Nilus the Younger, Byzantine abbot (d. 1005)
- Oda of Metz, German noblewoman (d. 963)
- Sahl ben Matzliah, Jewish philosopher (d. 990)
- Yan Xu, Chinese chancellor (d. 967)

== Deaths ==
- January 26 – Luo Yin, Chinese statesman and poet
- June 2 – Richilde of Provence, Frankish empress
- June 22
  - Gebhard, Frankish nobleman
  - Gerhard I, Frankish nobleman
- July 4 – Luo Shaowei, Chinese warlord (b. 877)
- July 31 – Feng Xingxi, Chinese warlord
- August 5
  - Eowils and Halfdan, kings of Northumbria
  - Ingwær, king of Northumbria
- December 20 – Alfonso III, king of Asturias
- December 23 – Naum of Preslav, Bulgarian writer
- Adelin, bishop of Séez (approximate date)
- Andronikos Doukas, Byzantine general (approximate date)
- Atenulf I (the Great), Lombard prince
- Eustathios Argyros, Byzantine general
- Isa al-Nushari, Abbasid governor
- Ishaq ibn Hunayn, Abbasid physician (or 911)
- Junayd Baghdadi, Persian Sufi mystic (b. 835)
- Liu Shouwen, Chinese warlord and governor
- Lu Guangchou, Chinese warlord
- Mahendrapala I, king of Gurjara-Pratihara (India)
- Muhammad ibn Tahir, Abbasid governor
- Muncimir, duke (knyaz) of Croatia
- Sosei, Japanese waka poet (b. 844)
- Wei Zhuang, Chinese poet (b. 836)
- Yasovarman I, ruler of the Angkor Empire
