= Scandinavian York =

Historical Norse colony in present-day England

- Kingdom of Jórvík: 867–954; Earldom: 954–1066
- Status: The kingdom of York, forming the southern part of Northumbria, and to the south of it the rest of the Danelaw
- Capital: York
- Common languages: Old Norse • Old English
- Religion: Norse paganism (mostly Norsemen); Chalcedonian Christianity (mostly Anglo-Saxons)
- Government: Monarchy; Earldom (after 954)
- King Earl (after 954)
- History
  - Formed: 867
  - Norman Conquest: 1066
- Currency: Sceat (peninga)
Preceded by	Succeeded by
Northumbria	Norman England
- Today part of: United Kingdom

Scandinavian York (Jórvík) or Viking (Note: In this article "Viking" is used in the modern sense, so the term is defined as "The inhabitants of Scandinavia, between the 7th and 11th centuries, before and after they achieved separate or more distinct identities...[also those] who left their homelands for a more exciting or better life." Discussions about the Anglo-Scandinavian archaeology in York has called them both "Danes" and "Norwegian" so "Viking" is a useful inclusive shorthand.) York (Old Norse: Jórvík) is a term used by historians for a region similar to current Yorkshire (Note: The Historic County of what is now Yorkshire (referred to as Eurvivscrire in the Domesday Book) before 1086 also contained Amounderness, Cartmel, Furness, Kendal, parts of Copeland, Lonsdale and Cravenshire (modern Lancashire north of the Ribble and parts of Cumberland and Westmorland).) during the period of Scandinavian domination after the Viking invasion in 865 (interspersed with brief periods of Anglo-Saxon control) until it was annexed and integrated into England after the Norman Conquest in 1066; in particular, it is used to refer to York, the city controlled by this ebb and flow of Viking and Anglo-Saxon kings and earls, including the period when Viking King Cnut ruled all of England, part of his North Sea Empire, until his death in 1035. The Kingdom of Jórvík was closely associated with the longer-lived Kingdom of Dublin (Note: J.A. Cannon suggests that Ivar and his half-brother Halfdan, who seized York in 867, were raiders from the Viking kingdom of Dublin.) throughout this period.

== History ==
=== Pre-Viking age ===
A map of the routes taken by the Great Heathen Army from 865 to 878

York was first recorded by Ptolemy around the year 150 as Eborakon. During Roman Britain, it became the provincial capital and bishopric of Eburacum. The Roman settlement was regularly planned, well-defended, and contained a stone castra (legionary fortress).

The end of Roman rule in Britain happened in 407, and was followed by the Anglo-Saxon settlement of Britain starting in 410. The Angles occupied the settlement beginning in the early 7th century. Post-Roman York was in the kingdom of Deira; it was taken over in 655 by its northern neighbour, Bernicia, to form the kingdom of Northumbria. Edwin, King of Northumbria, was baptized there in 627, and the first Anglo-Saxon archbishop, Ecgbert, was consecrated in 780. The settlement became the trading port of Eoforwic.

=== Viking invasion ===
The Vikings had been raiding the coasts of England from the late 8th century, but in 865 a Viking army landed with the intention of conquering rather than just raiding. The Anglo-Saxon Chronicle described the army as the "mycel heathen here" (Great Heathen Army). They landed in East Anglia where the locals, under Edmund of East Anglia, "made peace" (Note: Asser actually uses the term "make peace". historians have suggested that this means paying the Vikings money or goods in return for peace. See Asser ch. 10 where he explicitly says that the men from Kent paid money in return for peace.) with them in return for horses.

The army, led by Ivar the Boneless and his brother Halfdan Ragnarsson, made its way north to Northumbria where the Anglo-Saxons were embroiled in a civil war. In 862 the ruler of Northumbria, Osberht, had been deposed by Ælla of Northumbria. Ivar the Boneless was able to capitalize on the Anglo-Saxons disarray and captured York in 866/ 867.

=== Scandinavian rule 866–901 ===
After Ivar the Boneless had annexed York, the two Anglo-Saxon leaders settled their differences; they joined forces and attempted to retake the city. When the Northumbrians attacked, the Vikings withdrew behind the crumbling Roman city walls, but the Anglo-Saxon leaders were both killed and the Northumbrians defeated during the ensuing battle on 21 March 867. Symeon of Durham wrote:

In those days, the nation of the Northumbrians had violently expelled from the kingdom the rightful king of their nation, Osbryht by name, and had placed at the head of the kingdom a certain tyrant, named Alla. When the pagans came upon the kingdom, the dissension was allayed by divine counsel and the aid of the nobles. King Osbryht and Alla, having united their forces and formed an army, came to the city of York; on their approach the multitude of the shipmen immediately took flight. The Christians, perceiving their flight and terror, found that they themselves were the stronger party. They fought upon each side with much ferocity, and both kings fell. The rest who escaped made peace with the Danes.

— The Historical Works of Simeon of Durham, Symeon of Durham 1855, p. 470

The remaining Northumbrian leaders, probably led by Archbishop Wulfhere, "made peace" with the Vikings. The Vikings appointed a compliant native prince, Ecgberht, as puppet ruler of Northumbria. Five years later, in 872, when the Great Army was elsewhere, the local Northumbrians capitalized on their absence by driving Wulfhere and Ecgberht out. The two exiles found refuge at the court of Burgred of Mercia. The revolt was short-lived, with the Vikings regaining control of York in 873. Wulfhere was recalled to the See but the Anglo-Saxon Ricsige became ruler, as Ecgberht died in 873.

In 875/ 876 part of the Great Army returned, headed by Halfdan Ragnarsson. York was retaken and although Halfdan was proclaimed King of Northumbria, in reality he was only the ruler of southern Northumbria (Deira). Deira became known as the Kingdom of York (Old Norse: Jórvík) with Halfdan as its first king. According to the Anglo-Saxon Chronicle:

Halfdene apportioned the lands of North-humbria: and they thenceforth continued ploughing and tilling them.

— Giles 1914, A. 876

Halfdan's reign did not last long, as he was killed while trying to assert his claim to the Kingdom of Dublin, in 877.

There was an interregnum after Halfdan died until Guthred became king in 883. Guthred was the first Christian Viking king of York. It is traditionally thought that Guthred's election was sponsored by Archbishop Wulfhere's religious community from Lindisfarne. Churches and religious centres in Northumbria had been systematically stripped of their wealth since the arrival of the Vikings; however, although it had become impoverished, the number of ecclesiastical artifacts that have been excavated in York, from various periods between the 7th and 11th centuries, indicates that the cathedral remained a religious centre throughout. Guthred died in 895 (Note: Some sources suggest that he died in 894 or 896.) and was buried at York Minster.

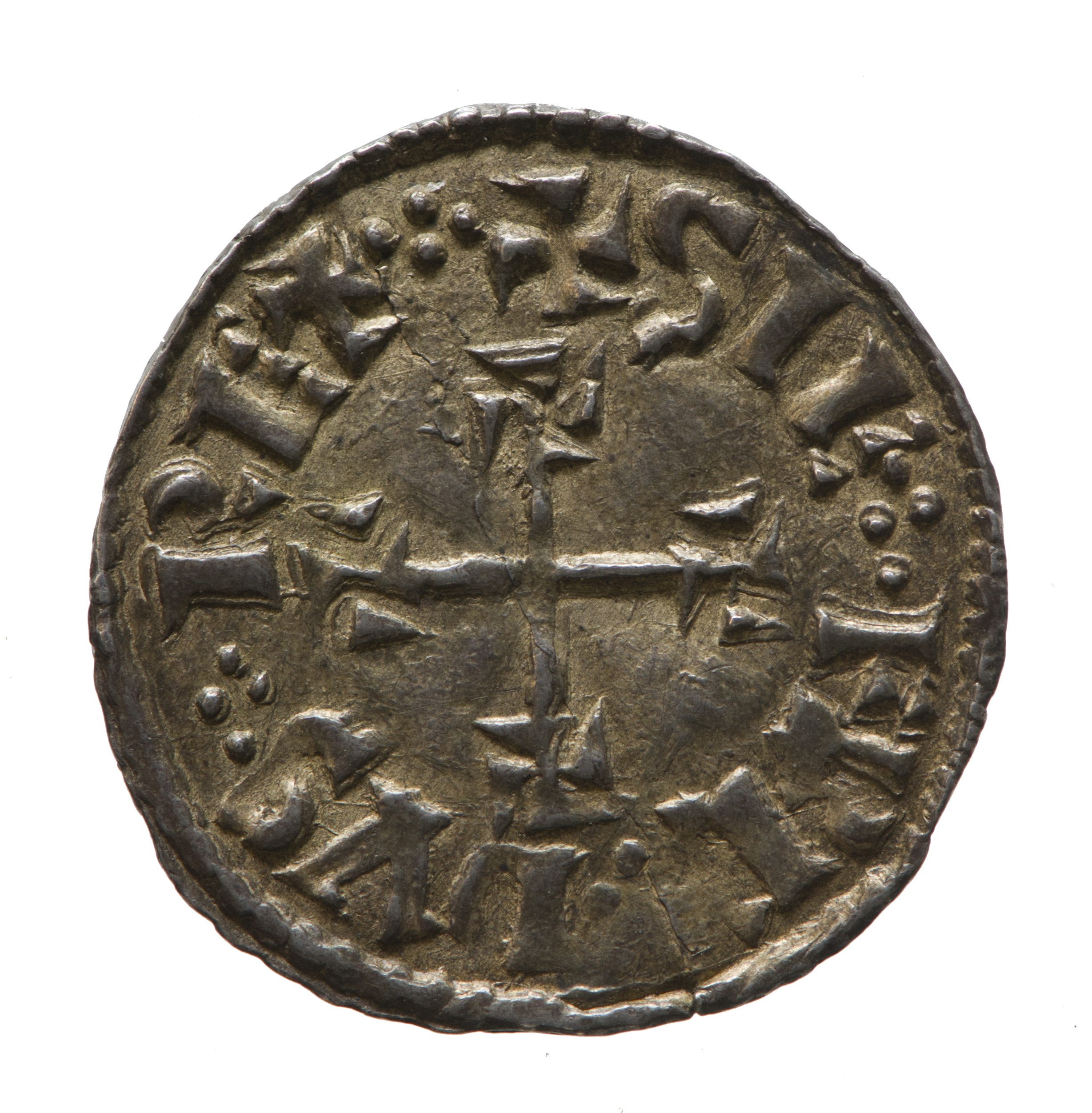
Silver penny of Siedfredus

Siefredus of Northumbria replaced Guthred as ruler of Jórvík. Although not much is known about him, some information has been provided by coin evidence. A substantial find in the Ribble Valley, during the 19th century, now known as the Cuerdale Hoard, contained approximately 8,000 Anglo-Scandinavian coins as well as continental and Kufic coins, which include those from the Islamic world such as dirhams as well as imitations with pseudo-Kufic markings. Some of the coins discovered have Siefredus's name on them, providing an indication of when he reigned. The coin evidence suggests that Siefredus succeeded Guthred and ruled from about 895 until 900.

The writing of the medieval chronicler Æthelweard has led some historians to suggest that Siefriedus may be the same person as Sichfrith Jarl, who had previously been raiding the coast of Wessex.

"When these events so happened, Sigferth the pirate arrived from the land of the Northumbrians with a large fleet, ravaged twice and afterwards sailed back to his own homeland."

— Æthelweard 1962, p. 50 A. 895

The historian Alfred P. Smyth suggests this is the same Sichfrith who laid claim to the Kingdom of Dublin that same year.

The Cuerdale Hoard also contained some coins with the name Cnut (Knútr) on them; the coin evidence suggests that he reigned between 900 and 905. He is listed as ruler of York but has proved to be something of a conundrum, for historians, as Cnut is not recorded on any written contemporary sources. Historians have posited several hypotheses. As some of the coins had both Siefredus' and Cnut's names on them, they might be the same person. Another possibility is that he was "a Danish noble, mentioned in Norse sources, who was assassinated in 902 after a very brief reign. So brief that there was not enough time to produce coins in quantity."

=== A West Saxon rules Northumbria ===
The next ruler, Æthelwold, was the son of Æthelred, the king of Wessex from 865 to 871. Following his father's death, in 871, his uncle Alfred the Great became king. When Alfred died in 899, Alfred's son Edward the Elder ascended the throne of Wessex. However, Æthelwold made a bid for power, seizing his father's old estate in Wimbourne. Edward's forces besieged Æthelwold's position, forcing him to flee. He went to York, where the locals accepted him as king, in 901. According to the Anglo-Saxon Chronicle:

... he stole away by night, and sought the army in North-humbria; and they received him for their king, and became obedient to him.

— Giles 1914, A. 901

Æthelwold did not stay in York long; in 903 he began a campaign to regain the crown of Wessex. The Anglo-Saxon Chronicle describes how he raised a fleet and landed first in Essex, then went on to East Anglia where he persuaded their king Eohric to help him in his campaign. The combined armies raided Wessex in the Cricklade area. Edward and his allies responded by attacking East Anglia. Edward's Kentish allies engaged Æthelwold's army, and in this battle (Note: The Anglo-Saxon Chronicle dates this to 905, while Cannon and Hargreaves tentatively identify this battle as the Battle of the Holme in 903 (s.v. "AEthelwald" and "Oeric").) Æthelwold was killed.

=== Scandinavian rule restored 903–926 ===
Edward followed up his attack on East Anglia with raids into the Viking kingdom. The following year the Vikings retaliated, led by their new joint kings Eowils and Halfdan II (Note: Æthelweard Chronicle says that there was a third joint king known as Ingwær, this is not supported by the other sources.) their intention was to raid Mercia and Wessex but were intercepted and killed when they met a joint army from Wessex and Mercia at Tettenhall on 5 August 910.

Ragnall I was York's next ruler, he was the grandson of Ímar (Note: Ímar is probably synonymous with Ivar the Boneless) and was probably one of the Vikings expelled from Dublin in 902. He fought against Constantín II, King of Scotland, in the Battle of Corbridge in 918. It is not clear from the annals, (Note: For example Historia de Sancto Cuthberto suggests the Vikings won the battle whereas the Chronicle of the Kings of Alba suggest they lost.) who actually won the battle, but the outcome did allow Ragnall to establish himself as king at York. It seems that the people of York were unhappy with Ragnall as they promised obedience to Æthelflæd, Lady of the Mercians in early 918, but the negotiations were ended prematurely by her death in June of that year. Later in his reign, Ragnall submitted to Edward as overlord, but was allowed to keep his kingdom. Ragnall had three separate issues of coins produced while he ruled York the coins bearing the name RAIENALT, RACNOLDT or similar. He died late in 920 or early 921.

The next ruler was Sihtric, who was a kinsman of Ragnall, and another Viking leader that had been expelled from the Kingdom of Dublin, in 902. Sihtric, however had returned to Ireland to retake Dublin and become their king. Then in 920 he travelled to York and joined Ragnall where in 921 Ragnall died and Sihtric replaced him as king.

Sihtric raided Davenport, Cheshire, in violation of the terms of submission agreed between Ragnall and Edward. (Note: Smyth has suggested that this was an act of defiance by Sihtric, indicating to Edward that he would not submit to him like Ragnall) Edward the Elder died in 924. It seems that Sihtric took advantage of the situation to expand his kingdom. There is some numismatic evidence to support this as there are coins, from this time, minted at Lincoln, in the Kingdom of Mercia, as well those from York.

Edward was replaced by his son Æthelstan, and although the annals indicated that Sihtric was reluctant to submit to Edward, he submitted to Æthelstan at Tamworth in January 926. Part of the agreement was that Sihtric should marry Æthelstan's sister Eadgyth, and that he should be baptised. According to Roger of Wendover, Sihtric was baptised but he "repudiated" the faith and rejected his bride shortly after, without the marriage being consummated.

=== West Saxon rule 927–939 ===
In 927 Sihtric died. His brother Gofraid left Dublin and headed to Northumbria to replace Sihtric as king but his attempt to rule was unsuccessful, and he was driven out by King Æthelstan. The Anglo-Saxon Chronicle makes no mention of Gofraid, simply stating that Æthelstan succeeded Sihtric as King in Northumbria, and thereafter held a meeting with the other kings in Britain, establishing peace. A later account by William of Malmesbury tells a different story. In his version, Gofraid goes to Scotland following Sihtric's death, to attend a meeting at Dacre with Æthelstan, Constantine II of Scotland, and Owen I of Strathclyde. Gofraid and a Viking ally called Thurfrith led a force to York and besieged the city. Æthelstan counterattacked and Gofraid was captured. The city was then looted by the Anglo-Saxons and Gofraid allowed to return to Ireland.

[Guthferth] ... at last came a suppliant to court. Being amicably received by the king, and sumptuously entertained for four days, he resought his ships; an incorrigible pirate, and accustomed to live in the water like a fish.

— William of Malmesbury 1847, p. 133

In 937 a coalition of Vikings (led by Gofraid's son Olaf Guthfrithson), Constantine II, King of Scotland, and Owain, King of Strathclyde invaded England. The invaders were stopped and defeated by Æthelstan, and his allies, (Note: The Mercians were integrated into the English army at this time.) at the Battle of Brunanburh. After this, although Æthelstan's relationship with Northumbria was not an easy one, his hold on it remained secure until his death in 939.

During his reign, Æthelstan integrated Northumbria into England and the design of the coinage was changed to conform with the standard English system. On some coins, produced at York, the mint-signature was Eforwic, the Old English name for York.

=== Restoration of Scandinavian rule 939–944 ===
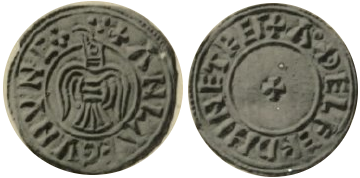
A penny from York minted in Olaf Sihtricsson's time, the moneyer was Æthelfrith. The obverse shows a bird, presumed to be a Raven, the reverse a cross.

Although Æthelstan had integrated the Anglo-Saxon kingdoms into one unified England and suppressed opposition from the Vikings and their allies, when he died in 939, the Viking leader Olaf Guthfrithson (who had been defeated at Brunanburh) arrived from Dublin and took over Northumbria with minimal opposition. Coins minted at York during his reign show the Raven motif.

In 940, his cousin Olaf Cuaran joined him in York. In 941 Olaf Guthfrithson invaded Mercia and East Anglia The Archbishops of York and Canterbury mediated and Edmund I, Æthelstan's successor, surrendered much of the south-east Midlands and Lincolnshire.

It is probable that Olaf Guthfrithson died in 942 and was replaced by Olaf Cuaran. Then in 943 the Anglo-Saxon Chronicle says that Olaf Cuaran was baptised, with Edmund as sponsor, and that same year, another king of Northumbria, was named as Ragnall Guthfrithson and he was confirmed also with Edmund as sponsor. Both Olaf and Ragnall are called king, but it is uncertain whether they were co-rulers or rival kings.

The chronology of events for both Olaf Guthfrithson, Olaf Cuaranths and Ragnalls' reigns have been subject to debate however the annals for 944 all seem to agree that Edmund was able to expel the Viking leaders from Northumbria.

=== English rule 944–947 ===
In 945, Edmund invaded Cumbria and blinded two sons of Domnall mac Eógain, king of Strathclyde. Then according to the Anglo-Saxon Chronicle he "granted" all of Strathclyde, to Malcom king of the Scots in return for an alliance.

This year king Edmund ravaged all Cumberland, and granted it all to Malcolm king of the Scots, on the condition, that he should be his fellow-worker as well by sea as by land.

— Giles 1914, A. 945

In 946 Edmund was assassinated (Note: The annals suggest that Edmund was killed by an outlaw, but some modern historians, for example Kevin Halloran have suggested it might have been a political assassination.) at Pucklechurch.

Edmund was replaced by Eadred who immediately turned his attention to Northumbria, where according to the Anglo-Saxon Chronicle, he "subdued all Northumberland under his power" and obtained oaths of obedience from the Scots.

In 947 Eadred went to the Anglo-Scandinavian town of Tanshelf, where Archbishop Wulfan and the Northumbrian witan submitted to him.

=== Scandinavian rule reestablished 947–954 ===
Eric Bloodaxe capitalizing on the deteriorating political situation in York, established himself as king. Eadred's response was to raid Northumbria and drive Eric out. Olaf Cuaran was reestablished as king from 950 to 952. Olaf's rule was short-lived as in 952 Eric removed him and then reigned in Northumbria till 954.

=== The Earldom of York 954–1066 ===
Scandinavian domination came to an end when Eadred's forces killed Eric Bloodaxe at the Battle of Stainmore in 954. The whole area was then governed by earls, (Note: The honorific title "Earl" was Anglo-Scandinavian in origin. At the time of the Norman Conquest Northumbria was one of only seven Earldoms for all of England. The earl was appointed by the king to rule a territory in his stead. The title of Earl was the highest rank below the king. In English counties where there was no earl in charge the king would appoint a Shire-Reeve to govern in his place.) from the local nobility, who were appointed by the kings of England.

In 975 the king of England Edgar died suddenly. The succession was contested between his two sons Edward and Æthelred. Edward became king but was killed under suspicious circumstances in 978. Æthelred replaced him as ruler and in 1002 he was told that the Danish men in his territory "would faithlessly take his life, and then all his councillors, and possess his kingdom afterwards". In response, he ordered the deaths of all Danes living in England. (Note: The historian Ann Williams writes that the Brice's day decree was aimed at Viking combatants of questionable loyalty and not at the general Scandinavian population. The contemporary writers of the day had coloured the story with "half-truths, tales and legends" to blacken further Æthelred's reputation.) What is now known as the St Brice's Day massacre was carried out on 13 November 1002.

It is thought that the massacre provoked the king of Denmark, Sweyn Forkbeard, whose sister and brother-in-law are said to have been killed, to invade England in 1003. The onslaught continued until 1014 when Æthelred and his family were driven into exile and Sweyn installed as king of England. However he only reigned for five weeks before dying.

After Sweyn's death, his son Cnut became the leader of the Danish army and Æthelred returned to England. Æthelred drove Cnut out of England and back to Denmark. Then in 1015, Cnut relaunched the campaign against England.

Meanwhile, in 1016 Æthelred died and was succeeded by his son, Edmund Ironside. Edmund and his forces were decisively beaten by Cnut at the Battle of Ashingdon. After the battle, Cnut made a treaty with Edmund whereby Edmund would be king of Wessex and Cnut would rule the rest of England.

Ironside died just a few weeks after the treaty. Cnut then became king of all England. He divided England into four semi-independent earldoms using a system of governance based on the Scandinavian system of the time. He appointed his most trusted followers as earls, with the Norwegian Erik of Hlathir appointed to the Earldom of Northumbria. The previous Earl of Northumbria, Uhtred, had been murdered, probably on Cnut's orders. Although a Scandinavian king ruled all of England, Northumbria was not well integrated into the rest of the country.

Siward became the last Scandinavian Earl of Northumbria when he succeeded Erik in about 1033. He governed for 22 years without difficulty. On Siward's death in 1055, the king of England, Edward the Confessor, chose a West Saxon to govern Yorkshire, in place of Siward's son, Waltheof. Edward's choice, Tostig Godwinson, was unpopular with locals. In 1065 Tostig was deposed by the northern nobility and replaced with Morcar (the brother of Edwin of Mercia). The northerners choice of new earl was accepted by Edward.

After Edward the Confessor's death in 1066, Harold Godwinson became King of England. He visited York early in his reign and according to the Anglo-Saxon Chronicle returned to Westminster at Easter 1066. In September 1066 Tostig was back on the scene this time with his ally, Harald Hardrada of Norway. On 20 September 1066 the allies defeated, the northern earls, Morcar and Edwin at the Battle of Fulford. The people of York submitted to Tostig and Hardrada who did not occupy the city. Five days later Tostig and Hardrada were defeated and killed, by Harold Godwinson, at the Battle of Stamford Bridge. Shortly after William of Normandy landed at Pevensey on 28 September and on 13 October Harold of England fought his last battle on the Sussex coast at Hastings. Although William had won the battle it took several years for the Normans to consolidate their rule over England. It is likely that the Conqueror exercised little authority north of the Humber during 1067 as he simply did not have the troops there to enforce his will although the northern earls did submit to him.

=== Norman rule post 1066 ===
Copsi, a supporter of Tostig, was a native of Northumbria, and his family had a history of ruling Bernicia and, at times, Northumbria. Copsi had fought in Harald Hardrada's army with Tostig, against Harold Godwinson at the Battle of Stamford Bridge. He had managed to escape after Harald's defeat. When Copsi offered homage to William at Barking in 1067, William rewarded him by making him earl of Northumbria. After just five weeks as earl, Copsi was murdered by Osulf, the son of Eadwulf, earl of Bamburgh. When, in turn, the usurping Osulf was also killed, his cousin, Cospatrick, bought the earldom from William. He was not long in power before he joined Edgar Ætheling in rebellion against William the Conqueror in 1068.

William's response was brutal. During the winter of 1069, in an action known as the Harrying of the North, he laid waste to Yorkshire and eventually replaced its nobility with his own trusted men. The Domesday Book entries for Yorkshire, indicates the extent of the Norman Conquest; most of the former landowners who survived the conquest retained only a fraction of their estates, and then as tenants of a Norman lord. With 25 of William's magnates holding 90% of the county's manors, the days when English kings appointed Scandinavian Earls of Northumbria were at an end.

After the Conquest, there were several unsuccessful attempts by Scandinavian kings to regain control of England, the last of which took place in 1086. However raiding did continue and the last recorded one was in 1152, when Eystein II of Norway taking advantage of the confusion caused by the Anarchy looted places on the east coast of Britain, including Yorkshire.

== Commerce ==
=== Coinage ===
Small silver coins, known as sceattas, were minted in England by the early 8th century, and from the late 8th century, locally produced coins of this nature have been excavated in York. The bankrupt nature of the Northumbrian economy is illustrated by the continued production of small silver coins and eventually replacing them with copper pennies (known as stycas) while the other English kingdoms were producing the larger standard silver penny established by Offa of Mercia. The minting of coinage in York was controlled by the Northumbrian monarch and the archbishop.The coins produced by the command of the king seem to have stopped around 850, and Archbishop Wulfhere around 855. The Vikings reintroduced coin minting in York c. 895/896. These coins had a similar design to continental coins, some with short religious texts on them and others with the name of the mint where they were produced, for example EBRAICE for Eboracum (York). Although the York mint's location has not been found, a workshop that produced and tested the dies has been identified at Coppergate.

In about 973, Edgar, King of England, reformed the monetary system to give his lands a uniform currency. This involved approximately sixty moneyers in the various boroughs around the country. The most important mints were in London, Winchester, Lincoln, Chester and York. They produced a standard design so that each coin could be used anywhere in England. The design was changed about every six years. This model for the production of currency remained unchanged until the reign of Henry II, around two hundred years later.

=== Trade ===
Archaeological evidence indicates that Jórvík had a busy international trade with thriving workshops, and well-established mints. York was part of the wider Scandinavian trading system with one route leading to Norway by way of Shetland and another to Sweden, then via the Dnieper and Volga rivers to Byzantium and the Muslim world.

York was a major manufacturing centre particularly in metalwork, with Jórvík craftspeople sourcing their raw materials both near and far. There was gold and silver coming from Europe, copper and lead from the Pennines and tin from Cornwall. Also, there was amber from the Baltic for the production of jewellery, and soapstone probably from Norway or Shetland, used to make large cooking pots. Wine was imported from the Rhineland and silk, used to make into caps for sale, came from Byzantium.

== Religion ==
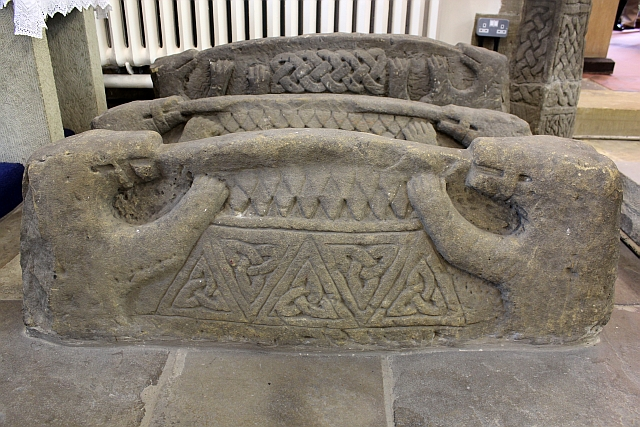
Hogbacks in All Saints Church, Brompton-in-Allerton, North Riding of Yorkshire. Elongated rounded stones with beasts clasping each end.

Christianity had been established in Northumbria by the end of the 7th century. Very little evidence of the old Viking pagan religion in Yorkshire has been found although there is coin evidence minted during Ragnall I's reign, from the 10th century, that had Thor's hammer on them. The arrival of the pagan Vikings seems to have had little effect on the Christian religion, with the incoming Scandinavians converting to Christianity within a few decades of their arrival and largely adopting local burial customs, however there are stone crosses and grave markers, that introduced Scandinavian motifs to the designs and instituted new forms, notably the so-called Hogback gravestone.

Hogbacks were introduced in 10th century, they are a house-shaped stone with a bowed roof ridge and often with bombé long sides, many were accompanied by standing crosses. In England, the incidence of them is most dense in northern Yorkshire, suggesting that the form was initiated in this region.

== Legacy ==
=== Administration ===
==== Ridings ====
Scandinavian Yorkshire was divided into three parts, for administration purposes, these were known as the North Riding, the West Riding and the East Riding. The name Riding derives from the Old Norse þriðjungr meaning "third part". Under Scandinavian rule each Riding was a unitary authority with its own assemblies. They were created during the Scandinavian period and continued until 1974, when they were abolished under the Local Government Act 1972, although the East Riding of Yorkshire was revived as a unitary authority in 1996.

==== Wapentakes ====
From the Old Norse vápnatak an administrative sub division of the Ridings in Yorkshire. The term is of Scandinavian origin and meant the taking of weapons; it later signified the clash of arms by which the people assembled in a local court expressed assent. In Scandinavian York it is likely that initially the Wapentakes were formed by groups of smaller Hundreds but confusingly later on the Wapentake itself was regarded as the direct equivalent to the Anglo-Saxon Hundred. Wapentakes lasted until 1974, when they were phased out by the Local Government Act 1972.

=== Yorkshire dialect ===
The whole speech of the Northumbrians, especially that of the men of York, grates so harshly upon the ear that it is completely unintelligible to us southerners. The reason for this is their proximity to barbaric tribes and their distance from the kings of the land who, whether English as once or Norman as now, are known to stay more often in the south than the north.
(William of Malmesbury 12th century.)

— William of Malmesbury 2002, p. 139

The English language contains many hundreds of words that have a Scandinavian origin. However, in Yorkshire and northern England there are thousands of words with Scandinavian roots. A contemporary local literary tradition plus the large amount of non-Norman population, indicated by the charters of the time, was the basis of the distinct modern Yorkshire dialect.

Examples of words still used in Yorkshire with Scandinavian roots
Word	Means
addle	to earn
agate	busy with
fall	hillside
barn	child
neave	fist
beck	stream
laike	play
dale	valley
kirk	church
ket	rubbish
lug	ear
haver	oats
lig	to lie down
teem	pour out
wark	ache
tig	to touch
Source: John Waddington-Feather. Yorkshire Dialect.

An example, in literature, of the Yorkshire dialect can be found in Emily Brontë's 1847 novel Wuthering Heights, where the servant Josephs dialogue is written in dialect. (Note: K. M. Petyt the sociolinguist and historian, analysed Joseph's dialect and confirmed that it is authentic for that specific area of Yorkshire.) An example, quoting Joseph from Chapter 2 of the book:

What are ye for?' he shouted. 'T' maister's down i' t' fowld. Go round by th' end o' t' laith, if ye went to spake to him.'

'Is there nobody inside to open the door?' I hallooed, responsively. 'There's nobbut t' missis; and shoo'll not oppen 't an ye mak' yer flaysome dins till neeght.' 'Why? Cannot you tell her whom I am, eh, Joseph?'

'Nor-ne me! I'll hae no hend wi't,' muttered the head, vanishing.

— Brontë 1911, Chapter 2 pp. 24–25

In standard English the meaning is:

'What do you want?' he shouted. 'The master's down in the fold [sheep pen]. Go round the end of the barn if you want to speak to him.'

'Is there nobody inside to open the door?' I hallooed, responsively. 'There's nobody but the mistress, and she'll not open it for you if you make your frightening din [noise] till night.' 'Why? Cannot you tell her whom I am, eh, Joseph?'

'Not me. I'll not have anything to do with it,' muttered the head, vanishing.

— The Readers Guide 2023

=== Placenames ===
After the Norman Conquest, the frequency of Anglo-Scandinavian place-names and the absence of Norman-French place-names indicate that the Norman settlers were purely of the top rank.

Scandinavian place-names
Settlement name ends in	Means	Example
~by	Farm, town	Wetherby
~thwaite	Clearing	Yockenthwaite
~thorpe	Hamlet	Scagglethorpe
~toft	Homestead	Langtoft
Glossary source: A. D. Mills Dictionary of English Place-Names

Place-names can give an indication to what an area was used for. For example, in York, the Old Norse placename Konungsgurtha (Kings Court), recorded in the late fourteenth century was possibly the royal residence. It is in the area immediately outside the site of the porta principalis sinistra, the east gatehouse of the Roman encampment, perpetuated today as King's Square, which nucleates the Ainsty. New streets, lined by regular building fronts for timber houses were added to an enlarging city between 900 and 935, dates arrived at by tree-ring chronology carried out on remaining posts preserved in anaerobic clay subsoil.

Many of the city of York's street names end in "~gate". The name derives from the Old Norse "~gata" meaning street. One of the best known of these is Coppergate, which translates as the "street of the woodworkers".

=== Archaeological findings ===
From 1976 to 1981, the York Archaeological Trust conducted a five-year excavation in and around the street of Coppergate in central York. This demonstrated that, in the 10th century, Jórvík's trading connections reached to the Byzantine Empire and beyond: a cap made of silk survives, and coins from Samarkand (Note: Samarkand was part of a major trading route now known as the Silk Road. Various goods from China including silk and coins, would pass through Samarkand.) were familiar enough and respected enough for a counterfeit to have passed in trade. Both these items, as well as a large human coprolite known as the Lloyds Bank coprolite, were famously recovered in York a millennium later. Amber from the Baltic is often expected at a Viking site and at Jórvík an impractical and presumably symbolic axehead of amber was found. A cowrie shell indicates contact with the Red Sea or the Persian Gulf. Although little is known about the internal events of Jórvík, during this time, it is known that there was an accommodation with the church as Christian and pagan objects have survived side-by-side.

After the excavation, the York Archaeological Trust took the decision to recreate the excavated part of Jórvík on the Coppergate site, and this is now the Jorvik Viking Centre.

== See also ==
- Coppergate Helmet
- Ebrauc
- History of York
- Uí Ímair
