= Sichfrith Jarl =

King of Dublin

Sichfrith

King of Dublin (disputed)
- Reign: 893–?
- Predecessor: Sitriuc mac Ímair

King of Jórvík (possibly)
- Predecessor: Guthfrith
- Reign: c. 895–899
- Old Norse: Sigfrøðr

Sichfrith or Sigfrith (Old Norse: Sigfrøðr), also known as Sichfrith Jarl, was a ninth-century Norse or Norse-Gael Jarl who claimed the kingship of Dublin in 893, but it is unclear if he ever ruled. Later historians have linked him with two individuals of the same name. The first, a Northumbrian Viking who a led a fleet south and landed troops in Wessex in 893, and the second, a King of Jórvík who reigned from 895 until around 899.

== Biography ==
Sichfrith is mentioned by name only once in contemporary Irish Annals:

A great dissension among the foreigners of Áth Cliath, and they became dispersed, one section of them following Ímar's son, and the other Sigfrith the jarl.

According to Downham, it is possible Sichfrith was able to claim the throne of Dublin by belonging to the same kin-group as the three sons of Ímar who ruled Dublin consecutively from 873 until at least 893. Both Sichfrith and his rival to the kingship, Sitriuc mac Ímair, left Ireland in 893 to war in Britain. Sitriuc returned the following year but it is not clear if he or Sichfrith remained king.

A commander named Sichfrith led the Northumbrian fleet against Wessex in 893. Though there is no way to know for sure if this Sichfrith and the one mentioned in the Irish Annals are the same, it is certainly plausible, and it is likely that there was contact between the Viking kingdoms of Northumbria and Dublin during this period. Two competing theories have been put forward for Sichfrith's origins. Smyth has proposed Sichfrith was a Northumbrian who sailed to Dublin after his fleet landed troops in Wessex. According to this theory Sichfrith failed to take the city and caused the split noted by the Annals of Ulster. Angus instead proposes that Sichfrith was a Dubliner who left for England after he failed to take the throne. Smyth's explanation is considered more likely since Æthelweard in his Chronicon implies Sichfrith was a Northumbrian.

Coins bearing the name Sigfrøðr were found in the Cuerdale Hoard, indicating a king of that name ruling Jórvík until about 900, succeeding Guthfrith. Smyth and others have proposed that this Sigfrøðr is the same person as the Sichfrith mentioned in the Irish Annals and by Æthelweard. These coins are the only evidence for a king of Jórvík of that name. Ashley gives the approximate dates of 895 until 899 for his reign.
