= Furness Hoard =

Viking silver hoard

Coordinates: 54.20°N 3.15°W

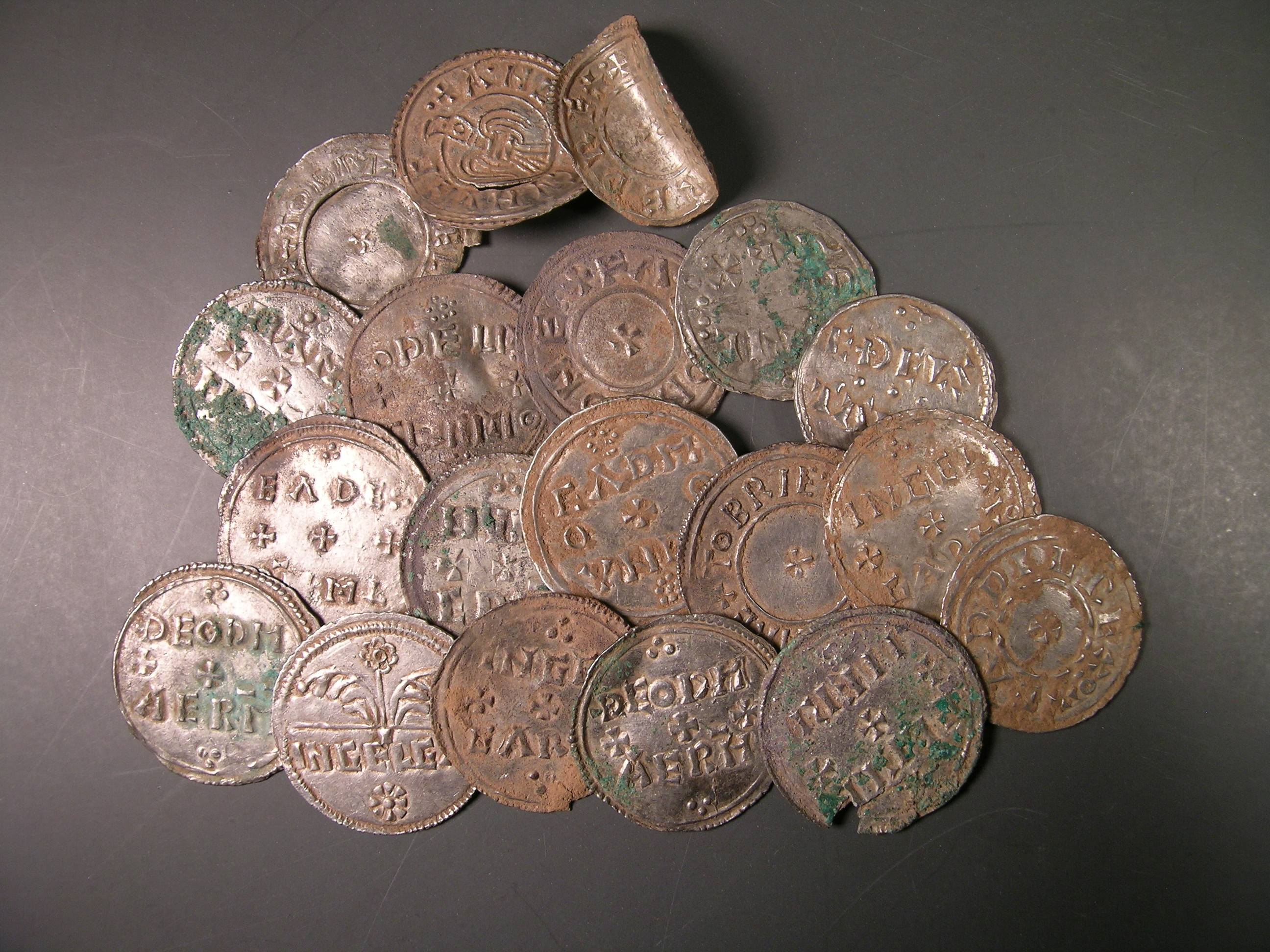
- Coins from the Furness Hoard
- Material: Silver coins, ingots and jewellery
- Size: 92 silver coins and artefacts
- Created: 9th and 10th century
- Period/culture: Viking
- Discovered: May 2011
- Present location: Dock Museum, Barrow-in-Furness

The Furness Hoard is a hoard of Viking silver coins and other artefacts dating to the 9th and 10th Century that was discovered in Furness, Cumbria, England in May 2011 by an unnamed metal detectorist. The exact location of the find, as well as the names of the finder and the landowner, have not been made public.

== Description ==
The hoard comprises 79 silver coins, including two Arabic dirhams, several silver ingots, and one silver bracelet. The hoard is thought to have been deposited in about AD 955.

== Significance ==
This is the largest Viking hoard ever to have been found in the Furness area, and has been described as a "missing link" because it is the first significant archaeological evidence of Norse inhabitation in the area even though many local place names, such as Barrow, Yarlside, Roa Island and Ormsgill, are Old Norse in origin.

== Display ==
The hoard has been held at the Dock Museum in Barrow-in-Furness since discovery, and the Dock Museum has indicated that it hopes to acquire the hoard after it has been valued by the Treasure Valuation Committee.

== See also ==
- List of hoards in Great Britain
- Cuerdale Hoard
- Penrith Hoard
- Silverdale Hoard
- Vale of York Hoard
- Spillings Hoard
