= Cnut of Northumbria =

10th-century Norse King of Northumbria

Cnut

King of Northumbria
- Reign: c. 900–905
- Predecessor: Siefredus or Airdeconut
- Successor: Æthelwold or Eowils and Halfdan
- Old Norse: Knútr

Cnut (Old Norse: Knútr (Note: The Old Norse spelling is that used by Downham.), Latin: Cnvt) was a Norse King of Northumbria. Numismatic evidence suggests he ruled from around 900 until 905, succeeding Siefredus.

== Discovery ==
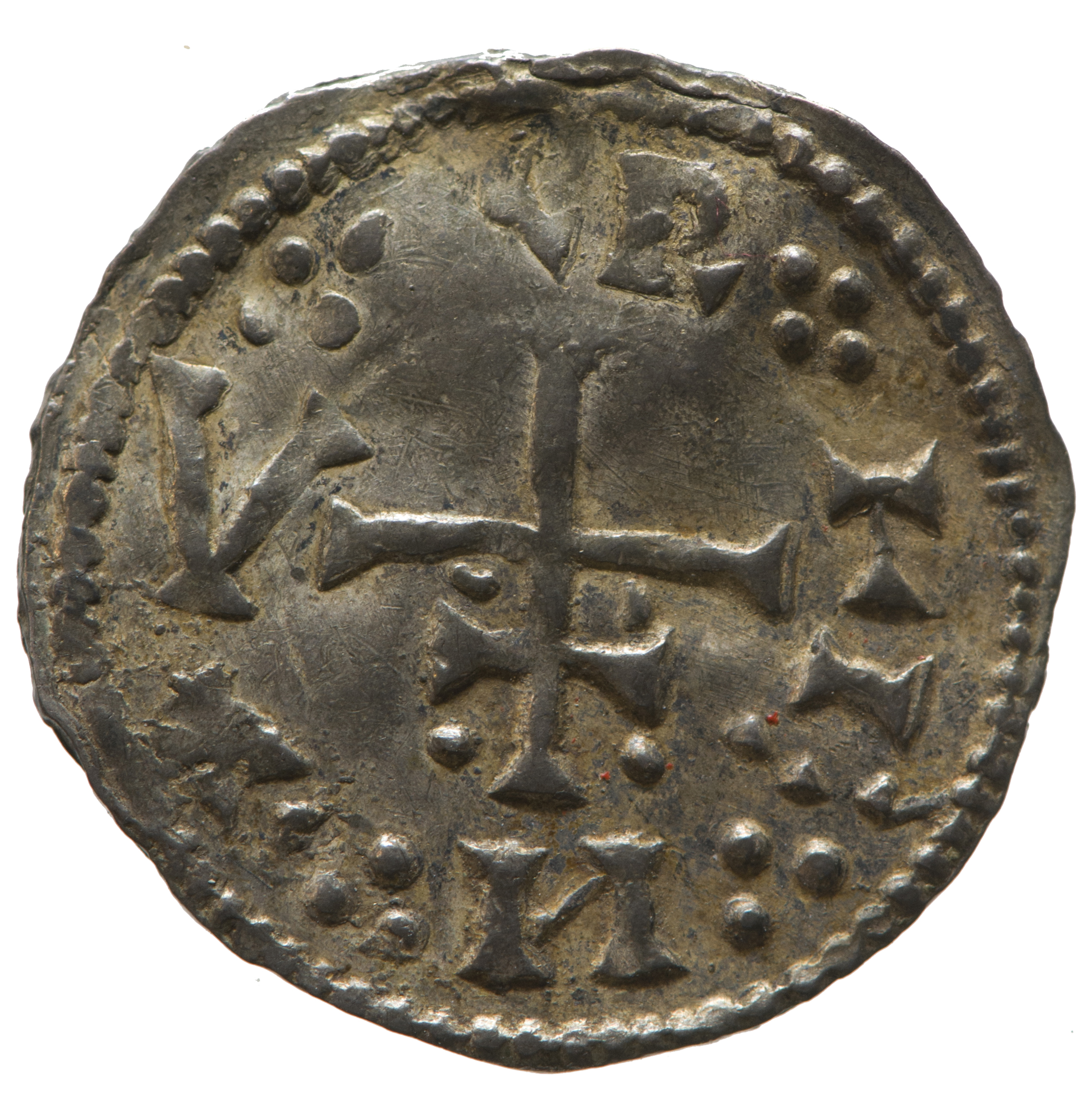
Silver penny of Cnut of Northumbria

In 1840 a hoard of over 8,000 items (known as the Cuerdale Hoard) was found in Cuerdale, Lancashire, England. Around 3,000 Northumbrian silver coins bearing the inscription CNVT REX (King Cnut) were found as part of this hoard, indicating the existence of a previously unknown Viking King of Northumbria. A number of different inscriptions appeared on the reverses of these coins, including the inscription ELFRED REX (King Alfred), indicating Cnut must have been contemporary with Alfred the Great. The name of another previously-unknown king, Siefredus, also appears on coins found in the Cuerdale Hoard. The sequence of coin issues indicates that Cnut ruled after Siefredus, from around 900 until 905. It also suggests Siefredus succeeded Guthfrith and ruled from about 895 until 900. The names of both Cnut and Siefredus appear on some coins, perhaps indicating they were co-rulers for a period of time.

== Identity ==
It is difficult to establish Cnut's identity or identify any biographical details since he is not mentioned in any contemporary source. The historian Alfred Smyth has proposed that Cnut may be identifiable with a Cnut who is mentioned in Norse sagas of the thirteenth and fourteenth centuries. This Cnut is said to be a Danish king active in Northumbria. It has also been suggested that Cnut may be another name for Guthfrith, ruler of Northumbria from 883 to 895, for whom no coins exist. Another suggestion put forward by Cannon and Hargreaves is that Cnut is identical to Siefredus.

== See also ==
- Airdeconut
