= Siefredus of Northumbria =

Siefredus

King of Northumbria
- Reign: c. 895–900
- Predecessor: Guthfrith
- Successor: Cnut or Airdeconut
- Old Norse: Sigfrøðr

Siefredus (Old Norse: Sigfrøðr) (Note: The Old Norse spelling is that used by Downham. Anglicisations sometimes used by scholars include Sigfrid and Siefried.) was a Norse King of Northumbria. Numismatic evidence suggests he ruled from around 895 until 900, succeeding Guthfrith.

== Discovery ==
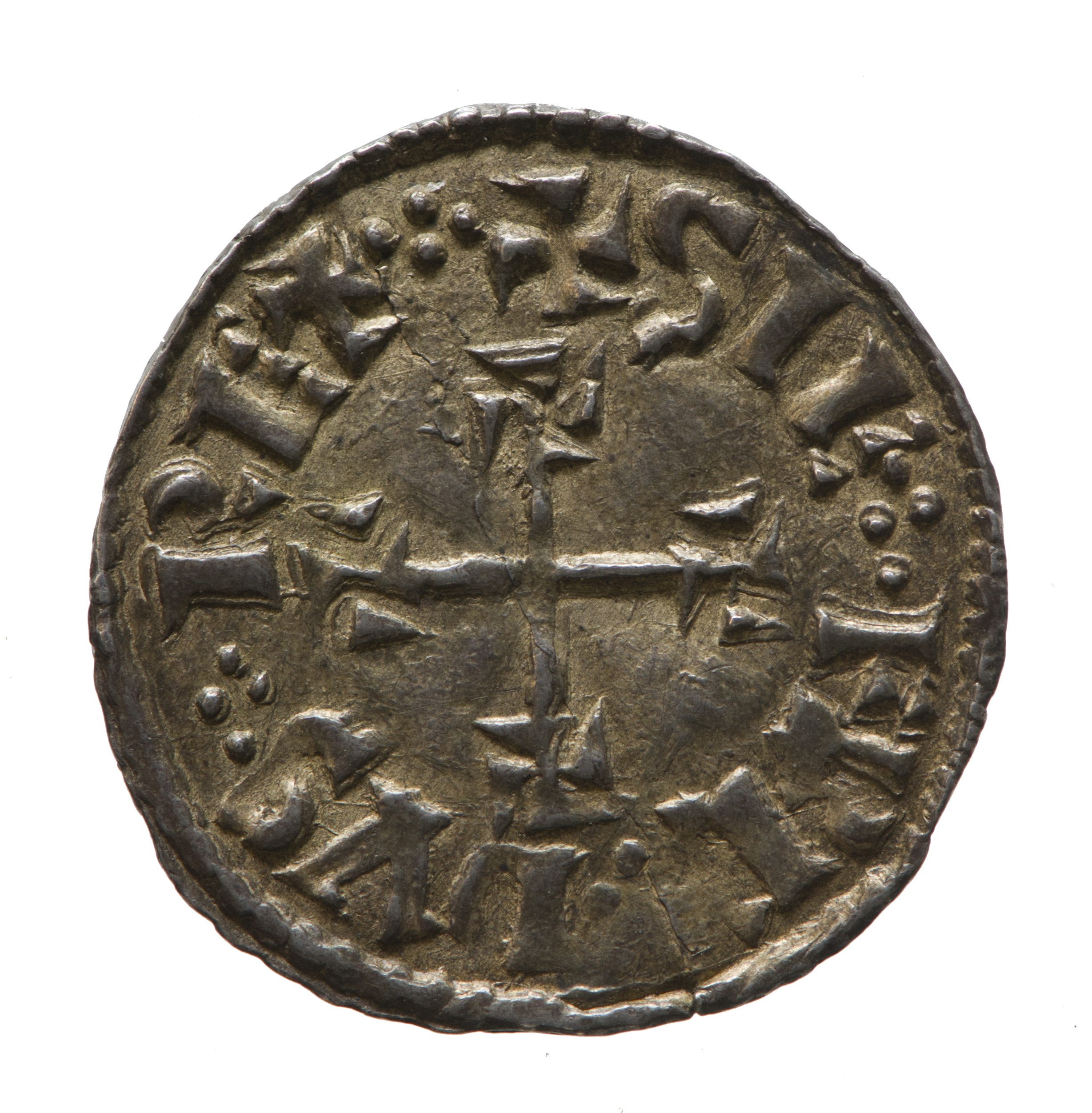
Silver penny of Siefredus

In 1840 a hoard of over 8,000 items (known as the Cuerdale Hoard) was found in Cuerdale, Lancashire, England. A number of Northumbrian silver coins bearing the inscription SIEFREDUS REX (King Siefredus) were found as part of this hoard, indicating the existence of a previously unknown king. The name of another previously-unknown king, Cnut, also appears on coins found in the Cuerdale Hoard. The sequence of coin issues indicates that Cnut ruled after Siefredus, from around 900 until 905. It also suggests Siefredus succeeded Guthfrith and ruled from about 895 until 900. The names of both Cnut and Siefredus appear on some coins, perhaps indicating they were co-rulers for a period of time.

== Identity ==
The historian Alfred Smyth and others have proposed that Siefredus may be the same person as the Sigfrith that led a Viking fleet against Wessex in 893. Moreover, it is suggested that he is the same as the Sichfrith who claimed the Kingdom of Dublin in that same year. Though there is no way to know for sure if this Sichfrith and the one mentioned in the Irish Annals are the same, it is certainly plausible, and it is likely that there was contact between the Viking kingdoms of Northumbria and Dublin during this period. Two competing theories have been put forward for Siefredus's origins. Smyth has proposed Siefredus was a Northumbrian who sailed to Dublin after his fleet landed troops in Wessex. According to this theory Siefredus failed to take the city and caused the strife among the Vikings of Dublin noted by the Annals of Ulster. Angus instead proposes that Siefredus was a Dubliner who left for England after he failed to take the throne. Smyth's explanation is considered more likely since Æthelweard in his Chronicon implies Sichfrith was a Northumbrian. An altogether different suggestion, put forward by Cannon and Hargreaves, is that Siefredus is identical to his successor, Cnut.
