= Listed buildings in Cuerdale =

Cuerdale is a civil parish in the South Ribble district of Lancashire, England. It contains five listed buildings that are recorded in the National Heritage List for England. All of the listed buildings are designated at Grade II, the lowest of the three grades, which is applied to "buildings of national importance and special interest". The parish is entirely rural, and without any settlements. All the listed buildings are farmhouses or associated structures.

== Buildings ==
Name and location	Photograph	Date	Notes
Darwen Side Farmhouse; 53.75168°N 2.62025°W	—	1619	The farmhouse was extended in the 18th century and again in about 1900. It is in stone with a slate roof in two storeys. It has an L-shaped plan, with a main range and a rear extension. The main range has four bays, with a stable door in the first bay and a house door in the third bay. Other than the stable door, the openings have chamfered surrounds and hood moulds. Most of the windows are sashes, and there are also three mullioned windows. On the front is a datestone.
Barn, Cuerdale Hall; 53.75867°N 2.64371°W	—	c. 1700 or earlier	The barn is timber-framed with weatherboard cladding on a stone plinth and has a slate roof. It has a rectangular plan with six bays, and contains a large wagon entrance.
Cuerdale Hall; 53.75949°N 2.64380°W		c. 1700	Originally a farmhouse, later divided into two dwellings, it possibly contains earlier material, and was subsequently altered and extended. It is built in brick with stone quoins, it is partly rendered, and there are two storeys. The house has a roughly T-shaped plan with two ranges at right angles. The windows vary, some being sashes, and other dating from later.
Carthouse and stable, Cuerdale Hall; 53.75922°N 2.64386°W	—	c. 1700 (probable)	The building has a front wall of sandstone, the other walls of brick, on a plinth, and with a slate roof. It has a long rectangular plan and is in two storeys. On the front, the right half has a continuous opening with a re-used lintel, and in the upper storey are four square pitching holes. The rear wall contains a blocked mullioned window.
Wood House Farmhouse; 53.75389°N 2.64257°W		Early 18th century (probable)	The farmhouse is in rendered brick on a plinth with stone dressings and a slate roof. There are two storeys and a symmetrical two-bay front. In the ground floor are three sash windows, in the upper floor the central window is blocked, and the other two are top-hung casements.
