= Silverdale Hoard =

Silver hoard discovered in Lancashire, England

Coordinates: 54.17°N 2.83°W

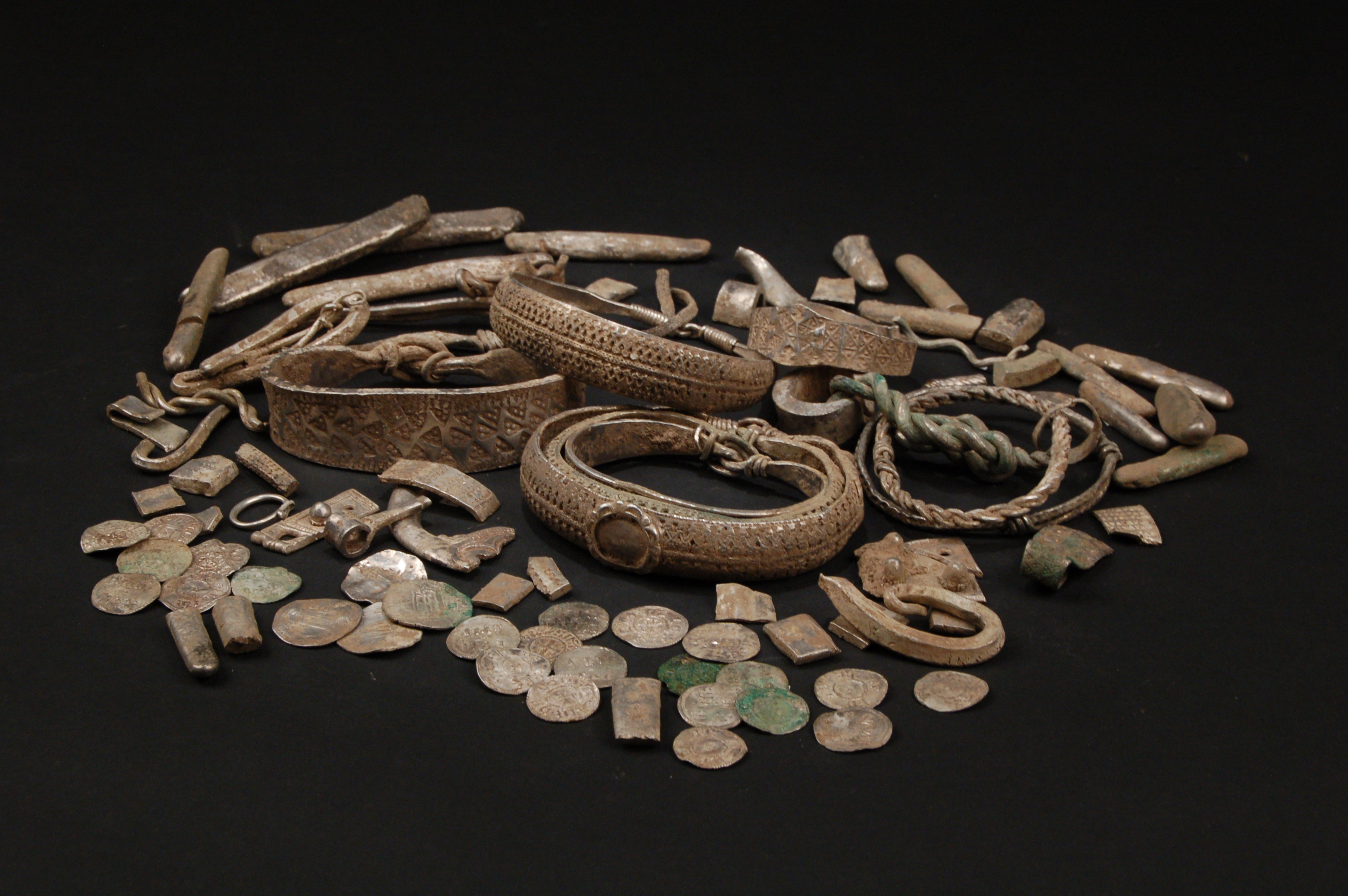
Selection of objects from the Silverdale Hoard

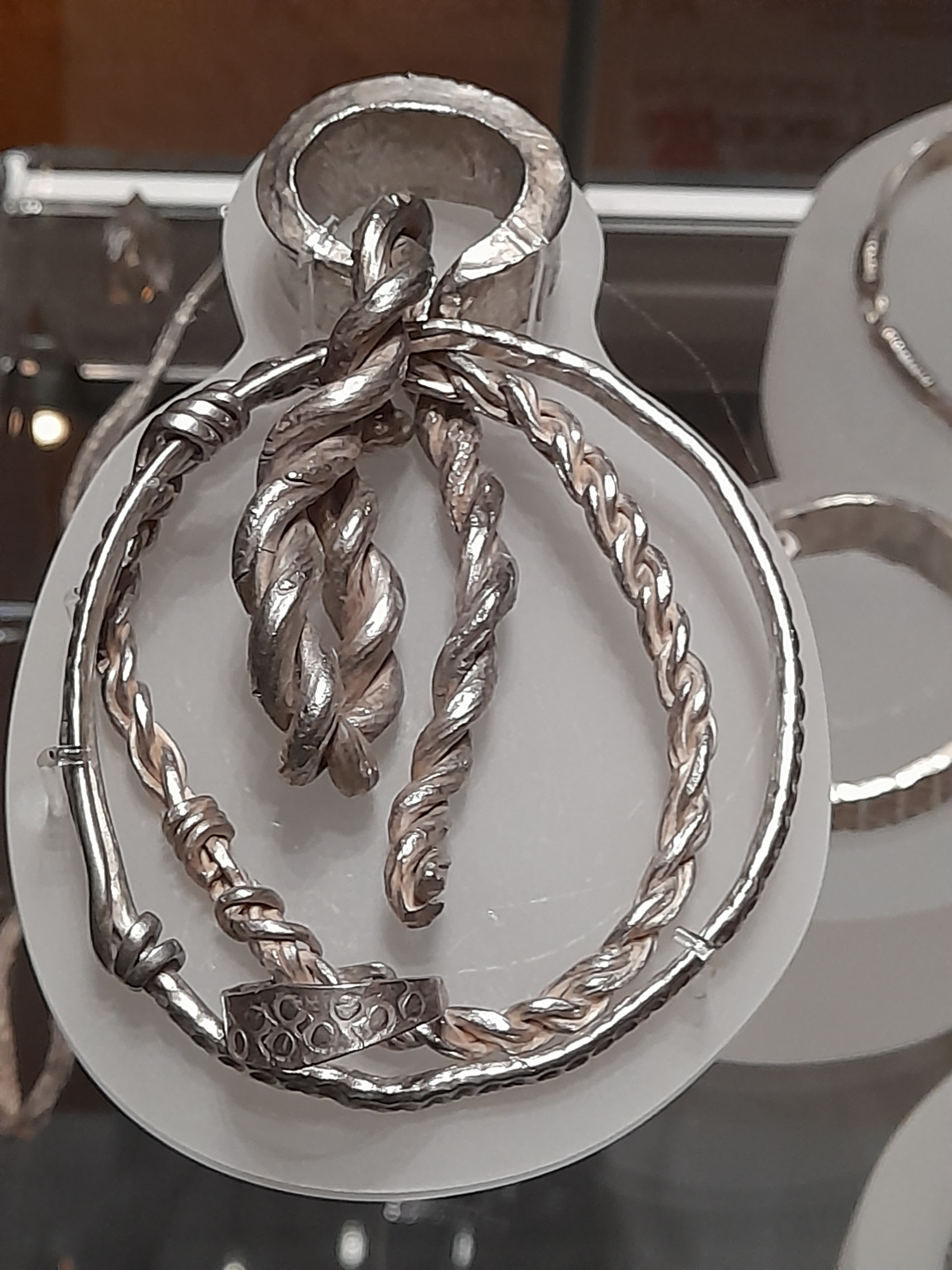
Items from the hoard in 2022 after conservation

The Silverdale Hoard is a collection of over 200 pieces of silver jewellery and coins discovered near Silverdale, Lancashire, England, in September 2011. The items were deposited together in and under a lead container buried about 16 inches (41 cm) underground which was found in a field by a metal detectorist. It is believed to date to around AD 900, a time of intense conflict between the Anglo-Saxons and the Danish settlers of northern England. The hoard is one of the largest Viking hoards ever discovered in the UK. It has been purchased by Lancashire Museums Service and has been displayed at Lancaster City Museum and the Museum of Lancashire in Preston. It is particularly significant for its inclusion of a coin stamped with the name of a previously unknown Viking ruler.

== Discovery ==
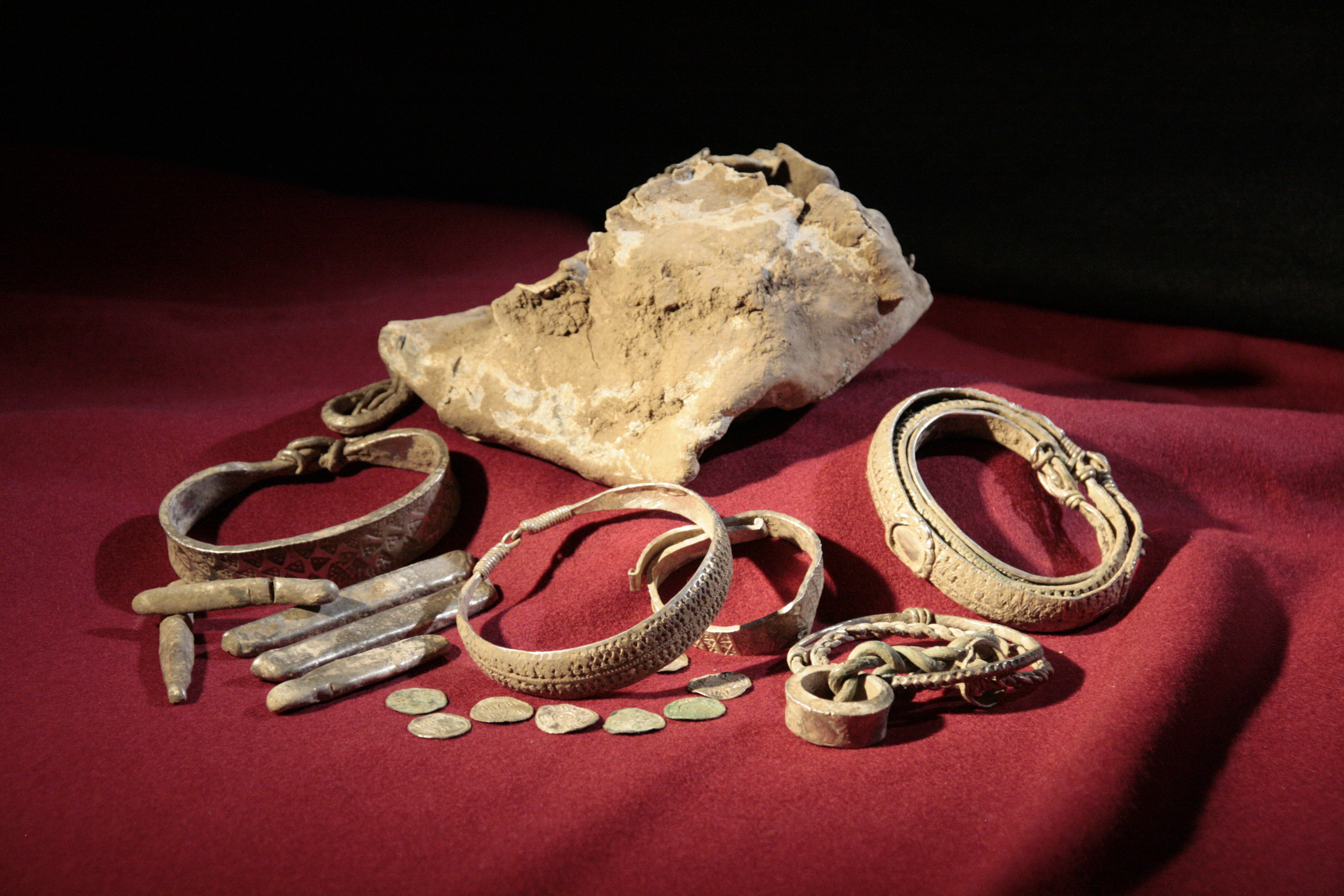
Items from the hoard including the lead container

The hoard was discovered by local metal detectorist Darren Webster after 20 minutes of detecting in a field that he had previously searched several times before without finding anything more significant than a Tudor half-groat. His wife had given him the detector the previous Christmas as a present, and he was taking a short time off to try his luck before heading to work. When he found the casket he was initially disappointed, as it appeared to be merely a sheet of lead, but when he lifted it he found that it had been shaped into a container from which silver objects spilled out as he raised it. According to Webster, "the minute I found [the silver] I knew what it was or had a very good idea what it was." He realised immediately that it was "more than likely Viking." The find was reported to the Portable Antiquities Scheme's local Finds Liaison Officer and the items were taken to the British Museum for weighing, analysing, cataloguing and cleaning.

== Items discovered ==
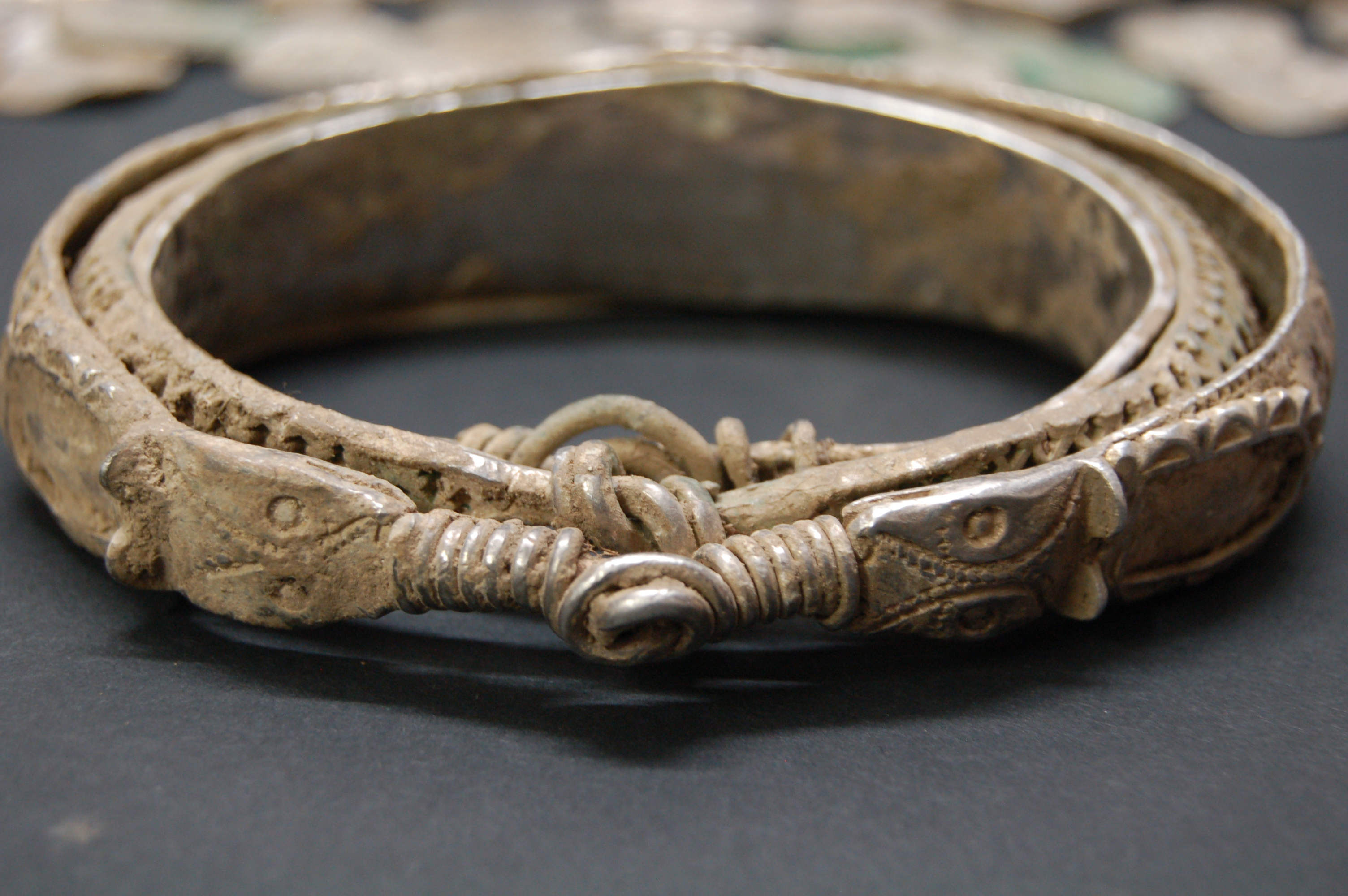
A nested silver bracelet from the hoard, unusual for its combination of Irish, Anglo-Saxon and Carolingian-style decorative elements

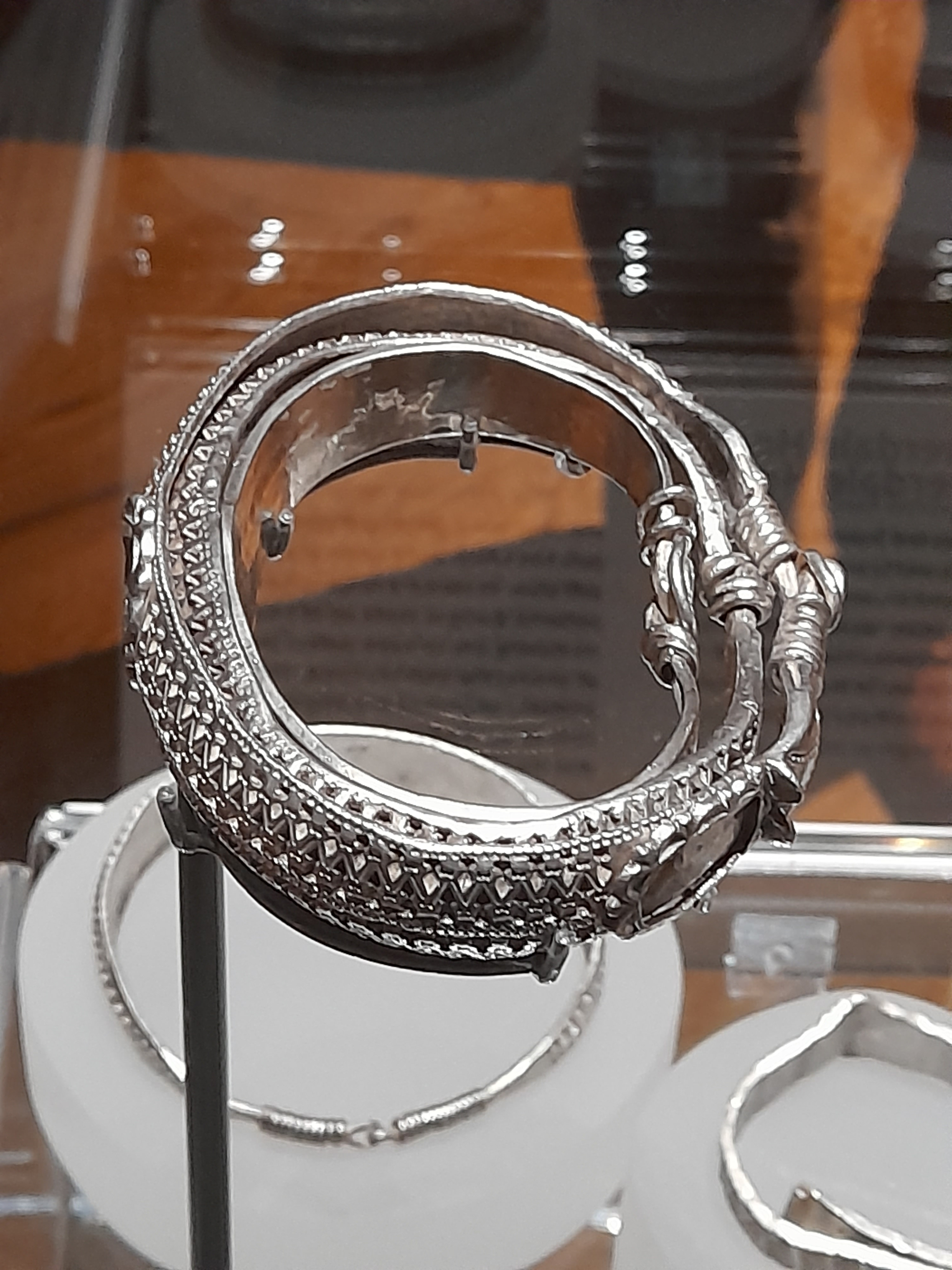
The nested armbands in 2022 after conservation

The hoard consists of a variety of silver items including 27 coins, 10 arm-rings, two finger-rings, 14 ingots, six brooch fragments, a fine wire braid and 141 fragments of arm-rings and ingots which had been chopped up and turned into hacksilver, which was used as a form of currency in Viking times. Together they weigh a little over two pounds (1 kg). The hoard includes Arabic, Anglo-Saxon, Anglo-Viking and Viking coins. They date to around AD 900 and include coins of Alfred the Great and the Danish-ruled Kingdom of Northumbria. Some of the other items appear to have been intended for personal ornamentation, perhaps to indicate the owner's rank. The arm bands would have been given by a leader to a warrior as a reward for services rendered. One of the bands is particularly notable for its unusual combination of Irish, Anglo-Saxon and Carolingian-style decoration.

One coin of a previously unknown design carries the name AIRDECONUT. This appears to be a rendition of the Scandinavian name Harthacnut ("tough-knot"). The reverse has the letters DNS (Dominus) REX (King) arranged in the form of a cross, indicating a Christian affiliation. Its design is related to coins issued by the Northumbrian Viking rulers Sigfroðr and Knútr, who may have ruled the kingdom jointly between 895 and 905. The name Airdeconut is previously unrecorded and appears to refer to an otherwise unknown Viking ruler. He is believed to be the first newly identified medieval ruler in England in the last 50 years, and the first "new" Viking king to be identified since 1840.

Another important coin is a silver penny of about 900–902 which is inscribed ALVVALDVS (Alwaldus) on the obverse. This is believed to refer to Æthelwold, a son of Alfred's elder brother, King Æthelred I. After Alfred's death in 899, he attempted to claim the throne, and then fled to Northumbria, where he was accepted as a king. Æthelwold was killed at the Battle of the Holme in 902.

The hoard is the largest Viking treasure found in the UK since the discovery of the Vale of York Hoard in 2007 and is the fourth-largest Viking hoard found in the UK. It has striking similarities with the much larger Cuerdale Hoard, found in 1840 about 40 miles (64 km) away. Both hoards are thought to have been buried around AD 900 at a time of conflict between the Viking settlers of northern England and the Anglo-Saxons, whose kings Alfred the Great and Edward the Elder sought to re-establish Anglo-Saxon control over Danish-ruled territory in England. It would have been worth a considerable amount at the time, perhaps the equivalent of a herd of sheep or cattle. The fact that the hoard's owner never returned to claim it may indicate that they did not survive the unrest.

== Display and disposal ==
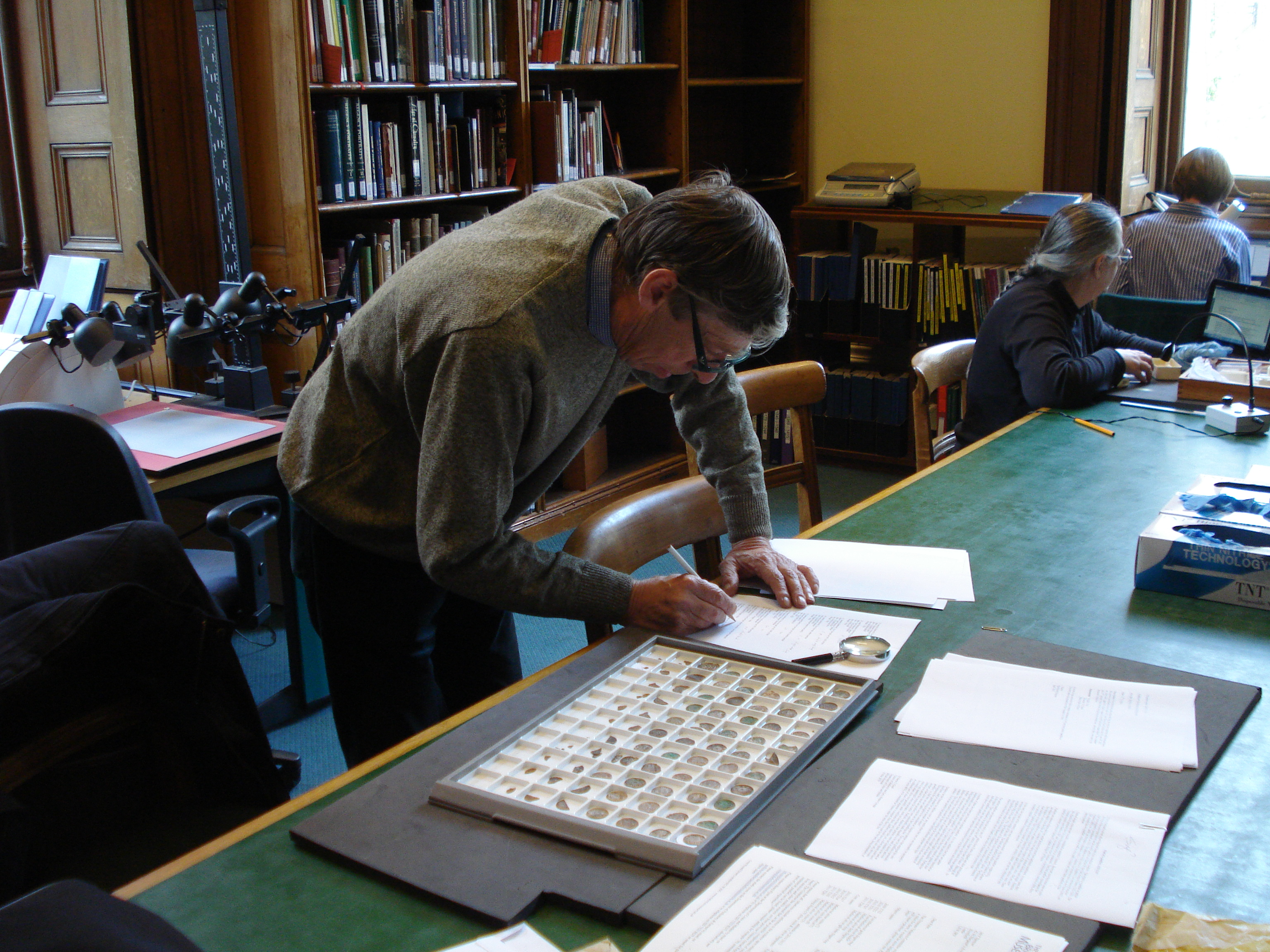
Numismatist Peter Spencer examining coins at the British Museum to provide an independent valuation for the hoard.

The British Museum displayed a selection of the finds from mid-December 2011 through to the New Year, in conjunction with the launch of the annual reports on the Portable Antiquities Scheme and the Treasure Act 1996. On 16 December 2011, the hoard was determined by a Lancashire coroner to be treasure. The independent Treasure Valuation Committee then carried out an evaluation of the hoard's monetary value and a reward was shared between its finder and the landowner. The Lancaster City Museum expressed an interest in acquiring the hoard if it could raise enough money to purchase it. The hoard was eventually valued at £110,000 and it was reported in May 2013 that Lancaster City Council believed it would be "unaffordable" to purchase and conserve the hoard in the city, but hoped that Lancashire County Council could acquire it with a financial contribution from the city.

In October 2013, it was announced that the hoard had been purchased by Lancashire County Museum Service with the assistance of grants of £45,000 from the National Heritage Memorial Fund and £33,000 from the National Art Fund. It formed the basis of a display "The Silverdale Hoard: the Story So Far" in Lancaster City Museum from 25 October to 21 December 2013, which attracted record visitor numbers to the museum. It was subsequently moved to the Museum of Lancashire, Preston, being displayed from 15 February to 7 December 2014. It was then to be the subject of further research and conservation work. The Museum of Lancashire closed on 30 September 2016, although remaining open for pre-booked school groups.

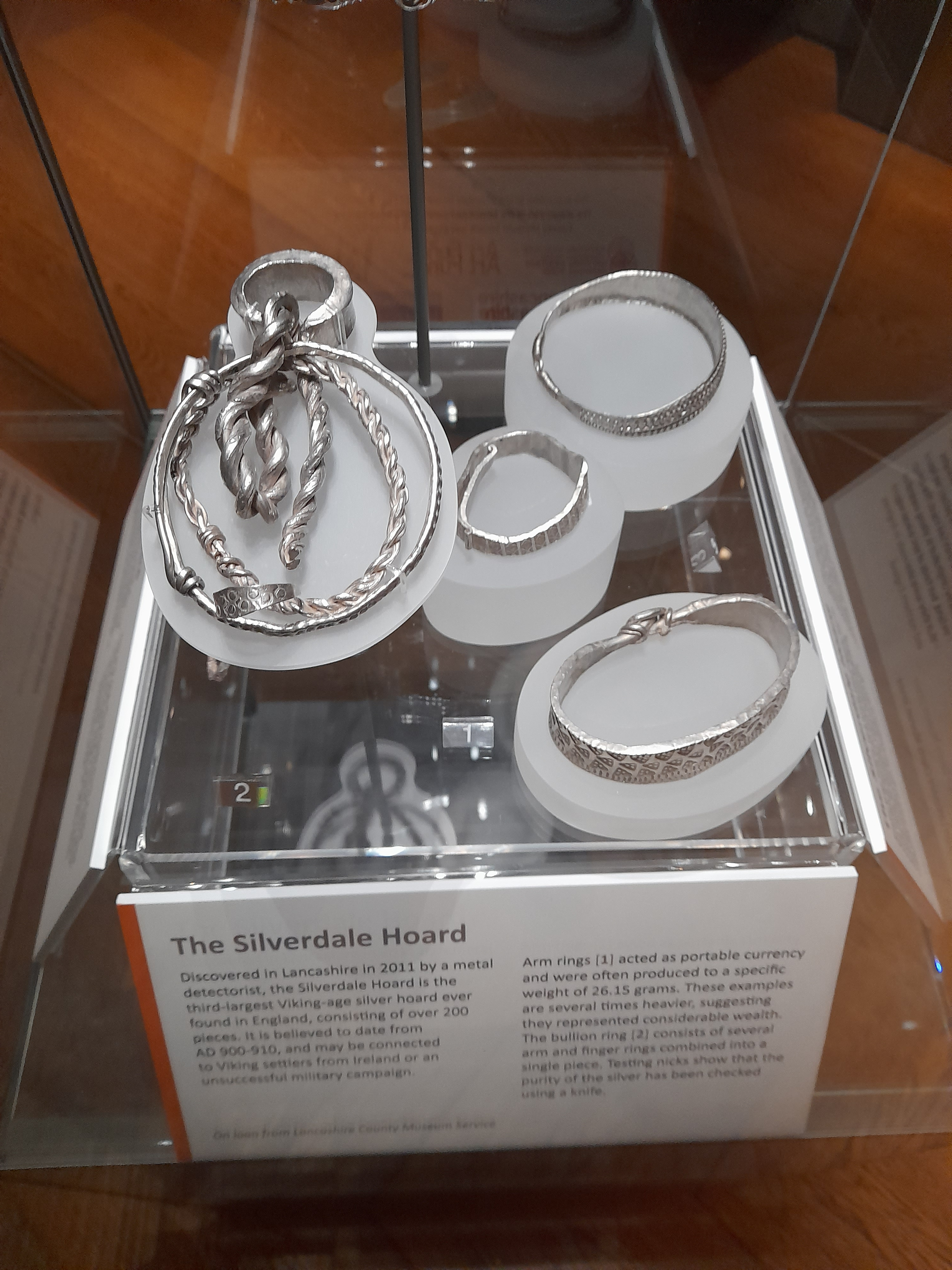
First showcase at Jorvik 2022 (top stand, with nested armbands, missing from shot)

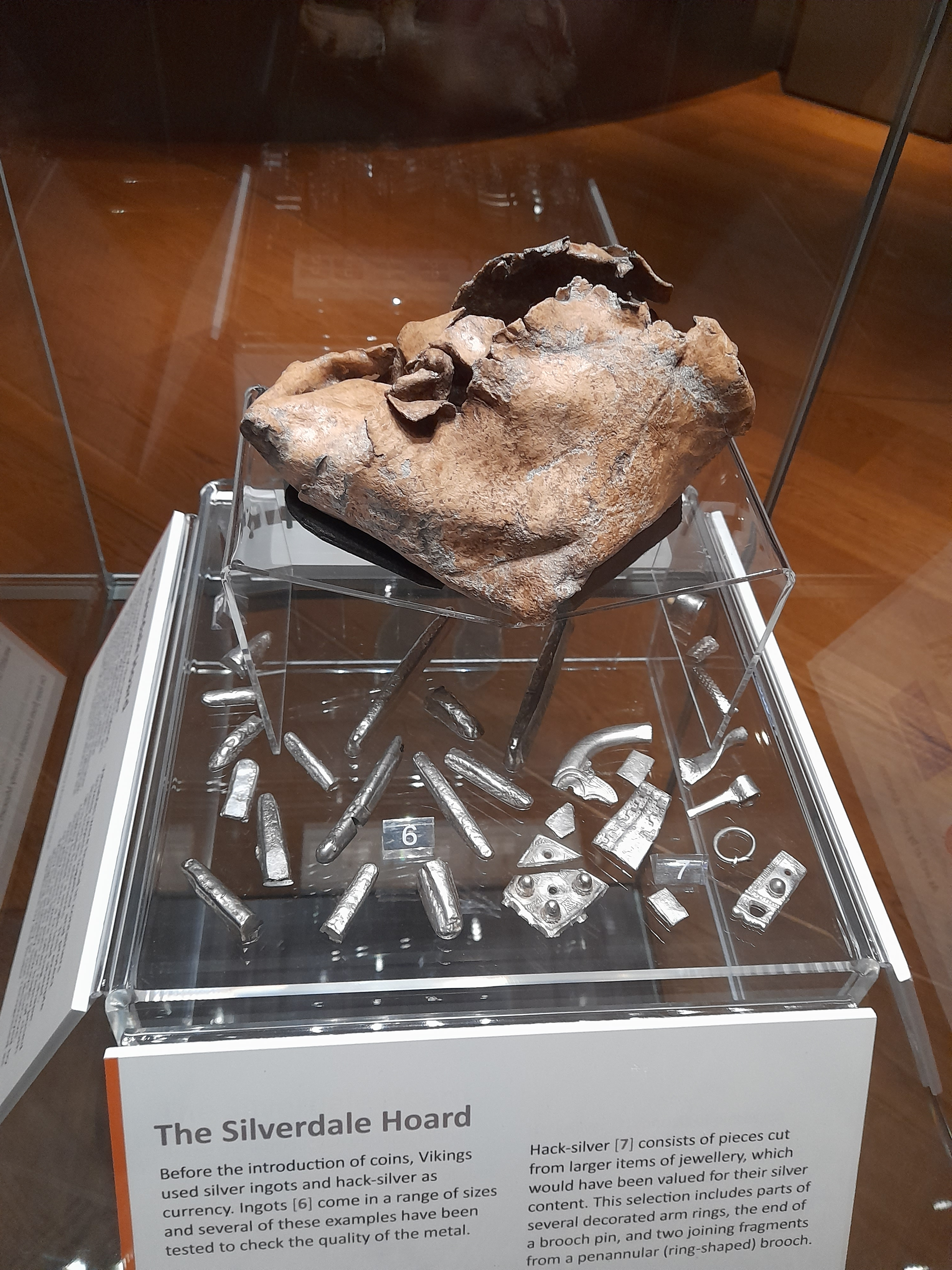
Second showcase at Jorvik 2022, including the lead container

The hoard was on display in the Harris Museum, Preston, June-August 2019 as part of an exhibition "Fearsome Craftsmen" displaying Viking craft. In February 2020, plans were announced for a bid to the National Lottery Heritage Fund for £96,000 to support a temporary display of the hoard in Silverdale village library, but this did not take place because of COVID-19. From February 2022 to October 2023, the Silverdale Hoard went on display for a year in the Jorvik Viking Centre in York; the items had undergone further conservation since last displayed to the public.

== See also ==
- List of hoards in Great Britain
- Cuerdale Hoard
- Furness Hoard
- Penrith Hoard
- Vale of York Hoard
- Spillings Hoard
