= Guthred =

King of Northumbria
- Reign: c. 883 – 24 August 895 (or perhaps 894)
- Predecessor: Ecgberht II
- Successor: Sigfroðr or Knútr (or both)
- Died: 24 August 895 (or perhaps 894)
- Burial: York Minster, York
- Father: Hardacnut
- Religion: unknown, probably syncretic

Guthred Hardacnutsson (Old Norse: Guðfriðr; Latin: Guthfridus; born c. 844 – died 24 August 895 AD) was the second viking king of Northumbria from circa 883 until his death.

== Life ==
=== Kings of Northumbria in the Norse era ===
The first known king of Viking York, Halfdan, was expelled in 877. In c. 883, Symeon of Durham's History of the Kings simply states, "Guthred, from a slave, was made king", but his History of the Church of Durham gives a longer account. Here he writes that after Halfdan was driven out:

During this time the [Viking] army, and such of the inhabitants as survived, being without a king, were insecure; whereupon the blessed Cuthbert himself appeared in a vision to abbot Eadred [of the monastery at Carlisle]...[and] addressed him in the following words:—"Go to the army of the Danes," he said, "and announce to them that you are come as my messenger; and ask where you can find a lad named Guthred, the son of Hardacnut, whom they sold to a widow. Having found him, and paid the widow the price of his liberty, let him be brought forward before the whole aforesaid army; and my will and pleasure is, that he be elected and appointed king at Oswiesdune, (that is, Oswin's hill), and let the bracelet be placed upon his right arm.

It is not clear whether Guthred was a Christian, but his relations with the community of Saint Cuthbert, which was a major force in the former Bernicia, and which had lain outside the influence of Halfdan, whose authority was limited to the former Deira—approximately Yorkshire—were good. He granted much land between the River Tyne and the River Wear to the community. This had once belonged to the Monkwearmouth–Jarrow Abbey, and formed the core lands of the church of Durham. Other lands, at the mouth of the River Tees, Guthred allowed Eadred to purchase for the church.

Symeon recounts that Guthred faced a large invasion by the Scots, which was defeated with the aid of Saint Cuthbert.

== Death ==
Guthred died on 24 August 895 (or perhaps 894) and was buried at York Minster.

The 11th-century historian Adam of Bremen cited a lost work called- Gesta Anglorum, reporting that king Guthred succeeded Halfdan, and after him, his sons, Olaf, Sigfred and Ragnald were kings of Northumbria. Some of those kings may be the same the later kings of Jorvik: Sitric Cáech and Ragnall ua Ímair - both grandsons of Imar. Thus, Guthred has been speculated to be a son or son-in-law of Imar. If he was a son of Imar, this would make him a member of the same Uí Ímair dynasty who would rule Jorvik throughout the early 10th century.

== Cultural depictions ==
=== Literature ===
Guthred appears as a character in Bernard Cornwell's The Saxon Stories series, figuring particularly in The Lords of the North (2006).

=== Television ===
He is portrayed by Thure Lindhardt in the TV adaptation of Cornwell's novel series, The Last Kingdom.

=== Video games ===
In Total War Saga: Thrones of Britannia, Guthred (spelled Guthfrid in the game) leads the playable faction of Northymbre.
