= Ingwær =

King of Northumbria
- Reign: ?–910
- Died: 5 August 910; Tettenhall, Mercia (modern day Wolverhampton)
- Old Norse: Ívarr
- House: Uí Ímair (possibly)

Ingwær (also referred to as Ingvar, Ivar or Ivarr; Old Norse: Ívarr) (Note: The Old Norse spelling is that used by Downham.) was a Norse King of Northumbria. According to Æthelweard's Chronicon he was a co-king of Northumbria along with Eowils and Halfdan, though the Anglo-Saxon Chronicle does not mention him. By Æthelweard's account he died at the Battle of Tettenhall in 910.

== Biography ==
Following the Viking victory at the Battle of the Holme in 902 and the defeat of Æthelwold's Revolt the kings Eowils, Halfdan, and Ingwaer were among the claimants to Viking Northumbria, and were able to successfully establish their rule.

They were probably brothers or cousins and part of the Uí Ímair dynasty, founded by Imar who is often associated with Ivar the Boneless, whose descendants ruled on and off in Northumbria until the mid tenth century.

The population of the Danelaw was boosted in 902 by the arrival of the Vikings of Dublin who were ejected from the city that year. Throughout the first decade of the tenth century the Viking kings of Northumbria, and the Viking king of East Anglia, carried out raids on Anglo-Saxon lands to test the resolve of Edward the Elder, the new king of Wessex. In 910 the three co-kings marched an army south and attacked Wessex. They were driven back by the Anglo-Saxons, and were pursued until Edward's forces caught up with them at Tettenhall on the fifth of August. In the ensuing battle Eowils, Halfdan and Ingwær were killed.

== Identity ==
The identity of Ingwær and his brothers, and the nature of their rule, is subject to some debate. No coins bearing their names are known and it is possible they each ruled different parts of Northumbria, or even that they were simply commanders in the Viking army rather than kings, and their identification as such by contemporary sources is erroneous. Ingwær is known to history through Æthelweard's Latin version of the Anglo-Saxon Chronicle; in the extant Old English manuscripts he does not appear, only Eowils and Halfdan. The names are equivalent to the names of Ímar, Auisle, and Halfdan Ragnarsson, three Vikings active in the British Isles in the ninth century who may have been brothers. David Dumville has suggested this similarity could indicate Ingwær, Eowils and Halfdan are from the same family as the earlier trio, the Uí Ímair. According to Clare Downham, "the coincidence is perhaps too striking to be ignored".
