= Cuerdale =

Coordinates: 53.755334°N 2.638693°W

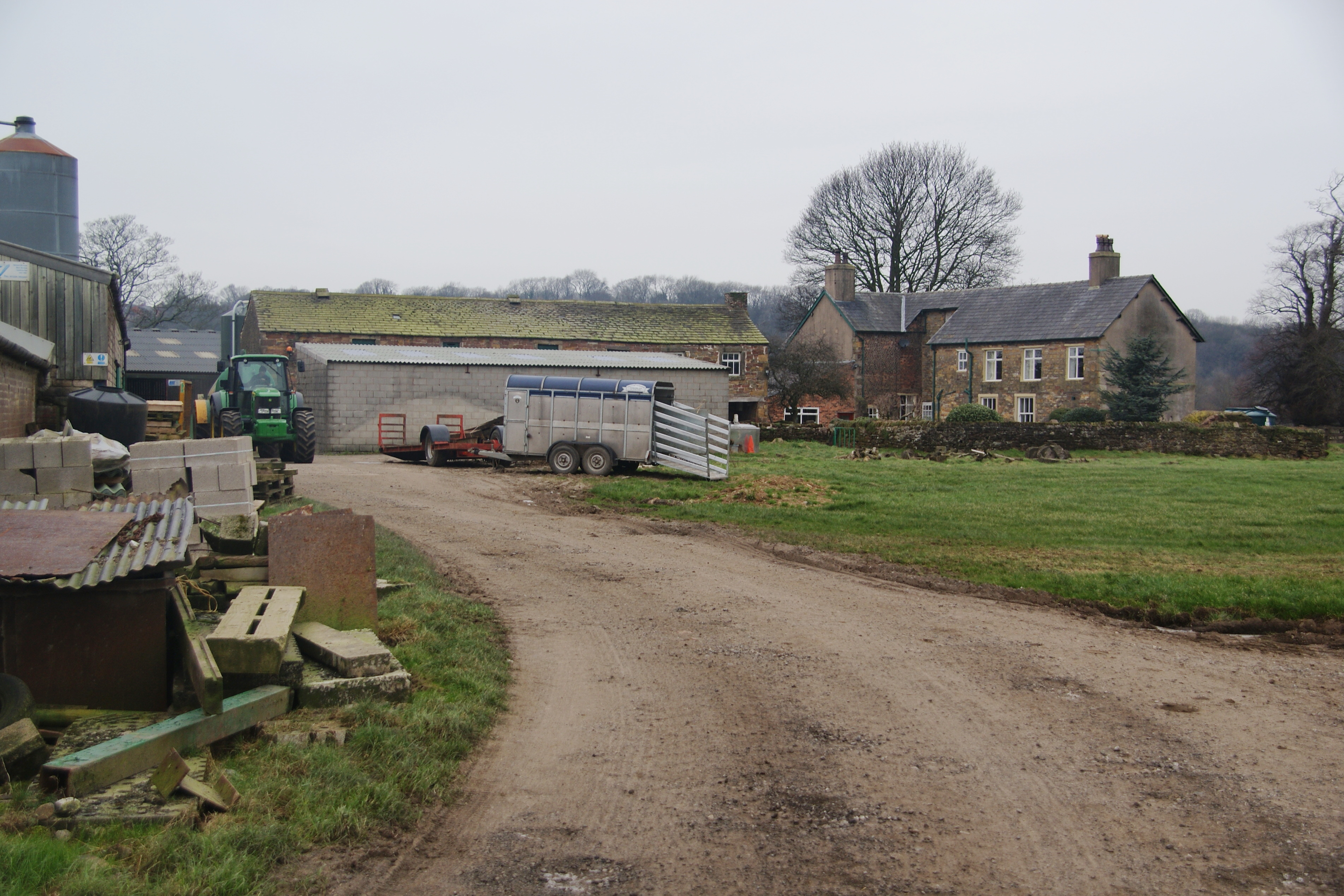
- Cuerdale Hall

- Shown within South Ribble Location within Lancashire
- District: South Ribble
- Shire county: Lancashire
- Region: North West
- Country: England
- Sovereign state: United Kingdom
- Post town: PRESTON
- Postcode district: PR5
- Dialling code: 01772
- Police: Lancashire
- Fire: Lancashire
- Ambulance: North West
- UK Parliament: Ribble Valley (UK Parliament constituency)

Cuerdale is a civil parish in the South Ribble district of Lancashire, England. It includes Cuerdale Hall and has no substantive settlements. It originated as a township in the parish of Blackburn, becoming a separate civil parish in 1866. From 1894, it formed part of the Preston Rural District, and under the Local Government Act 1972 became part of the South Ribble district in 1974.

The origin of Cuerdale is defined as "Cynferth's valley". Cynferth is a Saxon personal name.

== History ==
One of the earliest known references to the area was Warine or Swain de Keuerdale, born c. 1112 (who may be the same person as Swain De Salmesbury, Lord of Hindley) who occupied a site on or near location of present Cuerdale Hall. When Warine died, Gilbert received half of the Manor; the rest was divided between the other sons.

Cromwell's army camped in the area before the Battle of Preston in 1648.

The Cuerdale family were members of the Preston Guild through the 15th and 16th centuries. Richard Cuerdale was an alderman of the Guild.

No known members of the family now use the spelling Cuerdale. There were about 20 individuals in 1900 who used the spelling Cuerdale and another approximately 20 who used the spelling Curedale. The last known member of the family who used the spelling Cuerdale was married in Lancashire around 1943. The Curedale family who take their name from the area today consist of about 30 individuals living in Dublin, Ireland, Hertfordshire England, Western Australia and the US.

== Geography ==
Examination of satellite images showing field alignments and local roads suggest that Cuerdale Hall was on the Western side of a road coming from the south that possibly crossed the Ribble immediately north of the hall. The last mile approximately of this road does not exist today. Sections of the road exist perhaps a mile south of the hall. The alignment of the hall does not correspond to modern roads or modern alignment of the river Ribble. The hall alignment suggests that this road may have passed from Cuerdale Hall through Cuerdale Cross the location of an ancient stone cross, which could mark the position of the ancient village of Keverdale.

The remains of defensive ditches on the site of Cuerdale Hall were surveyed in the early 1990s. The hall is contained within a semi-rectangular area about 150 metres in extent formed by a deep ditch about 12 metres in width. There is a V-shaped ditch about 7 metres wide and two metres deep on the southern side of the Hall. Parallel and a little further south there is a scarp which suggests that the 7-metre ditch may have been cut from an earlier and wider ditch that silted up. The evidence suggests that a fortified enclosure existed on the site that was large for a manorial enclosure in the area. Close to a ford in the River Ribble the site is of strategic significance. The fortifications have not been dated. Some moated enclosures around halls in Lancashire served a decorative rather than protective purpose.

== Treasure ==
The Cuerdale Hoard was found in the parish.

== See also ==
- Listed buildings in Cuerdale
