= Battle of Tettenhall =

Battle during the Viking invasions of England (910 CE)

Coordinates: 52°35′00″N 2°08′00″W

- Part of the Viking invasions of England
Date	5 August 910
Location	Tettenhall, Staffordshire
Result	Anglo-Saxon victory

Belligerents
Danelaw Vikings	Mercia; Wessex

Commanders and leaders
Eowils †; Halfdan †; Ingwær †	Not known

Casualties and losses
Heavy, in the thousands	Unknown

The Battle of Tettenhall (sometimes called the Battle of Wednesfield or Wōdnesfeld) took place, according to the chronicler Æthelweard, near Tettenhall on 5 August 910. The allied forces of Mercia and Wessex met an army of Northumbrian Vikings in Mercia.

== Background ==
After successful raids by Danish Vikings, significant parts of northeastern England, formerly Northumbria, were under their control. Danish attacks into central England had been resisted and effectively reduced by Alfred the Great, to the point where his son, King Edward of Wessex, could launch offensive attacks against the foreigners. Edward was allied with the Mercians under his sister Æthelflæd, and their combined forces were formidable. The allies launched a five-week campaign against Northumbrian Danes in 909.

== Battle ==
The Vikings quickly sought retaliation for the Northern excursion. In 910, King Edward was in Kent waiting for a fleet he had summoned, and the Vikings, believing that most of the king's troops were on board ship, launched an invasion of Mercia. They raided as far as the Avon near Bristol, and then harried along the Severn until they reached the Bridgnorth area. They now moved east, followed by a joint Mercian and West Saxon army, which caught up with the Vikings near Tettenhall. The raiders were annihilated and three kings were killed: Ingwær, Eowils and Halfdan.

== Aftermath ==
With the Northern Danes subdued, the forces of Wessex and Mercia could be focused against the Vikings who had settled further south, and there was no further incursion from the north for a generation.
