= Eowils and Halfdan =

Early 10th century Danish rulers of Northumbria

Eowils and Halfdan (Healfdan) were kings in Danish-ruled Northumbria during the early tenth century.

Following the death of Alfred the Great in 899 the throne was disputed between his son Edward the Elder and Æthelwold, a son of Alfred's elder brother. Æthelwold was unable to get significant support in Wessex and fled to Northumbria, where he was accepted as king, but he was killed by Edward's men at the Battle of the Holme in 902. In the following years there seems to have been no clear leadership in Northumbria as no kings are named on coins of the period.

In 909 King Edward sent an army to ravage Northumbria, and the following year the Northumbrians retaliated by sending an army to raid across Wessex and Mercia. On the way back the army was intercepted near Tettenhall by an army of Wessex and Mercia, and suffered a heavy defeat. The Anglo-Saxon Chronicle names two kings among the Danish dead called Eowils and Halfdan. In Æthelweard's Chronicon, a Latin translation of the Anglo-Saxon Chronicle, a third king, Ingwær, is also named as killed at Tettenhall.

The defeat put an end to the threat from the Northumbrian Vikings for a generation.
