= 559 =

Calendar year

559 in various calendars
- Gregorian calendar: 559; DLIX
- Ab urbe condita: 1312
- Armenian calendar: 8 ԹՎ Ը
- Assyrian calendar: 5309
- Balinese saka calendar: 480–481
- Bengali calendar: −35 – −34
- Berber calendar: 1509
- Buddhist calendar: 1103
- Burmese calendar: −79
- Byzantine calendar: 6067–6068
- Chinese calendar: 戊寅年 (Earth Tiger); 3256 or 3049 — to — 己卯年 (Earth Rabbit); 3257 or 3050
- Coptic calendar: 275–276
- Discordian calendar: 1725
- Ethiopian calendar: 551–552
- Hebrew calendar: 4319–4320
- Hindu calendars
- Vikram Samvat: 615–616
- Shaka Samvat: 480–481
- Kali Yuga: 3659–3660
- Holocene calendar: 10559
- Iranian calendar: 63 BP – 62 BP
- Islamic calendar: 65 BH – 64 BH
- Javanese calendar: 447–448
- Julian calendar: 559; DLIX
- Korean calendar: 2892
- Minguo calendar: 1353 before ROC 民前1353年
- Nanakshahi calendar: −909
- Seleucid era: 870/871 AG
- Thai solar calendar: 1101–1102
- Tibetan calendar: ས་ཕོ་སྟག་ལོ་ (male Earth-Tiger); 685 or 304 or −468 — to — ས་མོ་ཡོས་ལོ་ (female Earth-Hare); 686 or 305 or −467

Year 559 was a common year starting on Wednesday of the Julian calendar. The denomination 559 for this year has been used since the early medieval period, when the Anno Domini calendar era became the prevalent method in Europe for naming years.

== Events ==
=== By place ===
==== Byzantine Empire ====
- Winter – The Kutrigurs and Huns under Zabergan cross the frozen Danube River, and invade the Balkans. They raid Thracia and Macedonia, but are driven back near Constantinople by a Byzantine force under Belisarius.
- Battle of Melantias: Outside the city walls of Constantinople, Belisarius defeats the combined "barbarians" with his veteran cavalry (bucellarii), and a few thousand hastily raised levies.

==== Britain ====
- Glappa succeeds his father Ida as king of Bernicia (North East England). During his rule, Anglian settlers expand their territory in what is now southeastern Scotland.

==== Asia ====
- First successful human flight: a kite carrying Yuan Huangtou lands in the proximity of Ye. Emperor Wen Xuan Di sponsors the flight; Yuan is taken prisoner; other imprisoned kite flyers also fly, but those die and Yuan survives. Yuan is executed afterwards.
- Wen Di, age 37, succeeds his uncle Chen Wu Di as emperor of the Chen dynasty. During his reign, he consolidates the state against the rebellious warlords.
- The city-state Ara Gaya, a member of the Gaya confederacy, surrenders to Silla in the Korean Peninsula.
- Pyeongwon becomes ruler of the Korean kingdom of Goguryeo.

== Births ==
- Reccared I, king of the Visigoths (d. 601)
- Wu Shihuo, father of Wu Zetian (d. 635)
- Xuan Di, emperor of Northern Zhou (d. 580)

== Deaths ==
- Chen Wu Di, emperor of the Chen dynasty (b. 503)
- Ida, king of Bernicia (approximate date)
- Leonard of Noblac, Frankish abbot and saint
- Wen Xuan Di, emperor of Northern Qi (b. 529)
