= List of Anglo-Saxon deities =

Anglo-Saxon deities are in general poorly attested, and much is inferred about the religion of the Anglo-Saxons from what is known of other Germanic peoples' religions. The written record from the period between the Anglo-Saxon invasion of the British Isles to the Christianisation of the Anglo-Saxons is very sparse, and most of what is known comes from later Christian writers such as Bede, whose descriptions can be compared to other Germanic mythologies as well as the extant archaeological evidence. The list below is incomplete, but includes brief discussion of the attestation of the deities in question, and should be considered critically.

== Major deities ==
- Woden, king of the gods and god of wisdom. Cognate to Norse Odin. Source of the word 'Wednesday'.
- Tīw, a war god and in older attestations possibly a sky god. Cognate to Norse Týr, as well as Greek Zeus, Roman Jupiter, Baltic Dievs/Dievas and Hindu Dyaus. Source of the word 'Tuesday'.
- Thunor, god of thunder and cognate to Norse Thor and source of the word 'Thursday'.
- Frig, the wife of Woden, the goddess of marriage and childbirth and source of the word 'Friday'.
- Ing, possibly another name for the Norse 'Freyr', god of fertility.

== Poorly attested deities ==
- Ēostre, listed by Bede, and purported source of the word 'Easter'.
- Erce/Folde, the 'Mother of Earth' cited in the Æcerbot charm (cf. Nerthus, Fulla, Jörð).
- Rheda, also Hrethe or Hrēða, listed by Bede.

== Putative deities inferred from other sources ==
- Wyrd, the Anglo-Saxon concept of fate.
- Beowa, a figure associated with barley and possibly conflated with Beowulf.

The following are cognate to deities known to have been worshipped by other Germanic peoples, and are also related to the sources of names of days of the week:

- Siȝel - an Old English term for 'sun', a goddess in related religions, and sister of the moon god.
- Mona - the Old English for 'moon', a god in related religions, and brother of the sun goddess. Source for the word 'Monday'.

== Putative deities mentioned in king lists ==
- Bældæġ, son of Woden, mentioned in the king-list of Bernicia, possibly identified with Baldur by Snorri.
- Seaxnēat, patron deity of the Saxons.
- Wecta, mentioned in multiple king-lists, possible cognate of Vegdeg, a son of Woden.

== Other supernatural figures ==
- Modra, the 'Mothers', whose festival 'Modraniht' is mentioned by Bede. Possibly connected to the Matres and Matronae, and the Norns.
- Nicors, water spirits attested in Beowulf with apparent cognates in other Germanic languages as well as modern dialectal knucker.
- Wælcyrge, cognate with Norse Valkyries, which may have been imported from Norse mythology.

== See also ==
- List of Germanic deities
