= Frithuwald of Bernicia =

Frithuwald

King of Bernicia
- Reign: 579–585
- Predecessor: Theodric
- Successor: Hussa

Frithuwald of Bernicia ruled, perhaps from 579 to 585. He was the sixth known ruler of the Anglo-Saxon kingdom of Bernicia.

Little is known of Frithuwald's life and reign. The earliest authorities differ widely on the order and the regnal years of the kings between the death of Ida and the beginning of Æthelfrith's rule in 592/593. Placing the listed reigns in the order given, Frithuwald would have begun to reign in 579 and Historia Brittonum says he was on the throne for six years. However, Historia Brittonum also records that he ruled when Augustine of Canterbury's mission came to Kent (597).

== Notes ==
Preceded by Theodric	Kings of Bernicia; 579–585	Succeeded by Hussa
