= Ecgberht of Northumbria =

Ecgberht of Northumbria may refer to:

- Ecgberht I of Northumbria (deposed 872; died 873)
- Ecgberht II of Northumbria (reigned 876–878×883)
