= Esa of Bernicia =

King of Bernicia

Esa also known as Oesa was a semi-historical king of Bernicia from c. 500 – c. 520.

He is mentioned in the Anglo-Saxon Chronicle for 547 as the grandfather of Ida, the first historical king of Bernicia. He was the son of Ingwi (or Ingui) and the father of Eoppa, who succeeded him as king. In some historical sources he might have been the son of Ethelbert.
