= List of monarchs of Northumbria =

Northumbria, a kingdom of Angles, in what is now northern England and southern Scotland, was initially divided into two kingdoms: Bernicia and Deira. The two were first united by King Æthelfrith around the year 604, and except for occasional periods of division over the subsequent century, they remained so. The exceptions are during the brief period from 633 to 634, when Northumbria was plunged into chaos by the death of King Edwin in battle and the ruinous invasion of Cadwallon ap Cadfan, king of Gwynedd. The unity of the Northumbrian kingdoms was restored after Cadwallon's death in battle in 634.

Another exception is a period from about the year 644 to 664, when kings ruled individually over Deira. In 651, King Oswiu had Oswine of Deira killed and replaced by Œthelwald, but Œthelwald did not prove to be a loyal sub-king, allying with the Mercian King Penda; according to Bede, Œthelwald acted as Penda's guide during the latter's invasion of Northumbria but withdrew his forces when the Mercians met the Northumbrians at the Battle of Winwaed. After the Mercian defeat at Winwaed, Œthelwald lost power and Oswiu's own son, Alchfrith, became king in his place. In 670, Ælfwine, the brother of the childless king Ecgfrith, was made king of Deira; by this point the title may have been used primarily to designate an heir. Ælfwine was killed in battle against Mercia in 679, and there was not another separate king of Deira until the time of Norse rule.

== Kings of Bernicia ==
Reign	Incumbent	Notes
c. 500	Esa (Oesa)	Doubtful historicity as a king.
c. 520	Eoppa	Doubtful historicity as a king. Son of Esa.
547 to 559	Ida	The Historia Brittonum calls Ida the first king of Bernicia. Son of Eoppa.
559[?] to 560[?]	Glappa (Clappa)	
560[?] to 568[?]	Adda	Order and dates uncertain. Son of Ida.
568[?] to 572[?]	Æthelric	Order and dates uncertain. Son of Ida.
572[?] to 579[?]	Theodric (Deoric)	Order and dates uncertain. Son of Ida
579[?] to 585[?]	Frithuwald (Frithewlf)	Order and dates uncertain.
585[?] to 592[?]	Hussa	Order and dates uncertain.
593[?] to 616	Æthelfrith	Son of Æthelric, also ruled Deira, killed in battle by Rædwald, King of East Anglia
Deira Dynasty
616 to 12/14 Oct 632	Edwin	Son of Ælla of Deira, which he also ruled, killed in battle by Penda, King of Mercia
Bernicia Dynasty
late 632 to 633	Eanfrith	Son of Æthelfrith
634 to 5 Aug 642	Oswald (Osuualde, Osƿald)	Son of Æthelfrith, also ruled Deira, killed by Penda, King of Mercia; Saint Oswald
late 642 to 654	Oswiu	Son of Æthelfrith, became king of united Northumbria

== Kings of Deira ==
Reign	Incumbent	Notes
559/560 to 589	Ælla (Aelli)	Son of Yffa
589/599 to 604	Æthelric (Aedilric)	Brother of Ælla
Bernicia Dynasty
593/604[?] to 616	Æthelfrith	Also king of Bernicia; killed in battle by Rædwald, King of East Anglia
Deira Dynasty
616 to 12/14 Oct 632	Edwin	Son of Ælla, also ruled Bernicia; killed in battle by Cadwallon of Gwynedd and Penda of Mercia; Saint Edwin
late 633 to summer 634	Osric	Son of Æthelric
Bernicia Dynasty
633 to 5 Aug 642	Oswald	Son of Æthelfrith, also ruled Bernicia, killed by Penda, King of Mercia; Saint Oswald
642 to 644	Oswiu	Son of Æthelfrith, also ruled Bernicia
Deira Dynasty
644 to 651	Oswine	Son of Osric, murdered
Bernicia Dynasty
summer 651 to late 654 or 655	Œthelwald	Son of Oswald
654 to 15 Aug 670	Oswiu	Restored
656 to 664	Alchfrith	Sub-king under his father Oswiu
664 to 670	Ecgfrith	Sub-king under his father Oswiu, upon whose death he became king of all Northumbria
670 to 679	Ælfwine	Sub-king under his brother Ecgfrith, King of Northumbria. Killed in the Battle of the Trent against King Æthelred of Mercia

== Kings of Northumbria ==
Reign	Incumbent	Notes
654 to 15 February 670	Oswiu	Previously king of Bernicia and Deira
February 670 to 20 May 685	Ecgfrith	Son of Oswiu, killed in battle against the Picts
May 685 to 14 December 704	Aldfrith (Ealdfrith, Aldfrid)	Son of Oswiu
late 704 to early 705	Eadwulf I	Usurper
705 to 716	Osred I	Son of Aldfrith, killed in battle or murdered
716 to 718	Coenred	Distant descendant of Ida of Bernicia
718 to 29 May 729	Osric	Son of Aldfrith, adopted Ceolwulf as his heir
729 to 731. Second Reign: 732 to 737/8	Ceolwulf	Brother of Coenred, deposed for brief period of 1 year, then restored. Abdicated to become a monk; Became Saint Ceolwulf
737 to 758	Eadberht	Son of Eata, a descendant of Ida of Bernicia, abdicated to become a monk
758 to 759	Oswulf (Osulf)	Son of Eadberht, murdered by his servants
759 to 765	Æthelwald Moll	Deposed
765 to 774	Alhred	Distant descendant of Ida of Bernicia, deposed and exiled
774 to 779	Æthelred I	Son of Æthelwald Moll, deposed
779 to 23 September 788	Ælfwald I	Son of Oswulf, murdered
788 to 790	Osred II	Son of Alhred, deposed and exiled
790 to 18 April 796	Æthelred I	Restored
796	Osbald	Exiled after a reign of 27 days
14 May 796 to 806/8	Eardwulf	Deposed
806/8 to 808/10	Ælfwald II (Elfwald II)	
808 to 810	Eardwulf	Restored
810 to 841	Eanred	Son of Eardwulf
840/1 to 844	Æthelred II	Son of Eanred, deposed
844	Rædwulf (Redwulf)	Usurper
844 to c. 848/9	Æthelred II	Restored
c. 848/9 to 862/3	Osberht (Osbert)	Deposed
862/3/7 to 21 March 867	Ælla	Usurper, killed by the Danes with Osberht
867 to 21 March 867	Osberht (Osbert)	Killed by the Danes with the usurper Ælla

== Rulers of the divided Northumbria ==
Viking kings ruled Jórvík (southern Northumbria, the former Deira) from its capital York for most of the period between 867 and 954. Northern Northumbria (the former Bernicia) was ruled by Anglo-Saxons from their base in Bamburgh. Many details are uncertain as the history of Northumbria in the ninth and tenth centuries is poorly recorded.

Years	Ruler of southern Northumbria	Ruler of northern Northumbria	Notes
867–872	Military conquest by the Great Heathen Army	Ecgberht I	Ecgberht I ruled north of the Tyne as a puppet king of the Danes.
872–c. 875	Ricsige		Probably ruled most of Northumbria as a sovereign Anglo-Saxon king.
c. 875–877	Halfdan Ragnarsson	Ecgberht II	The year in which Ecgberht II ceased to be king is unclear.
877–883	Interregnum in York	Ecgberht II	The year in which Ecgberht II ceased to be king is unclear.
c. 883–895	Guthred	Uncertain. Possibly Ecgberht II.	The year in which Ecgberht II ceased to be king is unclear.
c. 895–900	Siefried	Eadwulf II (Eadwulf I of Bamburgh)	1. Eadwulf II is variously titled as either a king or a reeve and the year in which he came to power is unknown. Conventionally he is thought to have ruled only the northern part of the kingdom (Bamburgh) but he may have ruled all of Northumbria.; 2. Siefried and Cnut may have been joint kings in York for part or all of the period between 895 and 905; 3. Along with Hálfdan and Eowils, another king, Ingwær, their brother, may have also ruled. All three were killed at the Battle of Tettenhall in 910.
c. 900	Airdeconut	Eadwulf II (Eadwulf I of Bamburgh)	
c. 900–905	Cnut	Eadwulf II (Eadwulf I of Bamburgh)	
c. 900–902	Æthelwold	Eadwulf II (Eadwulf I of Bamburgh)	
c. 902–910	Hálfdan and Eowils	Eadwulf II (Eadwulf I of Bamburgh)	
c. 910–913	Anglo-Saxon control, possibly under Eadwulf II	Eadwulf II (Eadwulf I of Bamburgh)	
913–c. 918	Anglo-Saxon control, possibly under Ealdred I	Ealdred I	1. There is some evidence that Ealdred submitted to Edward the Elder in 924 who died in that year.; 2. Ealdred submitted to Æthelstan in 927, making Æthelstan the overlord of all Northumbria as King of the English from 12 July 927, following the Treaty of Eamont Bridge. It is likely that Ealdred's submission was somewhat nominal with Ealdred ruling semi-independently while acknowledging West Saxon authority.
918–921	Rægnald	Ealdred I	1. There is some evidence that Ealdred submitted to Edward the Elder in 924 who died in that year.; 2. Ealdred submitted to Æthelstan in 927, making Æthelstan the overlord of all Northumbria as King of the English from 12 July 927, following the Treaty of Eamont Bridge. It is likely that Ealdred's submission was somewhat nominal with Ealdred ruling semi-independently while acknowledging West Saxon authority.
921–927	Sigtrygg	Ealdred I	1. There is some evidence that Ealdred submitted to Edward the Elder in 924 who died in that year.; 2. Ealdred submitted to Æthelstan in 927, making Æthelstan the overlord of all Northumbria as King of the English from 12 July 927, following the Treaty of Eamont Bridge. It is likely that Ealdred's submission was somewhat nominal with Ealdred ruling semi-independently while acknowledging West Saxon authority.
927	Guthfrith	Ealdred I	1. There is some evidence that Ealdred submitted to Edward the Elder in 924 who died in that year.; 2. Ealdred submitted to Æthelstan in 927, making Æthelstan the overlord of all Northumbria as King of the English from 12 July 927, following the Treaty of Eamont Bridge. It is likely that Ealdred's submission was somewhat nominal with Ealdred ruling semi-independently while acknowledging West Saxon authority.
927–c. 933	Æthelstan	Ealdred I	1. There is some evidence that Ealdred submitted to Edward the Elder in 924 who died in that year.; 2. Ealdred submitted to Æthelstan in 927, making Æthelstan the overlord of all Northumbria as King of the English from 12 July 927, following the Treaty of Eamont Bridge. It is likely that Ealdred's submission was somewhat nominal with Ealdred ruling semi-independently while acknowledging West Saxon authority.
c. 933–c. 934	Æthelstan	Adulf mcEtulfe	1. The name Adulf mcEtulfe can be taken to be Æthelwulf son of Eadwulf.; 2. Alternatively, Adulf mcEtulfe indicates Ealdred son of Eadwulf, i.e. Ealdred I.; 3. Adulf mcEtulfe died in 934 and had been named 'King of the Northern Saxons' by the Annals of Clonmacnoise.
c. 934–939	Æthelstan	Overlordship of Æthelstan	
939–941	Olaf Guthfrithson	Possibly Olaf Guthfrithson	After Æthelstan's death in 939, the men of York immediately chose the Viking king of Dublin, Olaf Guthfrithson (or his cousin, Anlaf Cuaran (Note: Historian Kevin Halloran argues that it was Anlaf Cuaran rather than Olaf Guthfrithson who became King of York after Æthelstan's death)), as their king and the Anglo-Saxon control of the north collapsed.
941–943/944	Olaf Sihtricson	Possibly Olaf Sihtricson	Olaf Sihtricson was also known as Amlaíb Cuarán
c. 942	Sitric II	Possibly Sitric II	Sitric's existence is only evidenced by coins bearing his name which were minted at York.
943–944	Ragnall Guthfrithson (possibly with Olaf Sihtricson)	Possibly Ragnall Guthfrithson with Olaf Sihtricson	
c. 944–946	Edmund of Wessex	Possibly under Eadmund's overlordship	Edmund's authority was as King of the English.
c. 947–948	Eric Bloodaxe	Osulf I under King Eadred's overlordship	1. From 946, Osulf I appears in the historical record as high-reeve of Bamburgh under Eadred the King of the English.; 2. According to some later sources Eric was Eric Bloodaxe who had previously been King of Norway.
949–952	Olaf Sihtricson	Osulf I under King Eadred's overlordship	1. Olaf Sihtricson was restored to the throne. During this time, Osulf I is variously described as the high-reeve or earl of Bamburgh.; 2. Olaf Sihtricson was also known as Amlaíb Cuarán.
952–954	Eric Bloodaxe	Osulf I under King Eadred's overlordship	Eric was restored to the throne. In 954 Osulf I was responsible for a conspiracy that led to the death of Eric in 954.

Although Eadred claimed rule from 946, the Kingdom of Northumbria was not absorbed permanently into England until after 954. Thereafter Osulf had control of all Northumbria under Eadred. See Rulers of Bamburgh for subsequent lords of Bamburgh after Osulf, none of whom ruled as kings.

After the ascension of William the Conqueror in 1066, and in the prelude to the Harrying of the North, a joint Anglo-Danish force loyal to Edgar Ætheling and Sweyn II was able to seize control of York in the second half of 1069 and temporarily assert sovereignty over all of Northumbria. This short-lived independence came to an end when William fought his way North and paid off Sweyn to return to Denmark, leading to the Harrying of the North and the flight of Edgar and his family to Scotland.

== Family tree ==
- Kings of Bernicia; - Kings of Deira; - Kings of Northumbria

Esa
Eoppa
Ida d. 559 r.c.547–559	Yffi
Glappa d. 560 r.559–560	Adda d. 568 r.560–568	Æthelric d. 572 r.568–572	Theodoric d. 579 r.572–579	Ælle d. 588 r.569–588	Frithuwald d. 585 r.579–585	Hussa d. 592 r.585–592	Æthelric r.589/599–604
Æthelfrith d. 616 r.592–616	Acha of Deira	Eadwine b.c.586; d. 633 r.616–633	Osric I d. 634 r.633–634
Eanfrith b.c.595; d. 634 r.633–634	Oswald b.c.604; d. 642 r.634–642	Oswiu b.c.612; d. 670 r.642–670	Oswine d. 651 r.644–651
Talorgan; King of the Picts	Æthelwald I d. 655 r.651–655	Ealhfriht d. 664 r.655–664	Ecgfriht b.c.645; d. 685 r.670–685	Ealdfriht d. 704 r.685–704	Ælfwine b.c.661; d. 679 r.670–679
Osred I b.c.697; d. 716 r.704–716	Osric II d. 729 r.718–729

== See also ==
- Rulers of Bamburgh
- Earl of York
- Earl of Northumbria
- Earl of Northumberland
- List of English monarchs

== Sources ==
- Mackenzie, E; Ross, M (1834). An Historical, Topographical, and Descriptive View of the County Palatine of Durham. Vol. I. Newcastle upon Tyne: Mackenzie and Dent. p. xi.
- Downham, Clare (2007), Viking Kings of Britain and Ireland: The Dynasty of Ívarr to A.D. 1014, Edinburgh: Dunedin, ISBN 978-1-903765-89-0, OCLC 163618313
- Woolf, Alex (2007), From Pictland to Alba, 789–1070, The New Edinburgh History of Scotland, Edinburgh: Edinburgh University Press, ISBN 978-0-7486-1234-5, OCLC 123113911
