= Hering son of Hussa =

Hering
- Born: Late 6th century
- Died: Early 7th century
- Father: Hussa of Bernicia

Hering, son of Hussa (late 6th century-early 7th century) was a Bernician prince. He was the son of Hussa, king of Bernicia from 585 to 592 or 593. After Hussa's death the kingdom went to Æthelfrith, Hering's cousin. During the first half of Æthelfrith's reign, Hering fled to Dál Riata, where he was given refuge by their king, Áedán mac Gabráin.

In 603, Hering led a part of a Dalriadan army to attack Bernicia, but was defeated at the Degsastan by Æthelfrith: the Anglo-Saxon Chronicle (manuscript E, year 603) mentions Hering's participation, although Bede does not. Hering's ultimate fate is unknown.
