= Hussa =

Hussa can refer to:

- Hussa Ahmad Al-Sudayri
- Fussa, Tokyo (Hussa is the Kunrei-shiki/Nihon-shiki spelling)
- Hussa of Bernicia, a sixth-century Northumbrian king
