= Battle of Degsastan =

Battle in Highland, Scotland

Date	603
Location	Possibly Dawstane in Liddesdale, Scotland
Result	Bernician victory

Belligerents
Bernicia	Dál Riata

Commanders and leaders
Æthelfrith of Bernicia	Áedán mac Gabráin

Strength
Far inferior	Far superior "an immense and mighty army" - Bede

Casualties and losses
Light	Heavy

The Battle of Degsastan was fought around 603 between king Æthelfrith of Bernicia and the Gaels under Áedán mac Gabráin, king of Dál Riada. Æthelfrith's smaller army won a decisive victory, although his brother Theodbald was killed. Very little further is known about the battle. The location of the nominal Degsastan is not known, either; Dawstane in Liddesdale, Scotland, is a possibility.

According to Bede's account in his Historia ecclesiastica gentis Anglorum (Book I, chapter 34), Æthelfrith had won many victories against the Britons and was expanding his power and territory, and this concerned Áedán, who led "an immense and mighty army" against Æthelfrith. Although Æthelfrith had the smaller army, Bede reports that almost all of Áedán's army was slain, and Áedán himself fled. After this defeat, according to Bede, the Irish kings in Britain would not make war against the English again, right up to Bede's own time (130 years later).

Áedán's army included the Bernician exile Hering, son of the former Bernician king Hussa; his participation is mentioned by the Anglo-Saxon Chronicle (manuscript E, year 603), and may indicate dynastic rivalry among the Bernicians. Áedán's army also included the Cenél nEógain prince Máel Umai mac Báetáin, who is said by Irish sources to have slain Eanfrith, brother of Æthelfrith.

Áedán survived as King of Dál Riata until 608 when he was succeeded by his youngest son Eochaid Buide. Æthelfrith died in battle in 616.
