= Eoppa =

The name Eoppa is an Anglo-Saxon given name appearing in two traditional pedigrees:

- Eoppa, father of Ida of Bernicia
- Eoppa (fl. 681), early Christian missionary to the South Saxons
- Eoppa, nephew of king Ine of Wessex and great-grandfather of Egbert of Wessex
