= Ecgberht I =

Ecgberht I may refer to:

- Ecgberht I of Kent (died 673)
- Ecgberht I of Northumbria (died 873)

== See also ==
- Ekbert I (died 1068), Margrave
