= Adda of Bernicia =

Adda

King of Bernicia
- Reign: possibly 560–568
- Predecessor: Glappa
- Successor: Æthelric
- Father: Ida of Bernicia

Adda (fl. maybe AD 560–568) was the third known ruler of the Anglo-Saxon Kingdom of Bernicia.

Adda was one of several sons born to Ida, the first ruler of Bernicia, as was his successor Æthelric.

Adda may have been the Bernician commander at the battle of Caer Greu, where the British kings Peredur and Gwrgi of Ebrauc were killed. There is some confusion here because of a conflict between sources. The Annales Cambriae state that the Battle of Caer Greu took place in 580. The evidence for Adda being the Bernician king in question is that the Welsh Triads identify that leader as Ida. Since the sources agree that Ida died in 559, it is assumed that the Triads have named Ida by mistake, and that Adda—the only son with a name similar to Ida's -- was meant. However, the Historia Brittonum states that Adda only reigned for 8 years after Ida, in which case either the Bernician leader must have been one of Adda's successors, or else one of the sources has the dates confused. It is also possible that Ælle of Deira led the Angles at Caer Greu—certainly, Ebrauc ceased to exist as a British kingdom after the battle, with Deira taking over its territory. Since, however, the surviving northern British kingdoms subsequently combined to launch a vigorous campaign directed against Bernicia rather than Deira, this suggests that Bernicia was the original combatant.

Nothing else is known for certain about Adda's life or reign. The earliest authorities differ widely on the order and the regnal years of the Bernician kings between the death of Ida and the beginning of Æthelfrith's rule in 592/593.

Preceded by Glappa	Kings of Bernicia maybe 560–568	Succeeded by Æthelric
