= Ecgberht II =

Ecgberht II may refer to:

- Ecgberht II of Kent (ruled 765–779)
- Ecgberht II of Northumbria (ruled 876–878 or after 883?)

== See also ==
- Ekbert II (c. 1060 – 1090), Count of Brunswick and Margrave of Meissen
