= Theodric of Bernicia =

Theodric

King of Bernicia
- Reign: Maybe 572–579
- Predecessor: Æthelric
- Successor: Frithuwald
- Father: Ida of Bernicia

Theodric or Ðeodric possibly ruled from 572 to 579. He was the fifth known ruler of the Anglo-Saxon kingdom of Bernicia.

Theodric was the son of Ida of Bernicia, founder of the kingdom of Bernicia, and a brother of his predecessor, Æthelric. Little is known of Theodric's life and reign although Urien, the king of Rheged, was said to have subjected Theodric and his sons to a three-day siege on the island of Lindisfarne. Theodric has been identified with an Anglian ruler nicknamed Fflamddwyn in Welsh, who, according to medieval Welsh poetry such as Gweith Argoed Llwyfain (The Battle of Argoed Llwyfain or Battle of Leeming Lane) from the Book of Taliesin, was killed in battle by Urien's son, Owain mab Urien, after he demanded hostages and Owain refused to give in.

The dates for Theodric's rule are conjecture; the earliest authorities differ widely on the order and the regnal years of the kings between the death of Ida and the beginning of Æthelfrith's rule in 592/593.

== Notes ==
Preceded by Æthelric	Kings of Bernicia; 572–579	Succeeded by Frithuwald
