= Wecta =

Mythical ancestor of Anglo-Saxon kings

Wecta (Old English: Wægdæg, Old Norse: Vegdagr) is a figure mentioned in the Anglo-Saxon Chronicle and the Historia Brittonum.

Wecta is considered mythological, though he shows up in the genealogies as a Saxon ancestor of Hengest and Horsa and the kings of Kent, as well as of Aella of Deira and his son Edwin of Northumbria.

Wecta appears in the Prologue to the Prose Edda as Vegdeg, one of Woden's sons, a mighty king who ruled East Saxony. Although Wecta is mentioned as the father of Witta and the grandfather of Wihtgils in the Anglo-Saxon Chronicle and the Historia Brittonum, the Prose Edda and the Anglian collection of Anglo-Saxon genealogies reverses the order of Witta and Wihtgils in the genealogy.

== See also ==
- Anglo-Saxon mythology
- Germanic mythology
- Godwulf
- Norse mythology
- English mythology
