= Sitric II of Northumbria =

Viking Leader

Sitric

King of Northumbria
- Reign: c. 942
- House: Uí Ímair (possibly)
- Father: Sitric Cáech (possibly)

Sitric (Old Norse: Sigtryggr) was a Viking (Note: The definition as given by Downham is used here – Vikings were "people of Scandinavian culture who were active outside of Scandinavia".) leader who may have co-ruled Viking Northumbria in the 10th century. No contemporary texts mention Sitric and his existence is only evidenced by coins bearing his name which were minted at York in c. 942.

== Biography ==
The evidence for the existence of Sitric is a handful of coins minted at York bearing the inscription SITRIC CVNVNC (King Sitric). These coins have been dated to 942 and they bear similarities to coins of Olaf Cuaran and Ragnall Guthfrithson, two kinsmen who are known to have ruled Northumbria in the 940s. Two designs of coinage are known featuring Sitric's name. The first features a small cross on both sides, and the second features a triquetra on one side and a triangular banner on the other. No mention of Sitric is made in contemporary texts. Olaf Guthfrithson ruled Northumbria from 939 until his death in 941. Downham has suggested that between Olaf's death and the arrival of Ragnall in York, perhaps in the latter part of 943, Northumbria was co-ruled by Sitric and Olaf Cuaran. In coin listings, Sitric is sometimes called "Sitric Sitricsson", and so identified as a brother of Olaf Cuarán and son of Sitric Cáech. Sitric should not be confused with a king of Dublin of the same name, mentioned in the Annals of the Four Masters in 941. According to Downham this individual "seems to be a later poetic invention rather than a historical king". Sitric has provisionally been identified with an individual of the same name who landed in Normandy in 942 and was defeated there by Louis IV of France.
