= 529 =

Calendar year

529 in various calendars
- Gregorian calendar: 529; DXXIX
- Ab urbe condita: 1282
- Assyrian calendar: 5279
- Balinese saka calendar: 450–451
- Bengali calendar: −65 – −64
- Berber calendar: 1479
- Buddhist calendar: 1073
- Burmese calendar: −109
- Byzantine calendar: 6037–6038
- Chinese calendar: 戊申年 (Earth Monkey); 3226 or 3019 — to — 己酉年 (Earth Rooster); 3227 or 3020
- Coptic calendar: 245–246
- Discordian calendar: 1695
- Ethiopian calendar: 521–522
- Hebrew calendar: 4289–4290
- Hindu calendars
- Vikram Samvat: 585–586
- Shaka Samvat: 450–451
- Kali Yuga: 3629–3630
- Holocene calendar: 10529
- Iranian calendar: 93 BP – 92 BP
- Islamic calendar: 96 BH – 95 BH
- Javanese calendar: 416–417
- Julian calendar: 529; DXXIX
- Korean calendar: 2862
- Minguo calendar: 1383 before ROC 民前1383年
- Nanakshahi calendar: −939
- Seleucid era: 840/841 AG
- Thai solar calendar: 1071–1072
- Tibetan calendar: ས་ཕོ་སྤྲེ་ལོ་ (male Earth-Monkey); 655 or 274 or −498 — to — ས་མོ་བྱ་ལོ་ (female Earth-Bird); 656 or 275 or −497

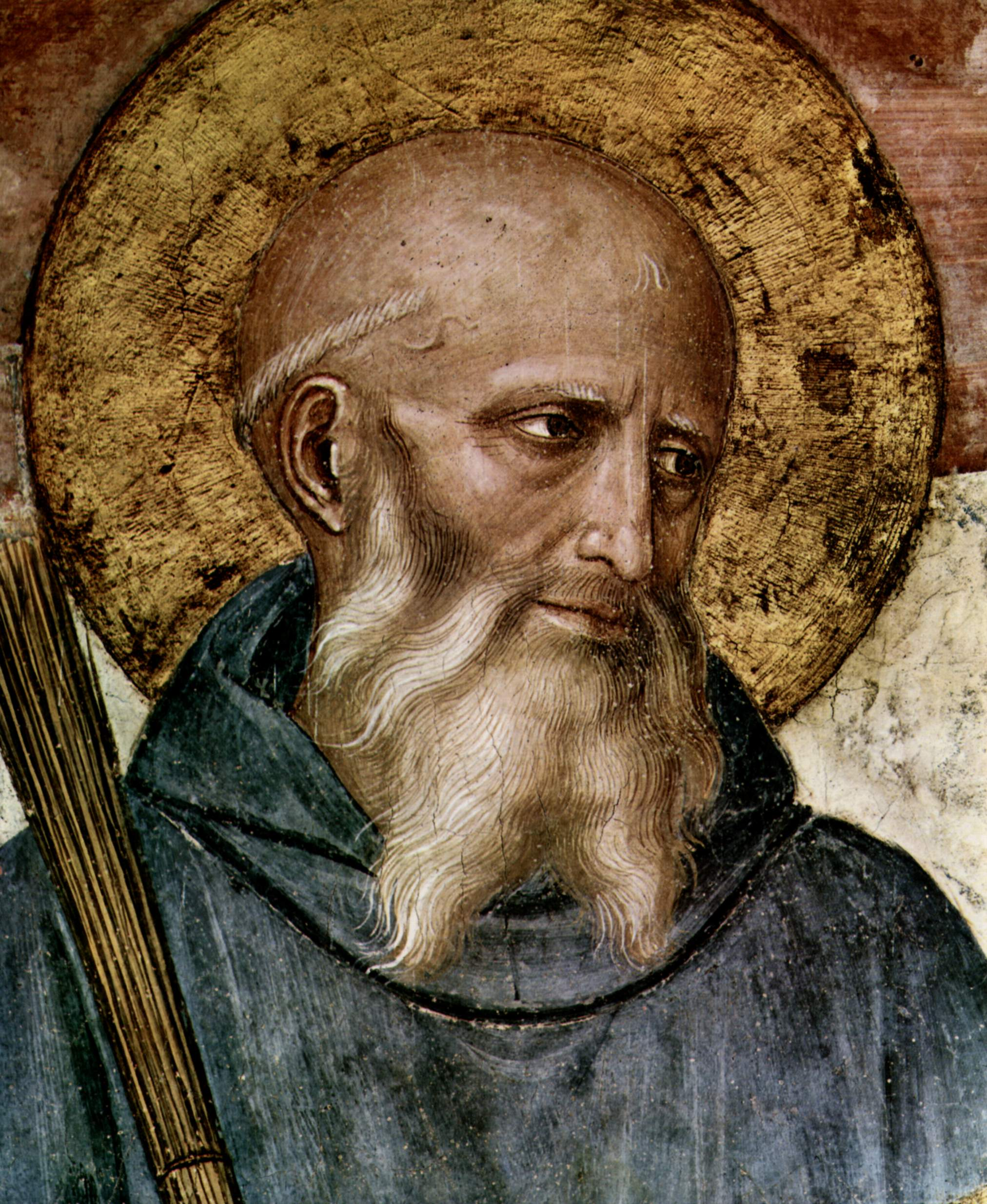
Benedict of Nursia by Fra Angelico (Florence)

Year 529 (DXXIX) was a common year starting on Monday of the Julian calendar. At the time, it was known as the Year of the Consulship of Decius without colleague (or, less frequently, year 1282 Ab urbe condita). The denomination 529 for this year has been used since the early medieval period, when the Anno Domini calendar era became the prevalent method in Europe for naming years.

== Events ==
=== By place ===
==== Byzantine Empire ====
- April 7 – Emperor Justinian I issues the Codex Justinianus (Code of Civil Laws), reformulating Roman law in an effort to control his unruly people (see 532).
- The Samaritans revolt and are defeated; the Church of the Nativity is burnt down during the Rebellion.

==== Europe ====
- Queen Amalasuntha receives a delegation sent by a council of Gothic nobles urging that she have her son Athalaric, now 13, taught an education in the Roman tradition—not by elderly schoolmasters, but by men who will teach him to "ride, fence, and to be toughened, not to be turned into a bookworm".

==== Arabia ====
- Al-Harith ibn Jabalah becomes the fifth king of the Ghassanids. He helps the Byzantines to suppress the wide-scale Samaritan Revolt.

==== Central America ====
- February 25 – Kʼan Joy Chitam I becomes the new ruler of the Mayan city-state of Palenque what is now the state of Chiapas in southern Mexico, ending an interregnum of a little over four years, and reigns until his death in 565.

==== Southeast Asia ====
- Rudravarman is granted investiture by China, as the first king of the fourth dynasty of Champa (modern Vietnam).

=== By topic ===
==== Education ====
- The Academy, originally founded at Athens by Plato around 387 BC, closes down by order of Justinian I, on charges of un-Christian activity. Many of the school's professors emigrate to Persia and Syria.

==== Religion ====
- The Benedictine Order is established at Monte Cassino near Naples by Benedict of Nursia, who founds a monastery and formulates for his monks strict rules in the "Regula Benedicti".
- The Canons of the Council of Orange are established, approving the Augustinian doctrine of sin and grace over Pelagianism and Semi-Pelagianism, but without Augustine's absolute predestination.

== Births ==
- Wen Xuan Di, emperor of Northern Qi (d. 559)

== Deaths ==
- Baderic, king of the Thuringi (b. c. 480)
- Theodosius the Cenobiarch, monk and founder of the Monastery of St. Theodosius
- Yuan Hao, imperial prince of Northern Wei
