= Hussa of Bernicia =

Hussa

King of Bernicia
- Reign: 585–593
- Predecessor: Frithuwald
- Successor: Æthelfrith

Hussa was the seventh known ruler of the Anglo-Saxon kingdom of Bernicia, ruling for seven years from about 585 to about 592.

Though his succession has led some to conclude that Hussa was another son of Ida, founder of the kingdom of Bernicia, he is not among the list of Ida's twelve sons given by Chronicon ex chronicis, and he may rather have been leader of a rival Anglian faction. Little is known of Hussa's life and reign, however. At some point during his reign, the coalition forces of Rheged and the Brythonic kingdoms of Strathclyde, Bernicia and Elmet laid siege to Hussa and were almost successful in driving the Anglian Bernician kings out of Britain. It is thought this alliance ultimately failed due to arguments between the different British tribes culminating in the murder of Urien, the king of Rheghed, around 590 by his former ally, Morcant.

Nevertheless, there is some evidence from the Anglo-Saxon Chronicle that following Hussa's death, there was a schism between his family and that of Æthelfrith, Hussa's successor, for it states that Hering son of Hussa, led Áedán mac Gabráin's forces against Æthelfrith at the Battle of Degsastan in 603.

The years of Hussa's reign are conjecture: the earliest authorities differ widely on the order and the regnal years of the kings between the death of Ida and the beginning of Æthelfrith's rule in 592/593. Historia Brittonum says that Hussa ruled for seven years, and while the dates of 585 to 592 have been estimated they are uncertain. Hussa's exact place in the Bernician genealogy is unclear.

== Notes ==
Preceded by Frithuwald	Kings of Bernicia; 585–593	Succeeded by Æthelfrith
