= Ricsige of Northumbria =

Ricsige

King of Northumbria
- Reign: 873–876 AD
- Predecessor: Ecgberht I
- Successor: Ecgberht II
- Died: 876 AD
- House: Northumbria

Ricsige (also rendered Ricsy, Ricsi or Ricsig) was King of Northumbria from 873 to 876. He became king after Ecgberht I was overthrown and fled, with Wulfhere, Archbishop of York, to Mercia.

== Career ==
In 872, Northumbria rebelled against the Great Heathen Army and their collaborators. The Northumbrians expelled Ecgberht I of Northumbria and Wulfhere of York. After the death of Ecgberht in 873, Ricsige became King of Northumbria, and restored Wulfhere as Archbishop of York.

The Anglo-Saxon Chronicle reports that the Great Heathen Army came north against the Northumbrians in 873. Halfdan Ragnarsson departed Repton in 875, bringing Northumbria under his dominion and destroying all of the monasteries. Halfdan would divide the land the following year amongst his followers, with Ricsige reportedly dying that same year from a broken heart according to the Flores Historiarum.

== Popular culture ==
In 2020, Ricsige was featured in Ubisoft's Assassin's Creed: Valhalla, installed as the King of Northumbria by Halfdan Ragnarsson after Ecgberht's deposition.

== Bibliography ==
- Symeon of Durham (1855). Joseph Stevenson (ed.). The Historical Works of Symeon of Durham. Vol. 3. Church Historian's of England.
- Roger of Hoveden (1868). William Stubbs (ed.). Chronica Magistri Rogeri de Houedene. Vol. 1. London: Longmans, Green, Reader, and Dyer. OCLC 874707654.
- The Anglo-Saxon Chronicle. Translated by Giles, John; Ingram, James. Project Gutenberg. 1 September 1996.
- Roger of Wendover (1841). Henry Coxe (ed.). Flores Historiarum. Londini, Sumptibus societatis.

Regnal titles
Preceded by Ecgberht I	King of Northumbria; 873–876	Succeeded by Ecgberht II; In Bamburgh
Preceded by Ecgberht I	King of Northumbria; 873–876	Succeeded by Halfdan Ragnarsson; In Deira (or Jórvík)
