= Ragnall Guthfrithson =

Viking leader who ruled Northumbria in the 10th century

King of Northumbria
- Reign: 943–944
- Predecessor: Olaf Cuaran
- Successor: Edmund I (as King of the English)
- Co-monarch: Olaf Cuaran
- Dynasty: Uí Ímair
- Father: Gofraid ua Ímair

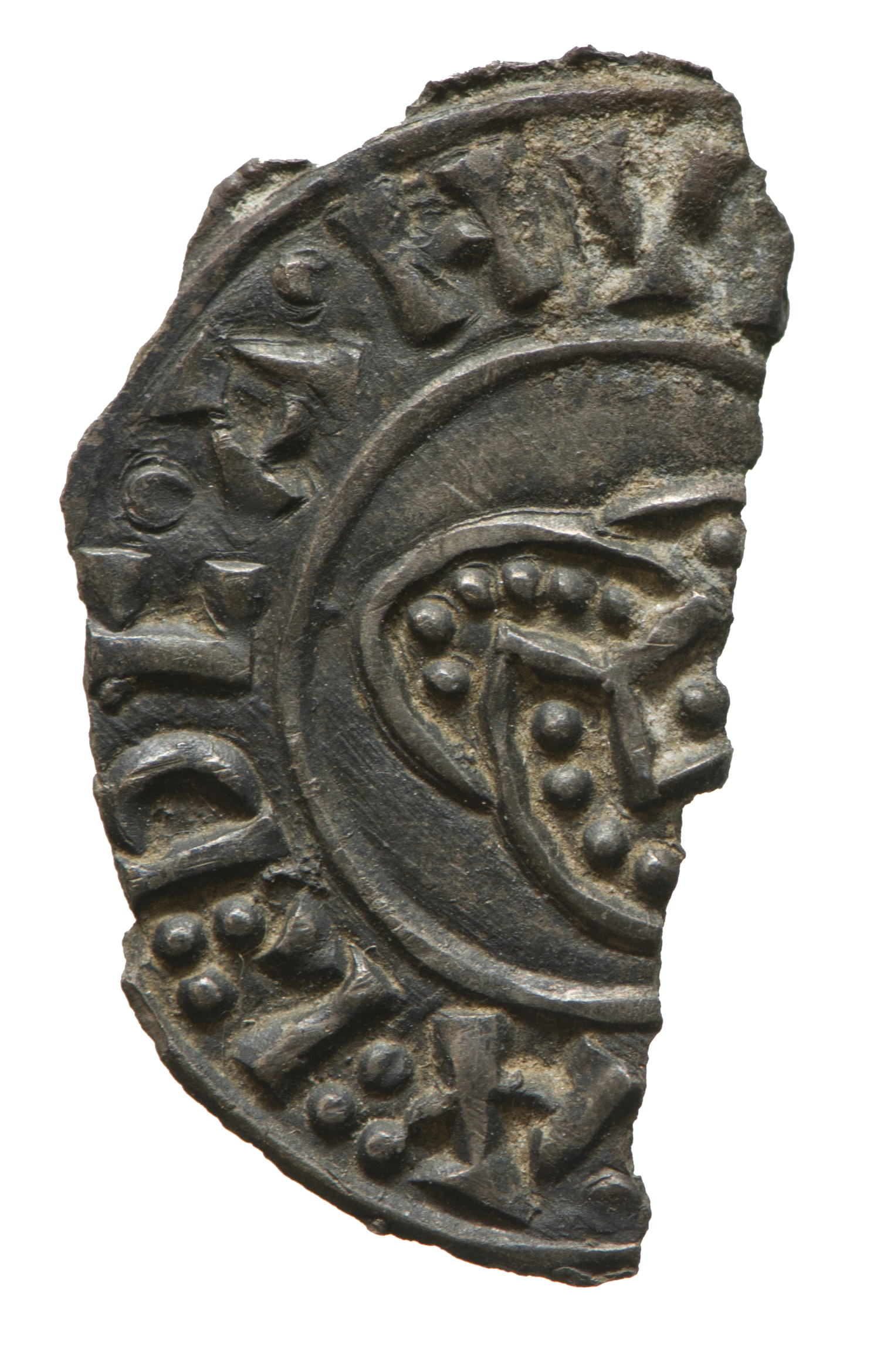
Partial, silver penny of Ragnall Guthfrithson

Ragnall Guthfrithson (Old Norse: Rǫgnvaldr Guðrøðsson [ˈrɔɣnˌwɑldz̠ ˈɡuðˌrøðsˌson]; Old Irish: Ragnall mac Gofraid) was a Viking (Note: The definition as given by Downham is used here – Vikings were "people of Scandinavian culture who were active outside of Scandinavia".) leader who ruled Viking Yorkshire in the 10th century. He was the son of Gofraid ua Ímair and great-grandson of Ímar, making him one of the Uí Ímair. He ruled Northumbria in 943 and 944, either with, or in opposition to, Olaf Cuaran. Ragnall and Olaf were driven out of Northumbria by the English in 944. His later life is unknown but it is possible he was the "king of the Danes" who is reported as being killed by the Saxons at York in 944 or 945.

== Biography ==
Ragnall first appears in the historical record in 943. The Anglo-Saxon Chronicle says that that year, Olaf Cuaran was baptised, with Edmund I, King of the English as sponsor, and that same year "after a fairly big interval" Ragnall was confirmed with Edmund as sponsor. Both Olaf and Ragnall are called king, but it is uncertain whether they were co-rulers or rival kings. Alex Woolf has suggested that the rivalry between Olaf and Ragnall may have been encouraged by Edmund for his own benefit. There exists coinage featuring the name of Ragnall and coinage featuring the name of Olaf, suggesting both ruled at York for a time. (Note: Most Northumbrian coinage of this period (939–954) was minted at York.) There also exists coinage featuring the name of an otherwise unknown Sitric, who may have co-rule Northumbria with Olaf before Ragnall arrived. If Ragnall arrived in late 943 this may explain why the confirmation ceremony with Edmund was arranged.

Symeon of Durham's Historia Regum records that in 943 Olaf Cuaran was driven out of Northumbria by the Northumbrians. However, all texts of the Anglo-Saxon Chronicle state that both Olaf and Ragnall were driven out in 944 by King Edmund. A possible explanation for this discrepancy is that Olaf was only driven out of York in 943, and continued to contest Ragnall for Northumbria until the following year. An account by the chronicler Æthelweard relates that it was Wulfstan, Archbishop of York and an unnamed ealdorman of Mercia who drove out Ragnall and Olaf and forced them to submit to Edmund. Ragnall's life after 944 is not known with any certainty, although the Annals of Clonmacnoise report in 944 or 945 that "the king of the Danes was killed by the Saxons at York". This individual might be Ragnall but the account gives no name.

== Family ==
Ragnall's father is identifiable as Gofraid, who was king of Dublin between 921 and 934, and also briefly ruled Northumbria in 927. In the annals Gofraid is identified by the use of "ua Ímair", meaning "grandson of Ímar", but never with a patronymic. As such, it is not possible to identify which of the three known sons of Ímar (Bárid, Sichfrith or Sitriuc) – if any – was the father of Gofraid. Ímar, possibly identical to Ivar the Boneless, was the founder of the Uí Ímair and was one of the earliest kings of Dublin in the mid-ninth century. Three other individuals are identifiable as sons of Gofraid. Albann was killed in battle against Muirchertach mac Néill in 926. Amlaíb, King of Dublin and Northumbria, was another son, as was Blácaire, King of Dublin from 940–945, and again from 947-948.

An individual identified as Mac Ragnaill (son of Ragnall) by the annals may have been Ragnall's son, though no name is given. In 942 Mac Ragnaill led a raid on Downpatrick, but within a week he was killed by Matudán, Overking of Ulster. The Annals of the Four Masters call Mac Ragnaill a jarl, but the Annals of Ulster call him a king. The Annals of the Four Masters also suggests he and his fellow plunderers came from an island.

=== Family tree ===
Family tree of the Uí Ímair

Ímar
Bárid | Sichfrith | Sitriuc | Unknown (Note: The parentage of Ímar's grandsons is unknown)
Uathmarán | Sitric Cáech | Ímar | Ragnall | Amlaíb | Gofraid
Sichfrith | Aralt | Sichfrith | Auisle | Gofraid | Amlaíb Cuarán | Mac Ragnaill | Ragnall | Blácaire | Amlaíb | Albann
Gofraid | Maccus | Ragnall | Glúniarran | Sitric Silkbeard | Aralt | Dubgall | Máel Muire | Ímar | Cammán | Gofraid
