= Glappa of Bernicia =

Glappa

King of Bernicia
- Reign: 559–560
- Predecessor: Ida
- Successor: Adda

Glappa of Bernicia ruled from 559 to 560. He is the second known king of Bernicia.

Little is known of Glappa's life and reign. The earliest authorities differ widely on the order and the regnal years of the kings between the death of Ida (559) and the beginning of Æthelfrith's rule (592/593). Glappa is not named among the sons given his predecessor, Ida, but appears in regnal lists as Ida's successor, reigning one year.

John Foxe's 16th century book, Actes and Monuments of these Latter and Perillous Days, Touching Matters of the Church (popularly known as Foxe's Book of Martyrs), mentions Glappa or Claspa as a king of Bernicia.

Preceded by Ida	King of Bernicia; 559–560	Succeeded by Adda
