= Ecgberht II of Northumbria =

Ecgberht

King of Northumbria
- Reign: 876 AD – c. 895
- Predecessor: Ricsige
- Successor: Guthred as King of Northumbria; Eadulf I as Ruler of Bamburgh
- House: Northumbria

Ecgberht was a king in Northumbria in the late Ninth Century. Very little is known of his reign.

Unlike his predecessor King Ricsige, who may have ruled most of the kingdom of Northumbria following the expulsion of the first King Ecgberht in 872, this Ecgberht ruled only the northern part of Northumbria, the lands beyond the Tyne in northern England and southern Scotland. The northern frontier of Ecgberht's kingdom is uncertain.

Ricsige's death and Ecgberht's coming to power is recorded by Symeon of Durham, who writes, that in 876:

The pagan king Halfdene divided between himself and his followers the country of the Northumbrians. Ricsig, king of the Northumbrians, died, and Egbert the second reigned over the Northumbrians beyond the river Tyne.

In 883, recording the election of a king of the Vikings in York and southern Northumbria on the death of their leader Halfdene (Halfdan Ragnarsson), Symeon states:

Then St. Cuthbert, aiding by a vision, ordered abbot Eadred (who because he lived in Luel was surnamed Lulisc) to tell the bishop and the whole army of Angles and Danes, that by paying a ransom, they should redeem Guthred, the son of Hardicnut, whom the Danes had sold as a slave to a certain widow at Whittingham, and should raise him, then redeemed, to be king; and he reigned over York, but Egbert over the Northumbrians.

However, elsewhere it said that the second Ecgberht reigned two years, but this may refer to his claims to all Northumbria. Nick Higham sees Symeon's account of Guthred's election as an unhistorical record of a settlement between the York Vikings in southern Northumbria, and Ecgberht in northern, English Northumbria.

Ecgberht was succeeded by Eadulf of Bernicia.

== Notes ==
Regnal titles
Preceded by Ricsige	King of Northumbria; 876–878 or after 883?	Succeeded by Guthred as King of Northumbria; Eadulf I as Ruler of Bamburgh
