= Æthelric of Bernicia =

King of Bernicia from 568 to 572

Æthelric

King of Bernicia
- Reign: 568–572
- Predecessor: Adda
- Successor: Theodric
- Issue: Æthelfrith of Northumbria
- Father: Ida of Bernicia

Aethelric or Æþelric was the fourth-known king of the Kingdom of Bernicia which he ruled from 568 to 572.

Aethelric was one of the sons of Ida of Bernicia, founder of the kingdom. During his reign the Bernicians met the Britons in three important battles, the first on the offensive, the others on the defensive.

He was the father of Æthelfrith, who was the first monarch to rule both Bernicia and Deira, the two constituent parts of what came to be considered Northumbria.

== Notes ==
Preceded by Adda	Kings of Bernicia; 568–572	Succeeded by Theodric
