= Æthelfrith =

Bernician king (died c.616)

- Reign: 593 AD–616 AD
- Died: 616 AD; River Idle, England
- Spouse: Acha of Deira
- Issue Detail: Eanfrith of Bernicia; Oswald of Northumbria; Oswiu of Northumbria; Oswudu of Northumbria; Oslac of Northumbria; Oslaf of Northumbria; Offa of Northumbria; Æbba of Northumbria
- Father: Æthelric
- Religion: Anglo-Saxon paganism

The main Anglo-Saxon Kingdoms in the 7th century.

Æthelfrith (died c. 616) was King of Bernicia from c. 593 until his death around 616 AD at the Battle of the River Idle. He became the first Bernician king to also rule the neighbouring land of Deira, giving him an important place in the development and the unification of the later kingdom of Northumbria. Reigning from the late 6th century until his death, he was known for his military campaigns against the Britons and his victory over the Gaels of Dál Riata. His most famous victory came at the Battle of Chester, where he decisively defeated a coalition of British forces, significantly weakening the influence of the native Britons in northern England. Æthelfrith's rule marked a turning point in the consolidation of Northumbria as a dominant force in early medieval Britain. He was killed in battle against a coalition led by Rædwald of East Anglia, who placed Edwin, the exiled heir of Deira, on the throne. His line was eventually restored to power in the 630s.

== Background ==
Æthelfrith, son of Æthelric and grandson of Ida, apparently succeeded Hussa as king of the Bernicians around the year 592 or 593, with his capital in Bamburgh; Æthelfrith's accession may have involved dynastic rivalry and the exile of Hussa's relatives. The genealogies attached to some manuscripts of the Historia Brittonum say that Æthelfrith ruled Bernicia for twelve years and ruled Deira for another twelve years, which can be taken to mean that he ruled in Bernicia alone from about 592 to 604, at which point he also came to the throne of Deira. His predecessors are obscure; Æthelfrith is the earliest Bernician ruler about whom any significant details are known. The 20th-century historian Frank Stenton wrote that "the continuous history of Northumbria, and indeed of England, begins with the reign of Æthelfrith", and that "he was the real founder of the historic Northumbrian kingdom, and he was remembered as the first great leader who had arisen among the northern Angles."

== Conquests ==
Bede tells of Æthelfrith's great successes over the Britons, while also noting his paganism (the conversion of Northumbria did not begin until a decade after his death): he "ravaged the Britons more than all the great men of the English, insomuch that he might be compared to Saul, once king of the Israelites, excepting only this, that he was ignorant of the true religion. For he conquered more territories from the Britons, either making them tributary, or driving the inhabitants clean out, and planting English in their places, than any other king or tribune." It may have been Æthelfrith who destroyed the British army at the Battle of Catraeth (Catterick, c. 600); the battle is described in the early poem Y Gododdin. The Britons called him Flesaur, or "the twister". It was under Æthelfrith that Bernicia's boundaries pushed significantly inland from the coast, and penetrated further into British territory.

Áedán mac Gabráin, the king of Dál Riata (to the northwest of Bernicia), was alarmed by Æthelfrith's successes, and in 603 he led "an immense and mighty army" against him. Although Æthelfrith commanded an inferior force, according to Bede, he won a crushing victory at a place called Degsastan; most of Áedán's army was killed, and Áedán himself fled. Bede says that Æthelfrith's victory was so great that the Irish kings in Britain would not make war on the English again, right up to Bede's own time. The battle appears to have been costly for Æthelfrith as well, however; Bede says that Æthelfrith's brother Theodbald was killed, "with almost all the forces he commanded". The appearance of Hering, son of Hussa, Æthelfrith's predecessor, on the side of the invaders seems to indicate dynastic rivalry among the Bernicians. Æthelfrith may have come to terms with the rulers of Dál Riata after this, judging from the fact that his subsequent known military campaigns took place in other parts of Britain; that his sons were later able to take refuge in Dál Riata after Æthelfrith's own death in battle may be significant.

Æthelfrith gained control of Deira around 604; the circumstances of this are unknown. That he gained Deira through conquest is suggested by the exile of Edwin, son of the former king Ælla, and Hereric, Edwin's nephew, who were both notable members of the Deiran royal line; the short five-year reign of Æthelric of Deira, who ruled immediately prior to Æthelfrith's acquisition of Deira, may also indicate conquest. On the other hand, D. P. Kirby suggested that Æthelfrith's rule of both kingdoms may have represented "a formalization of an existing relationship" of cooperation between the two. Kirby also pointed out that Edwin did not necessarily go into exile immediately, and considered it likely that Æthelfrith's hostility towards him "manifested itself only by degrees". Edwin, apparently seeking safety from Æthelfrith, seems to have travelled between many different kingdoms during his period of exile. He may have spent time during his exile in the British kingdom of Gwynedd, and it seems clear that he spent time in Mercia, because he married a daughter of king Cearl. Ultimately, he took refuge in East Anglia, where his presence precipitated the events that caused Æthelfrith's downfall.

It was also around 604 that Æthelfrith's son Oswald was born. Oswald's mother was Acha of Deira, daughter of Ælla, and thus Edwin's sister. Although Bede does not explicitly say Æthelfrith married Acha, it is thought that he did so; he may have married her prior to taking power in Deira, in which case the marriage may have facilitated it, or he may have done so afterwards in order to consolidate his position there.

The Historia Brittonum says that Æthelfrith gave the town of Din Guaire to his wife Bebba, after whom it was named Bamburgh; Bede also says that Bamburgh was named after a former queen named Bebba, although he does not mention Æthelfrith. It has been suggested that she "was probably Æthelfrith's first and most important wife".

Later in his reign, probably between 613 and 616, Æthelfrith attacked the Kingdom of Powys and defeated its army in the Battle of Chester, in which the Powysian king Selyf Sarffgadau was killed, along with another king called Cetula, who was probably Cadwal Crysban of Rhôs. He also massacred the monks of Bangor-Is-Coed who were assembled to aid the Britons by their prayers. Bede says that he decided to attack them because, although they were not armed, they were opposing him through their prayers. The number of dead monks was said to be about 1200, with only fifty escaping. It has been suggested that Æthelfrith may have done this for tactical reasons, to catch the Britons by surprise and force them to change their plans in order to protect the monks. After first killing the monks, Æthelfrith prevailed over the enemy army, although Bede notes that Æthelfrith's own forces suffered considerable loss. Æthelfrith's victory at Chester has been seen as having great strategic importance, as it may have resulted in the separation of the Britons between those in Wales and those to the north; however, Stenton noted that Bede was mainly concerned with the massacre of the monks and does not indicate that he regarded the battle as a historical "turning-point". John T. Koch says that the older view that the battle cut the two British areas off from each other is now "generally understood" to be outdated, as Æthelfrith died soon after, and there is "almost no archaeological evidence for Anglo-Saxon settlement within the pagan period in Cheshire or Lancashire", and in any case the sea would have been the primary means of communication.

== Rivals ==
The Deiran exile Hereric was poisoned while at the court of Ceretic, king of Elmet; Æthelfrith may have been responsible for this killing. Edwin ended up in East Anglia, under the protection of its king, Rædwald. Æthelfrith sent messengers to bribe Rædwald with "a great sum of money" into killing Edwin; Bede reports that his first message had no effect, but Æthelfrith sent more messengers and threatened war if Rædwald did not comply (bribes and threats of this kind may have previously been used to accomplish Hereric's killing). Rædwald eventually agreed to kill Edwin or hand him over to Æthelfrith's messengers, but was reportedly dissuaded from this by his wife, who said that such a thing was unworthy of his honour.

Instead, Rædwald raised an army and marched against Æthelfrith, and around 616 Æthelfrith was defeated and killed at the Battle of the River Idle (on the east side of the River Idle) by an army under Rædwald; Bede says that Æthelfrith had the inferior army, because Rædwald had not given him time to bring all his forces together. While presented by Bede as being fought simply over the issue of Edwin, this war may have actually involved questions of power and territory between the two rulers. Following Æthelfrith's death, Edwin became king not just of Deira but of Bernicia as well; Æthelfrith's sons Eanfrith, Oswald, and Oswiu fled to the north. Thus Æthelfrith's death in battle has been seen as causing "a near total revolution in the politics of what is now northern England". After Edwin was killed in 633 at the Battle of Hatfield Chase, Eanfrith temporarily regained power in Bernicia, and subsequently Oswald restored the Bernician line of Æthelfrith to power in both Bernicia and Deira. After this point, Æthelfrith's descendants continued to rule until the first part of the eighth century.

== Family ==
Æthelfrith, according to the 9th-century Anglo-Saxon genealogies (of doubtful historicity) was the son of Æthelric and grandson of Ida.

Æthelfrith married Acha of Deira, daughter of Ælla of Deira. They had eight children:

- Eanfrith of Bernicia (590–634)
- Oswald of Northumbria (c. 604 – 5 August 642)
- Oswiu of Northumbria (c. 612 – 15 February 670)
- Oswudu of Northumbria
- Oslac of Northumbria
- Oslaf of Northumbria
- Offa of Northumbria
- Æbba of Northumbria

== Sources ==
- Grundy, John (2022). History of Northumberland. Newcastle upon Tyne: Tyne Bridge Publishing. ISBN 9781838280970.
