= Ecgberht I of Northumbria =

Ecgberht

King of Northumbria
- Reign: 867–872 AD
- Predecessor: Ælla
- Successor: Ricsige
- Died: 873
- House: Northumbria

Ecgberht (died 873) was king of Northumbria in the middle of the 9th century. This period of Northumbrian history is poorly recorded, and very little is known of Ecgberht.

He first appears following the death of kings Ælla and Osberht in battle against the Vikings of the Great Heathen Army at York on 21 March 867. Symeon of Durham records, as extracts from William of Malmesbury:

Nearly all the Northumbrians were routed and destroyed, the two kings being slain; the survivors made peace with the pagans. After these events, the pagans appointed Egbert king under their own dominion; Egbert reigned for six years, over the Northumbrians beyond the Tyne.

Historians presume that Ecgberht ruled as the Great Army's tax collector and that he belonged to one of the several competing royal families in Northumbria.

The next report of Ecgberht is in 872: "The Northumbrians expelled their king Egbert, and their Archbishop Wulfhere". Finally, Ecgberht's death is reported in 873, and it is said that Ricsige succeeded him.

== Notes ==
Regnal titles
Preceded by Ælle (with Osberht ?)	King of Northumbria (north of the Tyne); Puppet of the Great Heathen Army; 867–872	Succeeded by Ricsige
