= Bernicia =

Early medieval Anglo-Saxon kingdom in northeast England (6th century – 654)

Kingdom of Bernicia Beornice (Old English)
- 6th century–604
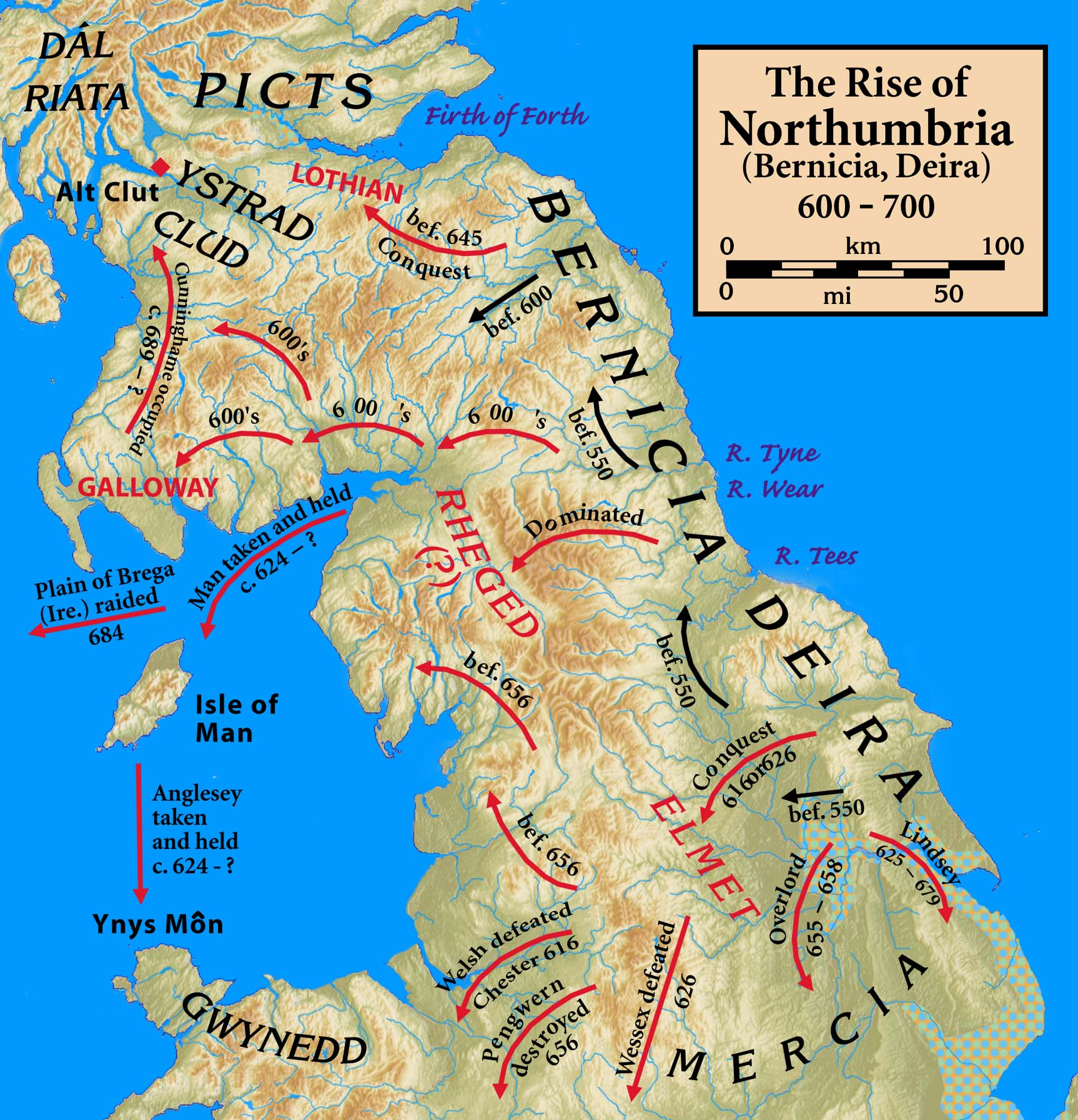
- Capital: Bamburgh
- Official languages: Northumbrian Old English
- Minority languages: Brythonic Celtic
- Religion: Paganism
- Government: Monarchy
- Historical era: Early Medieval
  - Established: 6th century
  - Shared crown with Deira: 604
  - merged with Deira: 604
Preceded by
Sub-Roman Britain
Votadini
Hen Ogledd
Succeeded by
Northumbria
- Today part of: United Kingdom England; Scotland

Bernicia (Old English: Bernica rice, Beornica rice) was a kingdom in Britain established by Anglian settlers of the 6th century in what is now southeastern Scotland and North East England.

The Anglian territory of Bernicia was approximately equivalent to the modern English counties of Northumberland, Tyne and Wear, and Durham, as well as the Scottish counties of Berwickshire and East Lothian, stretching from the Forth to the Tees. In 604 AD, it merged with its southern neighbour, Deira, to form the kingdom of Northumbria, and its borders subsequently expanded considerably.

== Etymologies ==
The Old English name Beornice is the tribal name, translated as 'Bernicians'. The name of the kingdom, Beornica rice, means 'Realm of the Bernicians'.

Bernicia occurs in Old Welsh poetry as Bryneich or Byrneich and in the 9th-century Historia Brittonum, (§ 61) as Berneich, Birneich, Bernech and Birnech. Academics agree the name was originally Celtic. This name was then adopted by the Anglian settlers who rendered it in Old English as Bernice (Northumbrian dialect) or Beornice (West Saxon dialect). The counter hypothesis suggesting these names represent a Brythonic adaption of an earlier English form is considered less probable.

Local linguistic evidence suggests continued political activity in the area from the time of the Roman retreat from Britain and before the arrival of the Angles. Important Anglian centres in Bernicia bear names of British origin, or are known by British names elsewhere: Bamburgh is called Din Guaire in the Historia Brittonum; Dunbar (where Saint Wilfrid was once imprisoned) represents Dinbaer; and the name of Coldingham is given by Bede as Coludi urbs ("town of Colud"), where Colud seems to represent the British form, possibly for the hill-fort of St Abb's Head.

Analysis of a potential derivation has not produced a consensus. The most commonly cited etymology gives the meaning as "Land of the Mountain Passes" or "Land of the Gaps" (tentatively proposed by Kenneth H. Jackson), involving a cognate of modern Scottish Gaelic beàrn ("notch, gap"). An earlier derivation from the tribal name of the Brigantes has been dismissed as linguistically unsound. In 1997 John T. Koch suggested the conflation of a probable primary form *Bernech with the native form *Brïγent for the old civitas Brigantum as a result of Anglian expansion in that territory during the 7th century.

== Political history and memory ==
The Brythonic kingdom of the area was formed from what had once been the southern lands of the Votadini, possibly as part of the division of a supposed 'great northern realm' of Coel Hen in c. 420. This northern realm is referred to by Welsh scholars as Yr Hen Ogledd or, literally, "The Old North". The kingdom may have been ruled from the site that later became the English Bamburgh, which certainly features in Welsh sources as Din Guardi. Near this high-status residence lay the island of Lindisfarne (formerly known, in Welsh, as Ynys Medcaut), which became the seat of the Bernician bishops. It is unknown when the Angles finally conquered the whole region, but around 604 is likely.

== Kings of British Bryneich ==
There are several Old Welsh pedigrees of princely "Men of the North" (Gwŷr y Gogledd) that may represent the kings of the British kingdom in the area, which may have been called Bryneich. John Morris surmised that the line of a certain Morcant Bulc referred to these monarchs, chiefly because he identified this man as the murderer of Urien Rheged who was, at the time, besieging Lindisfarne.

== Anglian Bernicia ==
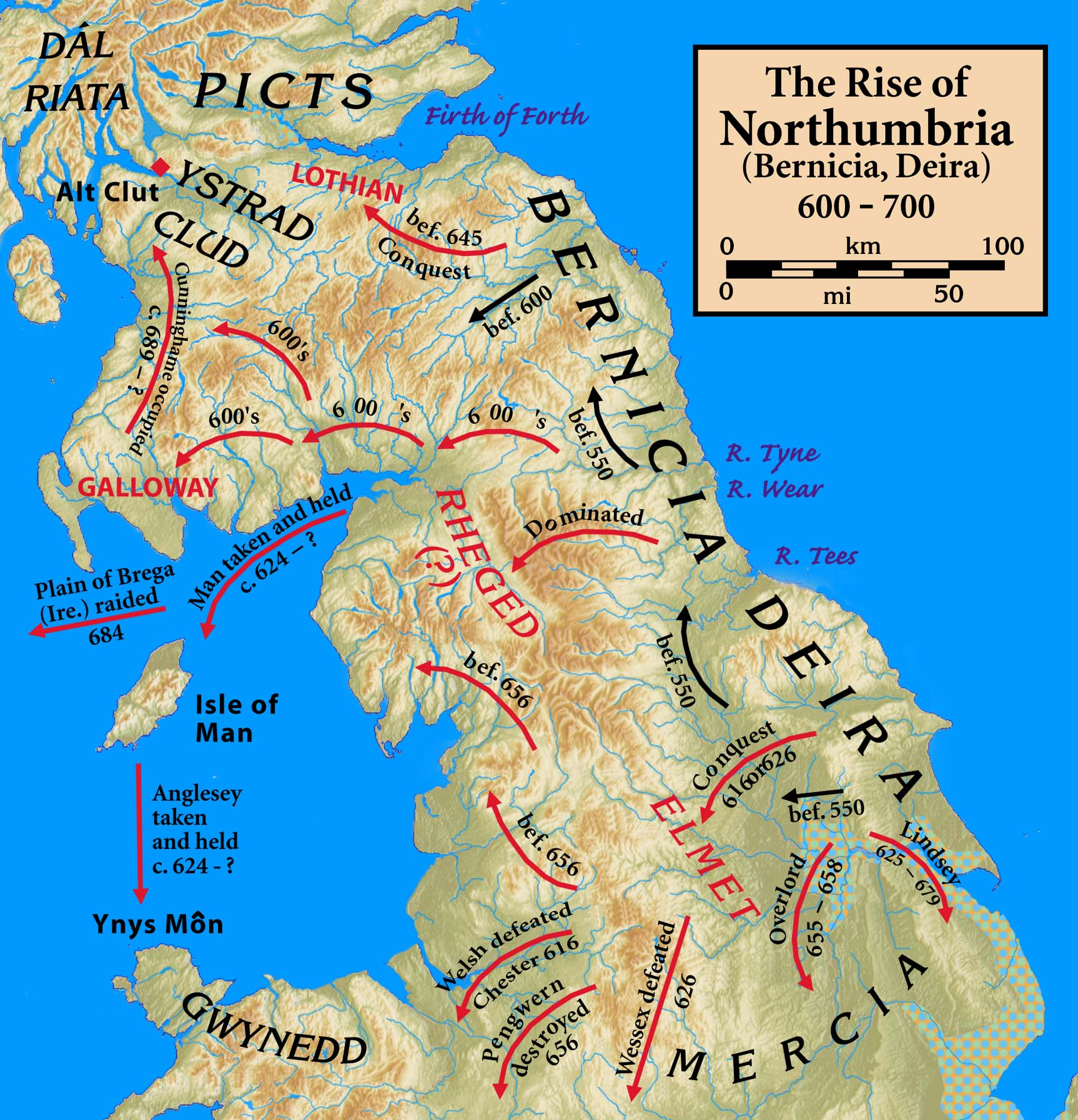

Some of the Angles of Bernicia (Old English: Beornice) may have been employed as mercenaries along Hadrian's Wall during the late Roman period. Others are thought to have migrated north (by sea) from Deira in the early 6th century. The first Anglian king in the historical record is Ida, who is said to have obtained the throne and the kingdom about 547. His sons spent many years fighting a united force from the surrounding Brythonic kingdoms until their alliance collapsed into civil war.

=== Unification of Northumbria ===
Ida's grandson, Æthelfrith, king of Bernicia, conquered Deira around 604. He ruled the two kingdoms as king of Northumbria until he was defeated and killed by Rædwald of East Anglia (who had given refuge to Edwin, son of Ælle, king of Deira) around 616. Edwin then became king. The early part of Edwin's reign was possibly spent fighting enemies from the Brythonic exiles of the old British kingdom, operating out of Gododdin. After this, it is said that on Easter Day 627 Edwin converted to Christianity in return for Elmet (a Celtic-speaking kingdom that once existed in the modern-day West Riding of Yorkshire, near Leeds), joining the kingdom of Northumbria; which drew him into direct conflict with Wales proper.

Following the disastrous Battle of Hatfield Chase on 12 October 633, in which Edwin was defeated and killed by Cadwallon ap Cadfan of Gwynedd and Penda of Mercia, Northumbria was divided again into Bernicia and Deira. Bernicia was then briefly ruled by Eanfrith, son of Æthelfrith, but after about a year he went to Cadwallon to sue for peace and was killed. Eanfrith's brother Oswald then raised an army and finally defeated Cadwallon at the Battle of Heavenfield in 634.

After this victory, Oswald appears to have been recognised by both Bernicians and Deirans as king of Northumbria. The kings of Bernicia were thereafter supreme in that kingdom, although Deira had its own sub-kings at times during the reigns of Oswiu and his son Ecgfrith.

=== Rump of Northumbria ===
England in 878. The independent rump of the former Kingdom of Northumbria (yellow) was to the north of the Norse Danelaw and Kingdom of Jórvík

After the decisive defeat of Northumbrian forces by the Viking Great Heathen Army, at the Battle of York in 867, the united Kingdom of Northumbria disintegrated. The lands north of the Tyne remained a de facto independent kingdom called Bamburgh after the stronghold of its high-reeves. The lands between Tyne and Tees were granted to the Community of St. Cuthbert, forming an ecclesiastical buffer zone between Jórvík and Bamburgh. In 927 Ealdred accepted West Saxon overlordship; however, the lands north of the Tees remained outside of the West Saxon administrative system of shires and hundreds until after the Norman invasion.

In 973, Scots sovereignty over northern Bernicia, now known as Lothian, was acknowledged by Edgar, King of England.

=== Kings of Bernicia ===
(see also List of monarchs of Northumbria)

- Ida, son of Eoppa (547–559)
- Glappa, possibly Ida's brother (559–560)
- Adda, son of Ida (560–568)
- Æthelric, son of Ida (568–572)
- Theodric, son of Ida (572–579)
- Frithuwald, possibly Adda's son (579–585)
- Hussa, possibly Adda's son (585–593)
- Æthelfrith, son of Æthelric (593–616)

Under Deiran rule 616–633)

- Eanfrith of Bernicia, son of Æthelfrith (633–634)

Under Oswald son of Æthelfrith, Bernicia was united with Deira to form Northumbria from 634 onward until the Viking invasion of the 9th Century.
