= Ida of Bernicia =

King of Bernicia (died c. 559)

Ida
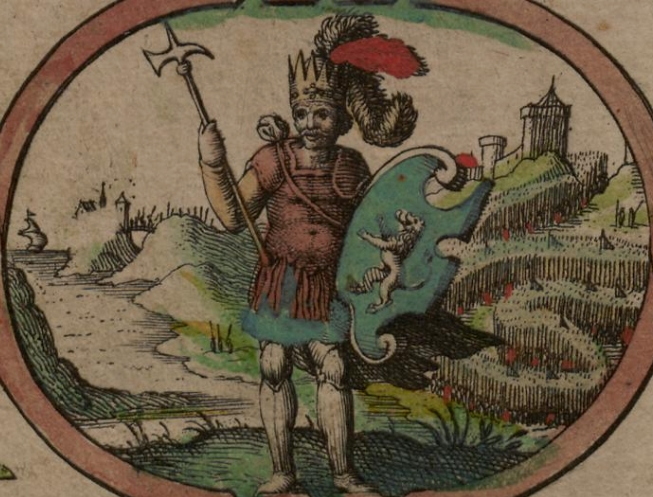
- Imaginary depiction of Ida from John Speed's 1611 "Saxon Heptarchy"

King of Bernicia
- Reign: c. 547–559
- Successor: Glappa
- Died: c. 559
- Spouse: Bearnoch
- Issue: Adda, Æthelric, Theodric, Eadric/Bealric, Theodhere, Osmere, Ocga, Alric, Ecca, Oswald, Sogor, Sogothere.
- Father: Eoppa of Bernicia

Ida (/ˈaɪdə/; died c. 559) is the first known king of the Anglian kingdom of Bernicia, which he ruled from around 547 until his death in 559. Little is known of his life or reign, but he was regarded as the founder of a line from which later Angle kings in this part of central Great Britain claimed descent. His descendants overcame Brittonic resistance and ultimately founded the powerful kingdom of Northumbria.

== Sources ==
The Anglo-Saxon Chronicle indicates that Ida's reign began in 547, and records him as the son of Eoppa, grandson of Esa, and great-grandson of Ingwy. Likewise, the Historia Brittonum calls him as the son of Eoppa and the first king of Berneich or Bernicia. The Anglo-Saxon Chronicle elaborates that he ruled for twelve years and built the Bernician capital of Bamburgh Castle. Later, however, the Chronicle confuses his territory with the later Northumbria, saying that Ælla, historically a king of Deira rather than Bernicia, succeeded him as king after his death. Northumbria did not exist until the union of Bernicia with the kingdom of Deira; this happened for the first time under Ida's grandson Æthelfrith. The genealogies of the Anglo-Saxon kings attached to some manuscripts of the Historia Brittonum give more information on Ida and his family; the text names Ida's "one queen" as Bearnoch and indicates that he had twelve sons, naming among them Adda, Æthelric, Theodric, Eadric, Theodhere, Osmere and Ealric. Several of these are listed as kings. One of them, Theodric, is noted for fighting against a Brittonic coalition led by Urien Rheged and his sons. The genealogical preface to Chronicon ex chronicis names six sons, Adda, Bealric, Theodric, Ethelric, Osmere, and Theodhere, born to his wife and six born to concubines, Ocga, Alric, Ecca, Oswald, Sogor and Sogothere. Ida's successor, Glappa, does not appear among his sons in any of the early sources. Ida's descendants would rule Bernicia and later Northumbria.

Some 18th- and 19th-century commentators, beginning with Lewis Morris, associated Ida with the figure of Welsh tradition known as Fflamddwyn ("Flame-bearer"). This Fflamddwyn was evidently an Anglo-Saxon leader opposed by Urien Rheged and his children, particularly his son Owain, who slew him. However, Rachel Bromwich notes that such an identification has little to back it; other writers, such as Thomas Stephens and William Forbes Skene, identify Fflamddwyn instead with Ida's son Theodric, noting the passages in the genealogies discussing Theodric's battles with Urien and his sons.

At the time Ida ruled, Bernician control did not extend far inland from the coast. It was not until the time of Æthelfrith, Ida's grandson, that the kingdom expanded significantly to the west. This is supported by the Historia Brittonum's description of fighting between Bernicians and the native Britons of the area, indicating ongoing resistance. It is also supported by the scarcity of sixth-century Anglo-Saxon archaeological finds from further inland.

== Notes ==
Ida of Bernicia Died: c. 559
Regnal titles
New title new kingdom	King of Bernicia c. 547 - 559	Succeeded by Glappa
