= Historia Brittonum =

Ninth-century Latin-language Welsh historical text

The History of the Britons (Latin: Historia Brittonum) is a purported history of early Britain written around 829-30 that survives in numerous recensions from after the 11th century. The Historia Brittonum is commonly attributed to Nennius, as some recensions have a preface written in that name. Some experts have dismissed the Nennian preface as a late forgery and argued that the work was actually an anonymous compilation. (Note: "Dumville has argued that the Nennian Prologue is a later forgery, so the work should therefore be treated as anonymous" (Koch 2006, p. 927)) (Note: "Formerly ascribed to one Nennius, Historia is now seen, thanks to the work of David Dumville, to be a compilation..." (Mackillop 2004, Historia Brittonum))

== Publication history ==
=== Manuscripts ===
At least five manuscripts preserve the Historia, with the Harleian being the most complete. The Chartres manuscript was the oldest until it was largely destroyed during the accidental bombing of the library in 1944, although its contents had been transcribed previously and still survive.

Manuscripts of the Historia Brittonum
Siglum	Library	Shelfmark	Date (century)	Fate	Source
Z	Chartres Municipal Library	98	c. 900	Destroyed during the May 1944 Bombing of Chartres Municipal Library	
M	Vatican	Reg. Lat. 1964	11th		
H	British Library	Harleian MS 3859	c. 1100		
C	Corpus Christi Library	139	1164		
P	British Library	Cotton Caligula A VIII	12th		

== Overview ==
The Historia Brittonum describes the supposed settlement of Britain by Trojan settlers and says that Britain was named for Brutus, a descendant of Aeneas. It was the "single most important source used by Geoffrey of Monmouth in his pseudohistorical Historia Regum Britanniae" and, through the enormous popularity of this latter work, the Historia Brittonum version of Britain's early history, including the Trojan origin tradition, was incorporated into subsequent chronicles of the long-running history of the land, such as the Middle English Brut of England, also known as The Chronicles of England.

The Historia Brittonum can be dated to about 829. The work was written no earlier than the "fourth year of [the reign of] king Mermenus" (who has been identified as Merfyn Frych ap Gwriad, king of Gwynedd). Historians have conservatively assigned 829 to the earliest date for the work, which is consistent with the statement in chapter 4 that "from the Passion of Christ 796 years have passed. But from his Incarnation are 831 years". (Note: The Prologue mentions "the 858th year of our Lord's incarnation, and in the 24th year of Mervin, king of the Britons", but presumably the preface was produced after the body of the work was written or was perhaps attached to a later revision.)

The 19th-century classicist Theodor Mommsen divided the work into seven parts:

1. Preface (Prefatio Nennii Britonum)
2. The Six Ages of the World (de sex aetatibus mundi) (§1–6)
3. History of the Britons (historia Brittonum) (§7–49)
4. Life of Patrick (vita Patricii) (§50–55)
5. Arthuriana (§ 56)
6. Genealogies (regum genealogiae cum computo) (§c. 57–66)
7. Cities of Britain (civitates Britanniae) (§66^{a})
8. Wonders of Britain (de mirabilibus Britanniae) (§67–76)

The work was the first source to portray King Arthur, who is described as a dux bellorum ('military leader') or miles ('warrior, soldier') and not as a king. It names the twelve battles that Arthur fought, but, unlike the Annales Cambriae, does not give any actual dates.

The reference in the Historia Brittonum to Arthur carrying the image of St. Mary on his shoulders in a battle has been interpreted by later commentators as a mistranslation of Arthur bearing the image of Mary on his shield; the words in Welsh are very similar.

The text makes use of two narrative techniques that are generally considered not reliable by modern academic standards: synthesizing and synchronizing history. Synthetic history combines legendary elements with fact, which makes the veracity of the text challenging to evaluate. Various specious causal connections and attempts to synchronize material from different sources and traditions also contribute to undermining the reliability of the chronicle.

=== Authorship, recensions and editions ===
The question of the nature of the text of the Historia Brittonum is one that has caused intense debate over the centuries. Some scholars have taken the position that treating the text as anonymously written would be the best approach as theories attributing authorship to Nennius have since been disputed by subsequent scholars.

==== Classical debate ====
Repudiating the so-called vindication of Nennius in 1890 by the Celtic scholar Heinrich Zimmer, Mommsen returned to the earlier view of a ninth-century Nennius merely building on a seventh-century original, which he dated to around 680. The historian Ferdinand Lot swiftly challenged Mommsen; but it was not until 1925 that the Anglo-Saxon scholar Felix Liebermann offered a major reconstruction of the Mommsen view, arguing that Nennius in fact first put the whole work into shape in the ninth century. Re-analysing the eleven manuscript variants of Mommsen, he produced a two-stemma analysis of their hypothetical descent, noting however that "Only one branch, viz. C2d2 of the second stem, preserves Nennius's name." His overall conclusion (based on uniform particularities of style) was that "The whole work...belongs to Nennius alone", but this did not prevent him from recognising that "we must lower Nennius's rank as a historian...[but] praise his patriotic heart."

==== Recent re-assessments ====
The Nennius question was re-opened in the 1970s by the historian David Dumville, who revisited the stemmatics of the various recensions and published the Vatican version. Dumville called the Nennian preface (Prefatio Nennii) a late forgery, and believes that the work underwent several anonymous revisions before reaching the forms that now survive in the various families of manuscripts. Dumville's view is largely accepted by current scholarship, though not without dissent. Peter Field in particular has argued for the authenticity of the preface, suggesting that it was left out of many recensions because it was seen as derogatory to British scholarship. However, Field believes Liebermann's earlier argument for Nennius's authorship still bears consideration.

=== Compiler's approach ===
Various introductory notes to this work invoke Nennius's (or the anonymous compiler's) words from the Prefatio that "I heaped together (coacervavi) all I could find" from various sources, not only concrete works in writing but "our ancient traditions" (i.e. oral sources) as well. This is quoted from the Apologia version of the preface. Giles's translation rendered this as "I put together", obscuring the fact that this is indeed a quote from the work and not from some commentator (See Morris's more recent translation as given in wikiquote: Historia Brittonum). Leslie Alcock was not the first to draw attention to the phrase though he may have started the recent spate of interest.

== Arthuriana ==
The Historia Brittonum has drawn attention because of its role in influencing the legends and myths surrounding King Arthur. It is the earliest source that presents Arthur as a historical figure, and is the source of several stories which were repeated and amplified by later authors.

=== Vortigern and Ambrosius ===
The Historia contains a story of the king Vortigern, who allowed the Saxons to settle in the island of Britain in return for the hand of Hengist's daughter. One legend about Vortigern says he tried to build a stronghold near Snowdon called Dinas Emrys, only to have his building materials disappear every time he tried. His advisers told him to sprinkle the blood of a fatherless boy on the site to lift the curse. Vortigern found such a youth in Ambrosius, who rebuked the wise men and revealed that the disturbance was caused by two dragons buried underground.

The tower story is repeated and embellished by Geoffrey of Monmouth in his Historia Regum Britanniae, though he attributes it to Merlin, saying "Ambrosius" is the sage's alternative name. Geoffrey includes Aurelius Ambrosius, another figure mentioned in the Historia, as a king in his own right, and also includes other characters such as Vortimer and Bishop Germanus of Auxerre.

=== Arthur's battles ===
Chapter 56 discusses twelve battles fought and won by Arthur, here called dux bellorum (war leader) rather than king:

At that time, the Saxons grew strong by virtue of their large number and increased in power in Britain. Hengist having died, however, his son Octha crossed from the northern part of Britain to the kingdom of Kent and from him are descended the kings of Kent. Then Arthur along with the kings of Britain fought against them in those days, but Arthur himself was the military commander ["dux bellorum"]. His first battle was at the mouth of the river which is called Glein. His second, third, fourth, and fifth battles were above another river which is called Dubglas and is in the region of Linnuis. The sixth battle was above the river which is called Bassas. The seventh battle was in the forest of Celidon, that is Cat Coit Celidon. The eighth battle was at the fortress of Guinnion, in which Arthur carried the image of Holy Mary ever virgin on his shoulders; and the pagans were put to flight on that day. And through the power of our Lord Jesus Christ and through the power of the blessed Virgin Mary his mother there was great slaughter among them. The ninth battle was waged in the City of the Legion. The tenth battle was waged on the banks of a river which is called Tribruit. The eleventh battle was fought on the mountain which is called Agnet. The twelfth battle was on Mount Badon in which there fell in one day 960 men from one charge by Arthur; and no one struck them down except Arthur himself, and in all the wars he emerged as victor. And while they were being defeated in all the battles, they were seeking assistance from Germany and their numbers were being augmented many times over without interruption. And they brought over kings from Germany that they might reign over them in Britain, right down to the time in which Ida reigned, who was son of Eobba. He was the first king in Bernicia, i.e., in Berneich.

Many of these battle sites are obscure and cannot be identified with any certitude. Some appear in other Welsh literature, though not necessarily explicitly connected to Arthur. Some scholars have proposed that the author incorporated the list from a now-lost Old Welsh poem, based on the fact that some of the names appear to rhyme. Others argue that the author included battles not previously associated with Arthur, and perhaps even made them up entirely. The odd description of Arthur bearing the image of the Virgin Mary on his shoulders at Guinnion might stem from a conflation of the Welsh word iscuit (shield) with iscuid (shoulders).

A similar story to that attached to Guinnion also appears in the Annales Cambriae; here, Arthur is described as carrying "the cross of our Lord Jesus Christ on his shoulders for three days and three nights…", though here the battle is said to be Badon rather than Guinnion. T. M. Charles-Edwards argues that these accounts both refer to a single source. Other scholars, however, such as Thomas Jones and N. J. Higham, argue that the Annales account is based directly on the Historia, suggesting the name of the battle was switched from the unknown Guinnion to the famous Badon, and that the icon Arthur carries was replaced with a more common one.

The Battle of Mount Badon is associated with Arthur in several later texts, but not in any that predate the Historia. It was clearly a historical battle described by Gildas, who does not mention the name of the Britons' leader. He does however mention Aurelius Ambrosius as a great scourge of the Saxons immediately prior. Of the other battles, only the Battle of Tribruit is generally agreed to be associated with Arthur in another early Welsh source. Tribruit appears as Tryfrwyd in the Old Welsh poem Pa Gur?, dating to perhaps the mid-ninth century. This poem follows the story of a battle against cinbin, or dogheads, whom Arthur's men fought in the mountains of Eidyn (Edinburgh); in the Tryfrwyd battle they spar with a character named Garwlwyd (Rough-Gray), who is likely the Gwrgi Garwlwyd (Man-Dog Rough-Grey) who appears in one of the Welsh Triads. Arthur's main protagonist in the fight is Bedwyr, later known as Sir Bedivere, and the poem also mentions the euhemerized god Manawydan. "The City of the Legion" may be a reference to Caerleon, whose name translates as such, but it might also refer to Chester, the site of a large Roman base.

Cat Coit Celidon is probably a reference to the Caledonian Forest (Coed Celyddon) which once covered the Southern Uplands of Scotland. Scholar Marged Haycock has suggested that this battle can be identified with the Cad Goddeu, the "Battle of the Trees", best known from the tenth-century poem Cad Goddeu. Arthur is mentioned towards the end of this poem, and a fragment of a story about the battle preserved in manuscript Peniarth 98B states that the battle had an alternative name, Cad Achren, which suggests a connection with the Caer Ochren raided by Arthur in the earlier poem Preiddeu Annwfn.

Various writers have asserted that this chapter supports a historical basis for King Arthur and have tried to identify the twelve battles with historical feuds or locales (see Sites and places associated with Arthurian legend). On the other hand, Caitlin Green argues that the only identifiable battles linked explicitly with Arthur in Old Welsh sources are mythological, undermining any claims that the battles had a basis in history.

=== Mirabilia ===
Attached to the Historia is a section called De mirabilibus Britanniae (or simply Mirabilia for short, a Latin word meaning 'marvels, miracles'). It gives a list of 13 topographical marvels, or wonders of Britain, (Note: The original Latin text proper only counts up to the fourth "Quartum miraculum", and thereafter just keeping adding "another miracle (Aliud miraculum)". Note that in Mommsen's edition, the text of the so-called Nennius interpretatus (Zimer's Latin translation of the Irish Historia Brittonum) is given on a parallel column.) followed by a few marvels of Anglesey (Menand insulae or Mona) and of Ireland. The Mirabilia section is thought to not be part of the original work, but to have been composed shortly after (early 9th cent.). (Note: G. Ashe's entry under "Nennius", Lacy et al. edd. 1986 (Reprint 1987), Arth. Ency., p. 406 and Lacy et al. edd. 1991, New Arth. Ency.,p. 343: "An appendix of Mirabilia ("Marvels") may be a little later than the rest of the book, but not much".)

Two of the marvels are Arthurian lore (Chapter 73 of the Historia). Old editions give "Troynt" as the name of the great boar and "Anir" as the name of Arthur's tragic son in the Harleian manuscript, but Fletcher suggested the variant readings "Troit" and "Amr" be preferred since they are closer to the Welsh forms of those names.

The first concerns Arthur's dog, Cabal (Cavall in Welsh), and the footprint it left while chasing the boar Troynt (→Troit) (Twrch Trwyth in Welsh):

There is another marvel in the region which is called Buelt. There is a mound of stones there and one stone placed above the pile with the pawprint of a dog in it. When Cabal, who was the dog of Arthur the soldier, was hunting the boar Troynt, he impressed his print in the stone, and afterwards Arthur assembled a stone mound under the stone with the print of his dog, and it is called the Carn Cabal. And men come and remove the stone in their hands for the length of a day and a night; and on the next day it is found on top of its mound. (Note: A text and translation of this passage was given in Lady Charlotte Guest's notes to her translation of Kilhwch ac Olwan, and her book ran a facsimile of the Latin text of the above passage from Harley MS 3859.)

The second concerns Arthur's son Anir or Amr (Amhar in Welsh) and his sepulchre:

There is another wonder in the region which is called Ercing. A tomb is located there next to a spring which is called Licat Amr; and the name of the man who is buried in the tomb was called thus: Amr(←Anir). He was the son of Arthur the soldier, and Arthur himself killed and buried him in that very place. And men come to measure the grave and find it sometimes six feet in length, sometimes nine, sometimes twelve, sometimes fifteen. At whatever length you might measure it at one time, a second time you will not find it to have the same length—and I myself have put this to the test.

== Germanus ==
Chapters relating events in the life of Saint Germanus of Auxerre claim to be excerpts from a (now lost) biography of the saint. The document includes a collection of traditions about Saint Patrick, as well as a section describing events in the North of England in the sixth and seventh centuries, starting with a paragraph about the beginnings of Welsh literature:

At that time, Talhaiarn Cataguen was famed for poetry, and Neirin, and Taliesin and Bluchbard, and Cian, who is called Guenith Guaut, were all famous at the same time in British poetry.

== Associated works ==
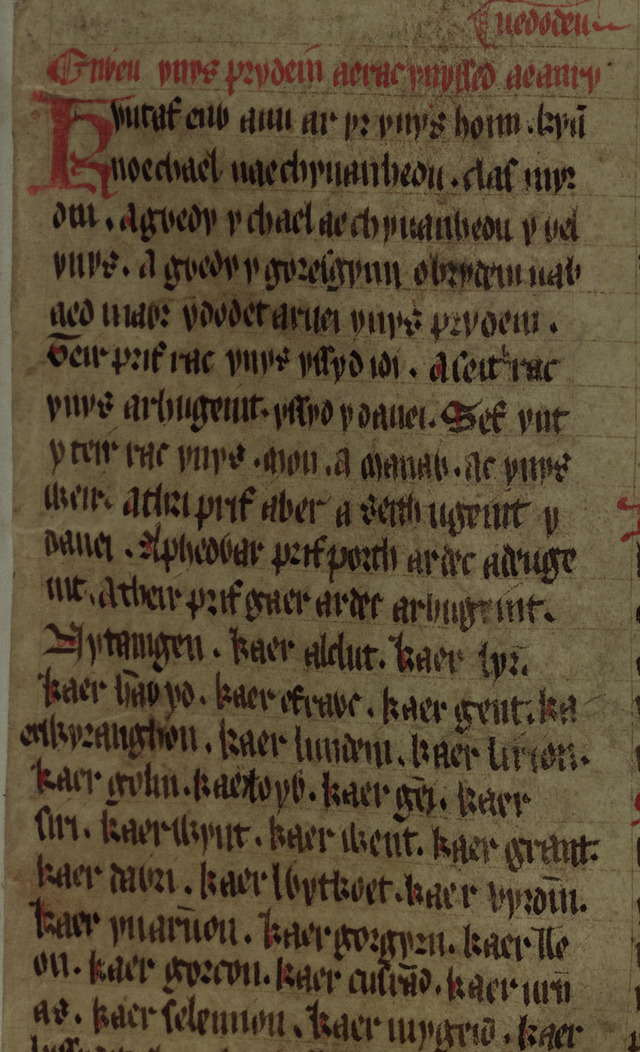
The opening few lines of the Middle Welsh manuscript Enwau ac Anryfeddodau Ynys Prydain from the Red Book of Hergest, which continued the wonders tradition of geographical descriptions of the Island of Britain after the Historia

There are a number of works that are frequently associated with the Historia Brittonum, in part because some of them first appear with the Harleian manuscript, and partly because, when the Historia Britonum is studied, these sources are eventually mentioned.

- The Frankish Table of Nations – Written around 520, this is a short genealogical text in the mould of the Biblical Table of Nations. Both tables are incorporated into the genealogical sections of the Historia. The Frankish Table transmits to the Historia some information derived from Tacitus' Germania, albeit in garbled form. It is probably Byzantine in origin.
- The Lebor Bretnach – An Irish translation of the Historia Brittonum and a recension of the 'Nennian' Historia Brittonum.
- The Annales Cambriae – This is a chronicle consisting of a series of unnumbered years, from AD 445 to 977, some of which have events added. Two notable events are next to AD 516, which describes The Battle of Badon, and 537, which describes the Battle of Camlann, "in which Arthur and Mordred fell." A version of this was used as a starting point for later Welsh Chronicles.
- Welsh Genealogies – One of many collections of Welsh genealogies, this documents the lineage of Hywel Dda, king of Wales, and several of his contemporaries. The Pillar of Eliseg is frequently discussed in connection with these genealogies.
- Anglo-Saxon Genealogies – A collection of genealogies of the kings of five pre-Viking kingdoms: Bernicia, Deira, Kent, East Anglia, and Mercia. A similar collection either derived from or sharing a similar source with this collection is found in the stand-alone Anglian collection of royal pedigrees, and embedded within annals of the Anglo-Saxon Chronicle.
