= Sorrell =

Sorrell may refer to:

== People ==
=== Surname ===
- Alan Sorrell (1904–1974), English artist and writer
- Alan Sorrell (footballer) (1923–2011), Australian rules footballer
- Andrew Sorrell (born 1985), American politician from Alabama
- Barryn Sorrell (born 2002), American football player
- Billy Sorrell (1940–2008), American professional baseball player
- Caden Sorrell (born 2005), American professional baseball player
- Dennis Sorrell (1940–2019), English professional footballer
- Elizabeth Sorrell 1916–1991), British water-colour painter
- Frances Sorrell (fl. 2010s), British designer
- Frank Sorrell (1894–1964), American politician from Nebraska
- Henry Sorrell (1943–2025), American football player
- Herbert Sorrell (1897–1973), American union leader
- Jeannette Sorrell (fl. 1980s–present), American conductor and harpsichordist
- John Sorrell (designer) (born 1945), British designer
- John Sorrell (ice hockey) (1906–1984), Canadian ice hockey player
- Jonathan Sorrell (born 1977), British businessman
- Julia Sorrell (born 1955), British artist
- Keturah Sorrell (1912–2012), English opera singer and actress
- Kevin Sorrell (born 1977), English rugby player
- Martin Sorrell (born 1945), English businessman
- Michael Sorrell (born 1966), American university administrator
- Nancy Sorrell (born 1974), English lap dancer, model, actress and TV presenter
- Ray Sorrell (born 1938), former Australian rules footballer
- Richard Sorrell (born 1948), British artist
- Tania Sorrell (born 1947), Australian physician
- Thomas W. Sorrell (1917–1984), American law enforcement officer from Vermont
- Tony Sorrell (born 1966), English professional footballer
- Trevor Sorrell (born 1956), Australian rules footballer
- Vic Sorrell (1901–1972), American Major League Baseball pitcher
- William Sorrell (born 1947), American politician from Vermont

=== Given name ===
- Sorrell Booke (1930–1994), American actor best known for playing Boss Hogg on The Dukes of Hazzard
- Sorrell Leczkowski, a victim of the 2017 Manchester Arena bombing

== Fictional characters ==
- Buddy Sorrell, a regular character on the television show The Dick Van Dyke Show
- Vinny Sorrell, on Coronation Street between 1999 and 2000

== Other uses ==
- Sorell, Tasmania, Australia, a town
- Sorrell, Virginia, United States, an unincorporated community
- Sorrell Aviation, an American aircraft manufacturer
- Sorrell v. IMS Health Inc., a 2011 United States Supreme Court decision

== See also ==
- Walter Sorrells (born 1962), American author of mystery and suspense novels
- Sorel (disambiguation)
- Sorell (disambiguation)
- Sorrel (disambiguation)
