= Sea sorrel =

Sea sorrel or in French oseille de mer can refer to different seaweeds:

- Desmarestia viridis, specifically
- Desmarestia, the entire genus

== See also ==
- Sorrel (disambiguation)
- Sorel (disambiguation)
- Sorell (disambiguation)
- Sorrell (disambiguation)
