= Sorel =

Sorel may refer to:

== Places ==
- Sorel, Somme, a commune of the Somme département, in France
- Sorel-Tracy, city in Quebec, Canada
  - Sorel Airport, near Sorel-Tracy

== People ==
=== Given name ===
- Sorel Carradine (born 1985), American actress
- Sorel Cohen (born 1936), Canadian photographer and visual artist
- Sorel Etrog (1933–2014), Romanian-born Israeli-Canadian artist, writer, and sculptor
- Sorel Jacinthe, Haitian politician
- Sorel-Arthur Kembe (born 1975), Congolese fencer
- Sorel Mizzi (born 1986), Canadian professional poker player

=== Surname ===
- Agnès Sorel (1421–1450), mistress of Charles VII of France
- Albert Sorel (1842–1906), French historian
- Cécile Sorel (1873–1966), French comic actress
- Charles Sorel, sieur de Souvigny (1602–1674), French novelist
- Edward Sorel (born 1929), American illustrator and cartoonist
- Georges Sorel (1847–1922), French philosopher and theorist of revolutionary syndicalism
- Gustaaf Sorel (1905–1980), Belgian painter of gloomy subjects
- Jean Sorel (born 1934), French actor
- Léon de Sorel (1655–1743), French naval officer, governor of Saint-Domingue
- Louise Sorel (born 1940), American actress
- Nancy Sorel (born 1964), Canadian-American TV actress
- Ruth Abramovitsch Sorel (1907–1974), German dancer and choreographer
- Stanislas Sorel (1803–1871), French engineer who invented Sorel cement, a hydraulic cement
- Ted Sorel (1936–2010), American actor

== Fictional characters ==
- Sorel Bliss, character from Noël Coward's 1925 play "Hay Fever"
- Amy Sorel, fictional character in the Soul series
- Dominic Sorel, fictional character in the anime and manga series Eureka Seven
- Julien Sorel, the main character of the novel The Red and the Black by Stendhal
- Raphael Sorel, fictional character in the Soul series

== Other uses ==
- Sorel (brand), a shoe brand established by the defunct Canadian company Kaufman Footwear, now a branded subsidiary of Columbia Sportswear
- Sorel (horse), in the French epic poem The Song of Roland
- Sorel cement (also known as magnesia cement), a non-hydraulic cement

== See also ==
- Sorell (disambiguation)
- Sorrel (disambiguation)
- Sorrell (disambiguation)
- Saurel (surname)
