= Who Were the British? =

Television program

Who Were the British? is a six-part television series made by Anglia Television, and written and presented by Brian Hope-Taylor, focusing on the early history and origins of Britain. It was shown on ITV in a late-night slot, with starting times varying between 10:40pm and 11:20pm. The Lost Centuries was a sequel.

== Episode guide ==
1. The Conquerors (TX: 20 June 1966)

The Roman invasion of Britain by Julius Caesar, Roy long and Claudius. The tribes living in Britain at the time may have been barbarians but they were not savages.

2. The Investigators (TX: 27 June 1966)

How archaeological excavation is done and what it tells us. Shows excavations at Dunbar and Maiden Castle.

3. The Immigrants (TX: 4 July 1966)

The origins of The Ancient Britons and their Celtic connections. The use of flint and bronze. Reconstruction of an Iron Age settlement. Sites visited include Grimes Graves; Skara Brae, Orkney.

4. The Believers (TX: 11 July 1966)

The beliefs of the Ancient British and the ritual element in their lives. Tollund Man, Denmark. Sites visited include Maeshowe, Orkney; West Kennet, Silbury Hill; Stonehenge; Avebury.

5. The Builders (TX: 18 July 1966)

The lasting influence of the Romans - the building of roads, towns, and Hadrian's Wall.

6. The Inheritors TX: 25 July 1966)

The Roman legacy in Britain -Bath, Lullingstone villa.

The series received two repeat runs on ITV: 5 April 1967 - 10 May 1967 and 27 August 1971 - 1 October 1971 respectively.

== Production credits ==
Director: Forbes Taylor

Producer: Peter Hunt

Presenter: Brian Hope-Taylor

Contributor: Glyn Daniel

Director of photography: Ian Craig

Film editor: Paul Shortall

Sound recordists: Charles Earl, Roy Charman

Sound editor: Pat Holmes

Designer: Peter Farman

Drawings: Alan Sorrell

== Current availability ==
The entire series can viewed for educational purposes through the online academic archive, Film and Sound Online - within the Anglia Television Library collection. This archive is available to teachers and students in UK Further and Higher Education institutions possessing Athens accounts.
