= Sara Angelucci =

Canadian artist

- Born: 1962 (age 63–64); Hamilton, Ontario
- Education: NSCAD University, University of Guelph
- Notable work: Aviary (2013)
- Website: www.sara-angelucci.ca

Sara Angelucci (born 1962) is a Canadian artist based in Toronto, Ontario, Canada.

== Education ==
She has a B.A. (Hons.) in Art History and B.F.A in Fine Arts from University of Guelph, and an M.F.A. from NSCAD University.

== Work ==
Angelucci works primarily in photography, video and audio. She has exhibited her photography across Canada including exhibitions at the Art Gallery of York University, Le Mois de la Photo in Montreal, and the St. Mary's University Art Gallery in Halifax. Her work has been included in group shows internationally in the United States, Europe, and at the Pingyao Biennale in China.

Angelucci's works explore archival materials such as home movies, snapshots and vintage portraits and their limitations. Her major works include Aviary (2013), an exhibition of avian-morphed, faux-Victorian portrait photography, video and audio in the collection of Art Gallery of York University. The photographs in Aviary embody many themes of the nineteenth century. Born of the domestic realm, they express a conflation of interests where the family photo album, with its role of commemoration, is brought together with natural science and spiritual emanations. Made by combining photographs of endangered or extinct North American birds with anonymous nineteenth century cartes-de-visite portraits—they portray creatures about to become ghosts. Of the two extinct birds featured in the series, the plight of the passenger pigeon is particularly telling. Once the most numerous bird in North America, numbering in the billions, it was wiped out by 1914 through a combination of brutal over-hunting and habitat destruction.

She served as an Artist-in-residence at the Art Gallery of Ontario from November 2013 to January 2014.

Currently, she is an adjunct professor in Photography at the School of Image Arts at Toronto Metropolitan University.

== Exhibitions ==
- "Aviary" in Apparaître - Disparaître, 22 septembre - 24 novembre 2019. Fondation Grantham pour l’art et l’environnement, Saint-Edmond-de-Grantham, Québec
- "Aviary & new works" September 18 to October 31, 2015 at the Patrick Mikhail Gallery in Montreal, Quebec, Canada
- "A Mourning Chorus" September 26, 2014 at the Royal Ontario Museum in Toronto, Ontario, Canada
- Public performance of "A Mourning Chorus" February 5, 2014 at the Walker Court in the Art Gallery of Ontario in Toronto, Ontario, Canada
- participated in (Da bao)(Takeout) January 25 to March 23, 2014 at Surrey Art Gallery curated by Shannon Anderson and Doug Lewis
- Provenance Unknown April 10 to June 16, 2013 at the Art Gallery of York University
- "Lacrimosa" May 8 to May 29, 2010 at the Wynick/Tuck Gallery in Toronto, Ontario, Canada
- Somewhere in Between April 1 to May 14, 2006 at Cambridge Galleries Queen's Square
- Seeking Grace video performance screened in 2003 Toronto International Media Art Biennial, October 2003
- The perfect past March 23 to April 22, 2000 at Gallery TPW
