= Doon Hill (East Lothian) =

Hill in East Lothian, Scotland

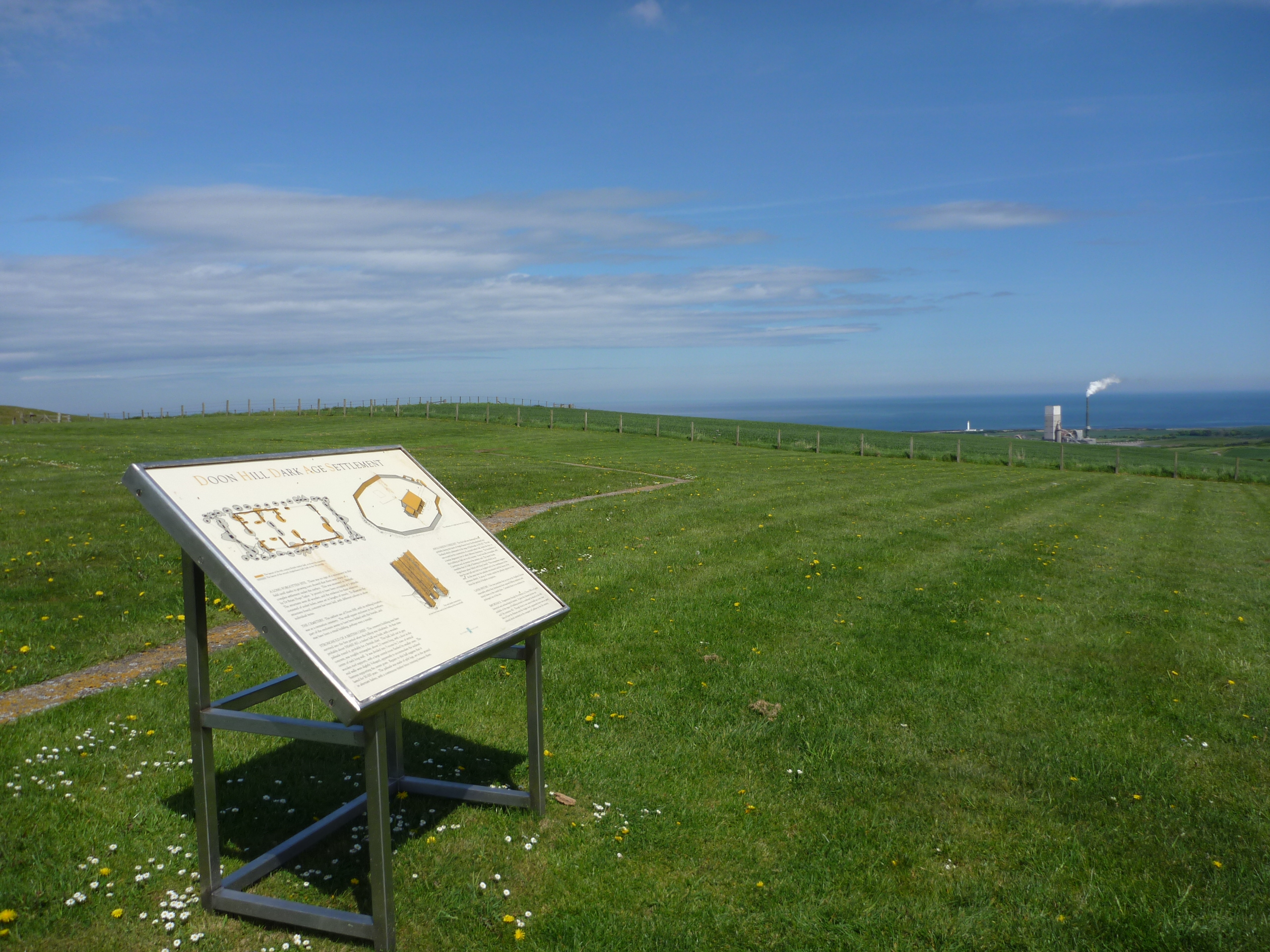
- An information board near the summit

Highest point
- Elevation: 177 m (581 ft)
- Coordinates: 55°58′23″N 2°30′23″W

Geography
- Location: East Lothian, Scotland
- OS grid: NT 67888 76148
- Topo map: OS Explorer 351

Doon Hill is a hill in East Lothian, about 500 metres (0.31 mi) east of Spott, and 3 kilometres (1.9 mi) south of Dunbar. Its peak is 177 metres (581 ft) above sea level.

Near its summit are archaeological remains of a pair of wooden halls. These were noticed on aerial photographs, and first excavated between 1964 and 1966 by Brian Hope-Taylor, who interpreted them to be a pair of successive structures, one of which replaced the other on the same site after the first was destroyed by fire. The later hall is believed to have been built by Anglo-Saxons around the year 640. The older hall was originally thought to have been built by pre-Anglo-Saxon Britons, but radiocarbon dating has shown it to have been much older, dating to around 4000 BCE in the Neolithic period.

The hill forms part of the site of two significant battles between English and Scottish forces, each called the Battle of Dunbar for the nearby town. There was fighting on the hill in the 1296 Battle on Dunbar, when Edward I of England invaded Scotland to punish John Balliol for failing to support him militarily in France. It was later the site of the Scottish encampment prior to the battle in 1650 between Cromwell's New Model Army and a Scottish army commanded by David Leslie, which formed part of the final campaign of the Wars of the Three Kingdoms.
