= Bamburgh Castle =

Medieval castle in Northumberland, England

- Bamburgh, Northumberland
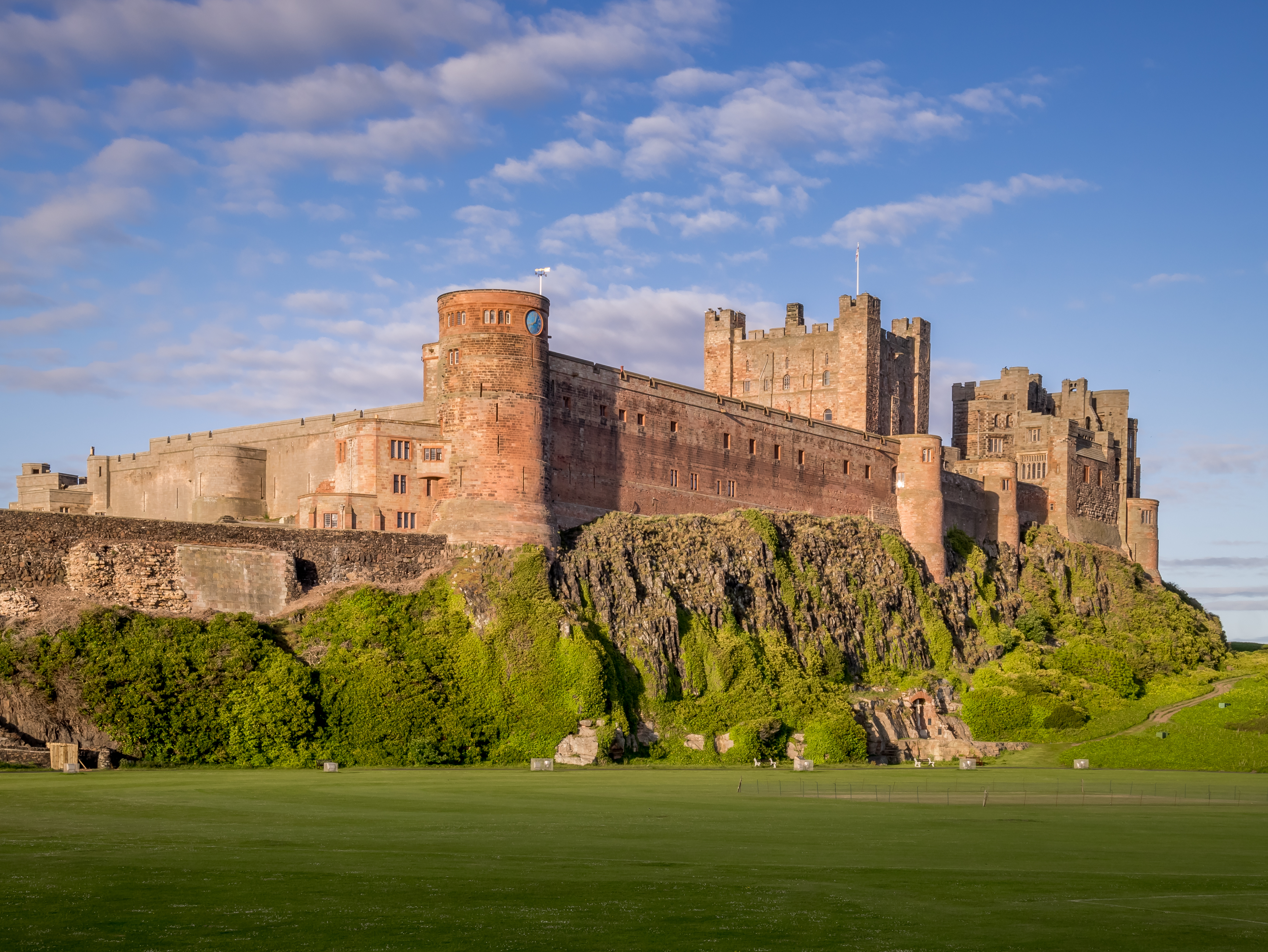
- Bamburgh Castle from the southwest

Site information
- Owner: Armstrong family
- Open to the public: Yes

Listed Building – Grade I
- Designated: 4 January 1952
- Reference no.: 1280155

Location
- Location within Northumberland
- Coordinates: 55.608°N 1.709°W

Site history
- Built: 11th century

Airfield information
- Identifiers

Bamburgh Castle, on the northeast coast of England, by the village of Bamburgh in Northumberland, is a Grade I listed building.

The site was originally the location of a Celtic Brittonic fort known as Din Guarie and may have been the capital of the kingdom of Bernicia from its foundation c. 420 to 547. In that last year, it was captured by King Ida of Bernicia. After passing between the Britons and the Anglo-Saxons three times, the fort came under Anglo-Saxon control in 590. The Normans later built a new castle on the site, which forms the core of the present one. After a revolt in 1095 supported by the castle's owner, it became the property of the English monarch.

In the 17th century, financial difficulties led to the castle deteriorating, but it was restored by various owners during the 18th and 19th centuries. It was finally bought by the Victorian era industrialist William Armstrong, who completed its restoration. The castle is open to the public and owned by Francis Watson-Armstrong who is the son of the 3rd Baron Armstrong.

== History ==
=== Medieval history ===
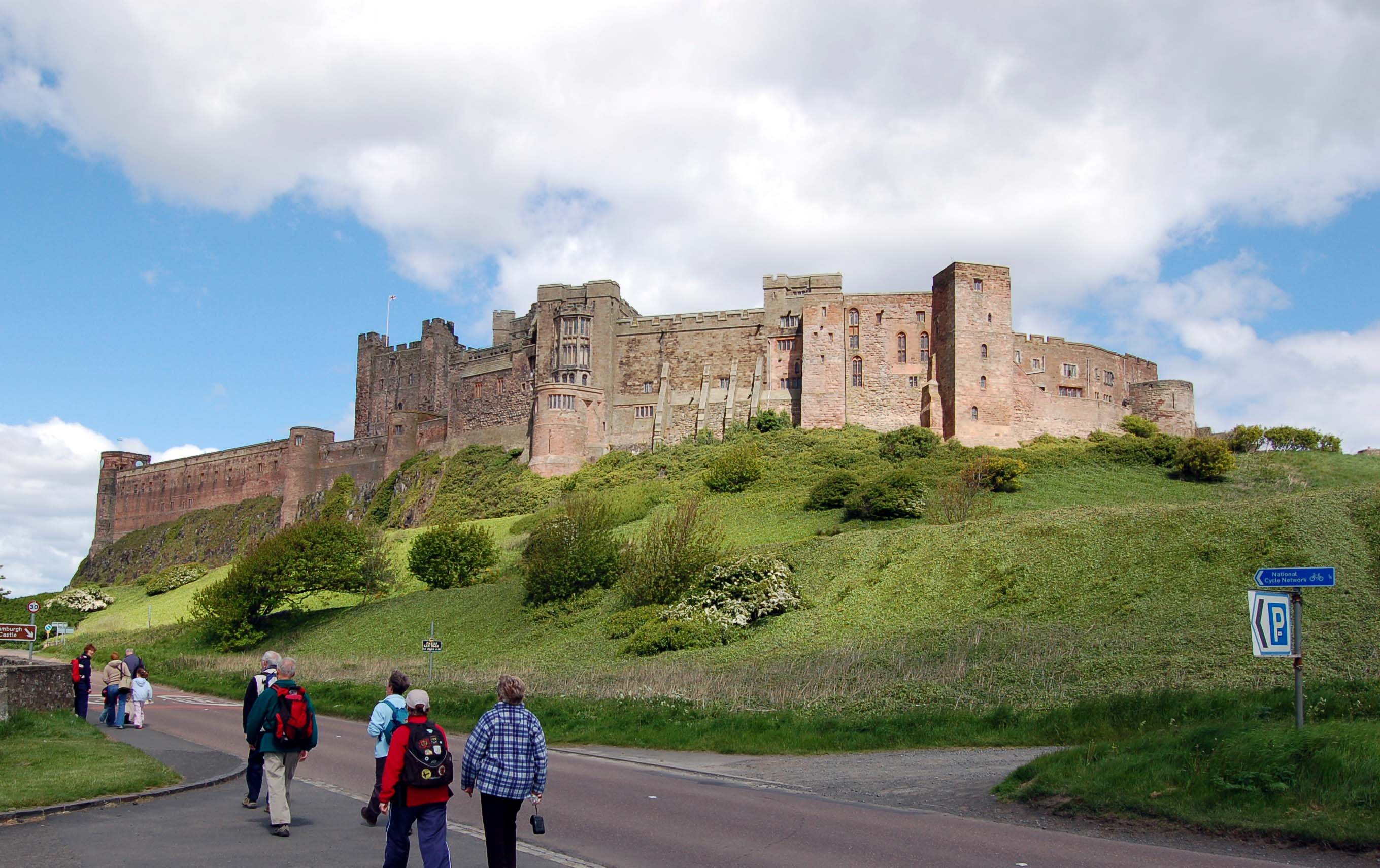
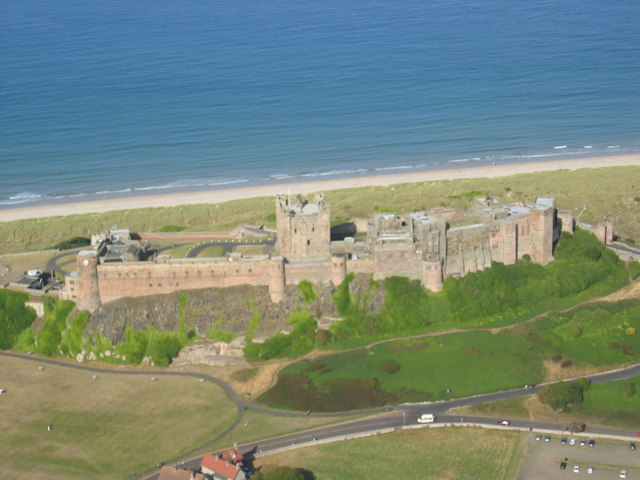
The southwestern face of Bamburgh Castle, seen from ground level (top) and from the air (below)

Built on top of a black crag of volcanic dolerite, and part of the Whin Sill, the location was previously home to a fort of the indigenous Celtic Britons known as Din Guarie. It may have been the capital of the kingdom of Bernicia, the realm of the Gododdin people, from the realm's foundation c. 420 until 547, the year of the first written reference to the castle. In that year the citadel was captured by the Anglo-Saxon ruler Ida of Bernicia (Beornice) and became Ida's seat.

The castle was briefly retaken by the Britons from his son Hussa during the war of 590 before being retaken later the same year. Circa 600, Hussa's successor Æthelfrith passed it on to his wife Bebba, from whom the early name Bebbanburh was derived.

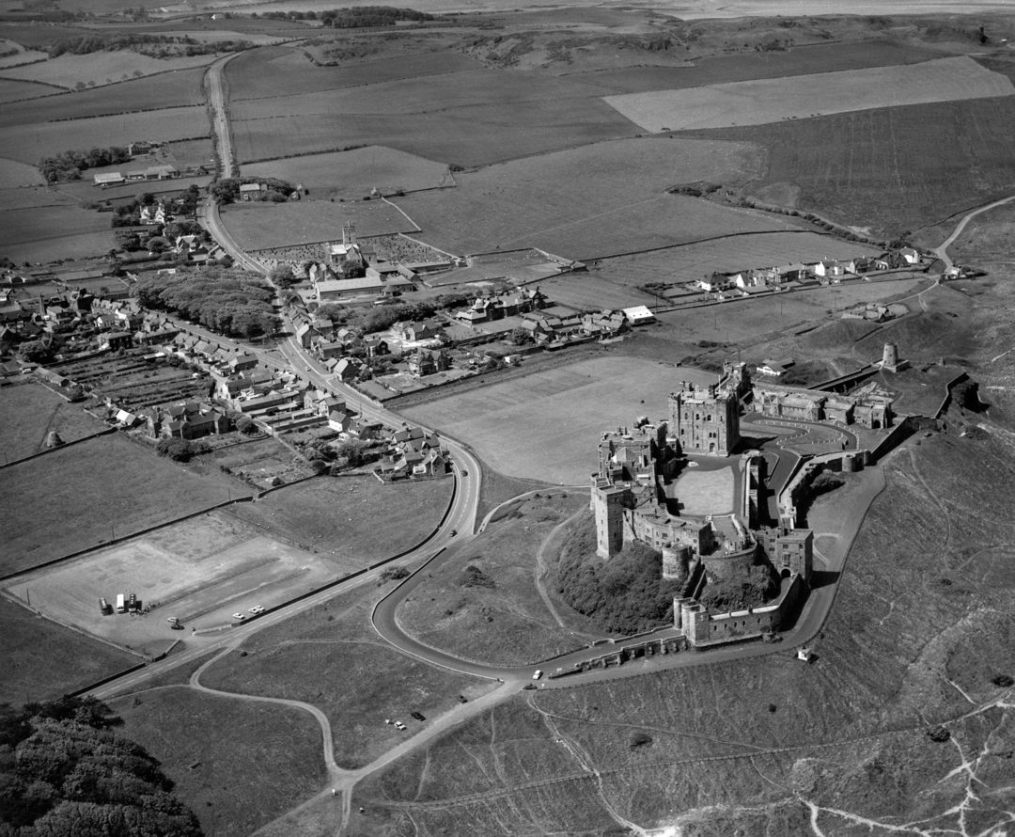
Aerial photograph from 1973 showing the position of the castle, northeast of Bamburgh village

The Normans built a new castle on the site, which forms the core of the present one. William II unsuccessfully besieged it in 1095 during a revolt supported by its owner, Robert de Mowbray, Earl of Northumbria. After Robert was captured, his wife continued the defence until coerced to surrender by the king's threat to blind her husband.

Bamburgh then became the property of the reigning English monarch. Henry II probably built the keep as it was complete by 1164. Following the Siege of Acre in 1191, and as a reward for his service, King Richard I appointed Sir John Forster the first Governor of Bamburgh Castle. Following the defeat of the Scots at the Battle of Neville's Cross in 1346, King David II was held prisoner at Bamburgh Castle.

During the civil wars at the end of King John's reign, the castle was under the control of Philip of Oldcoates. In 1464 during the Wars of the Roses, it was subject to a nine-month siege by Richard Neville, 16th Earl of Warwick, the "Kingmaker", on behalf of the Yorkists which was marked by the extensive use of artillery. It became the first British castle to be taken by gunfire.

=== Modern history ===
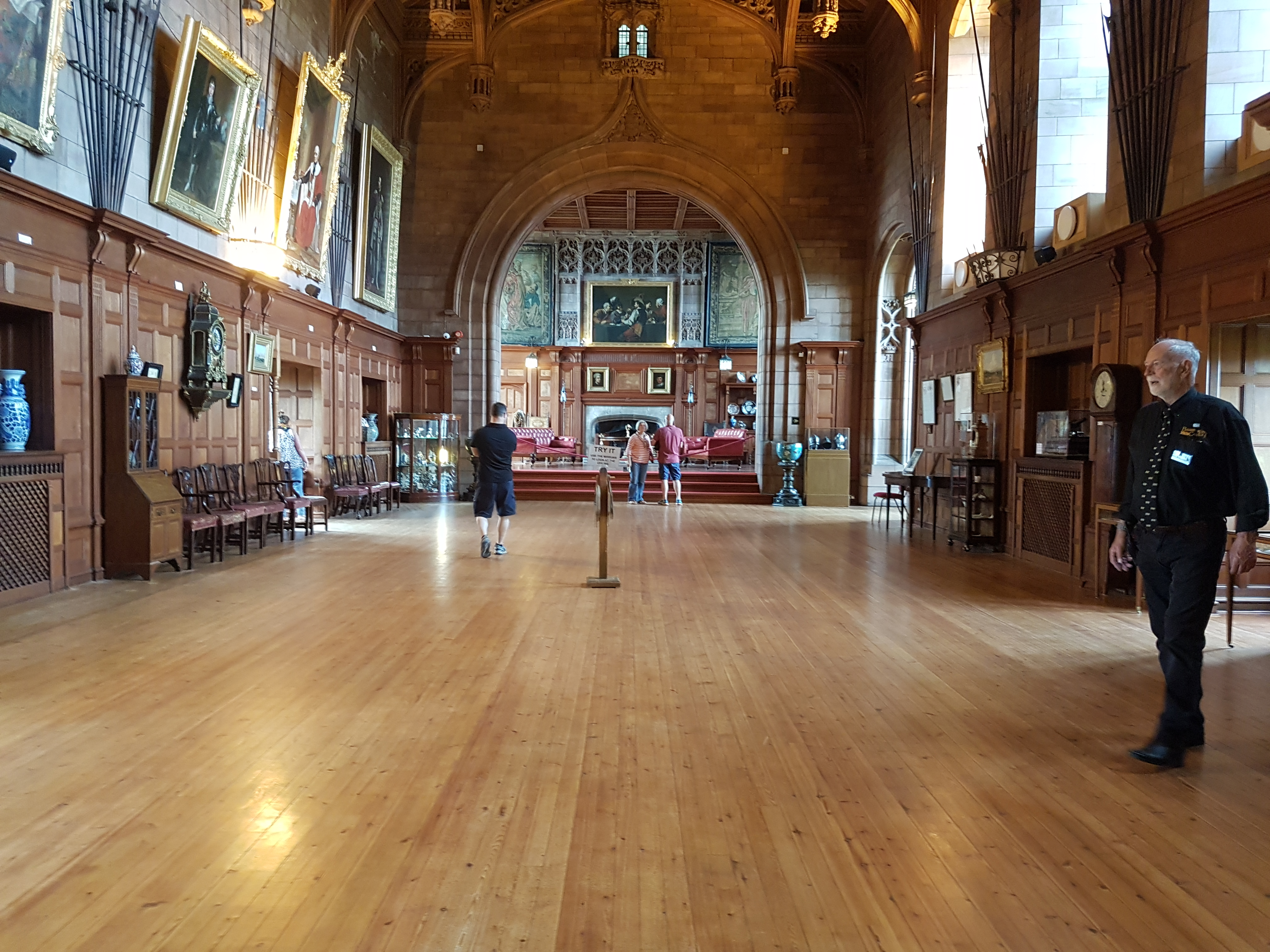
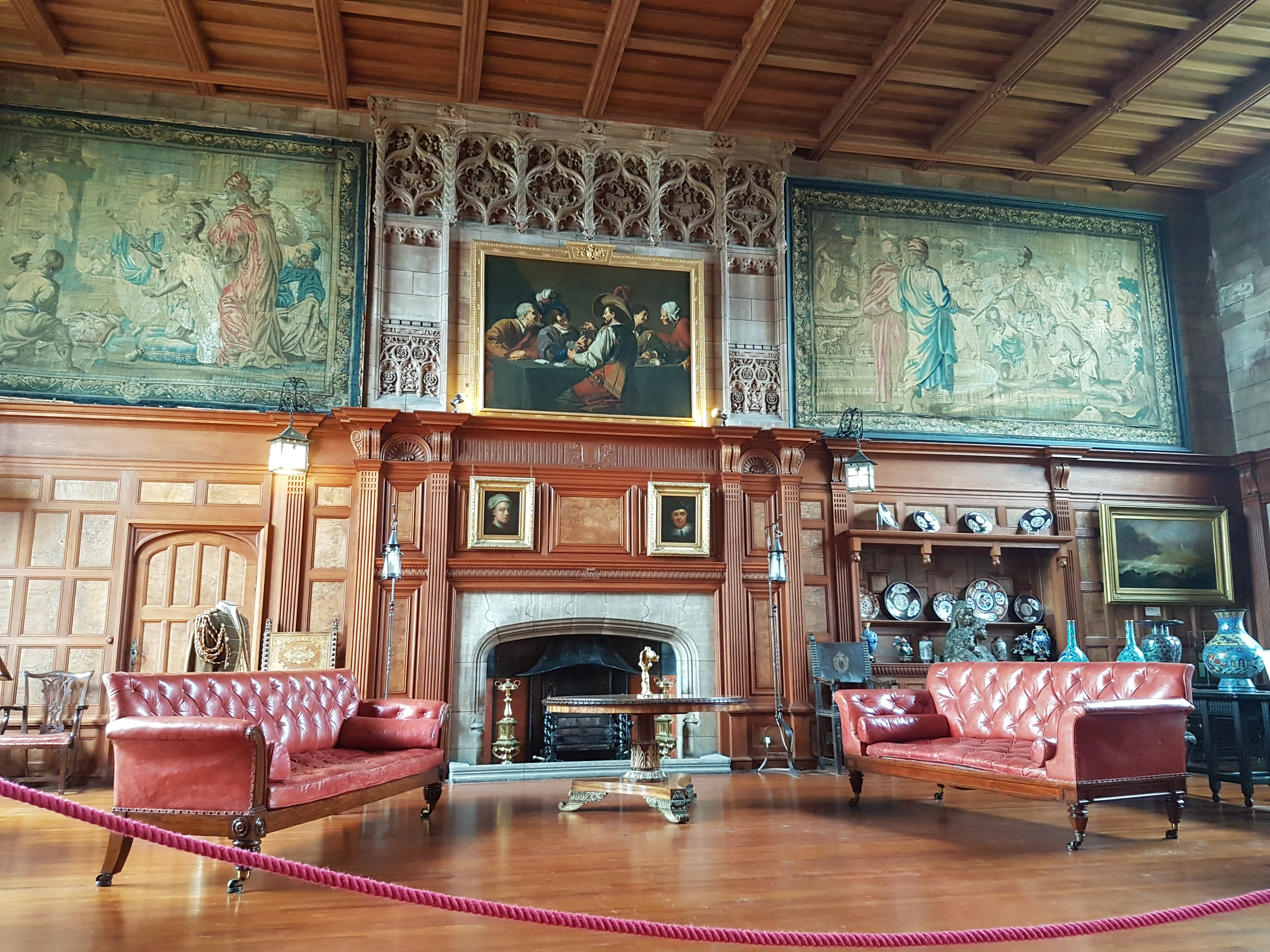
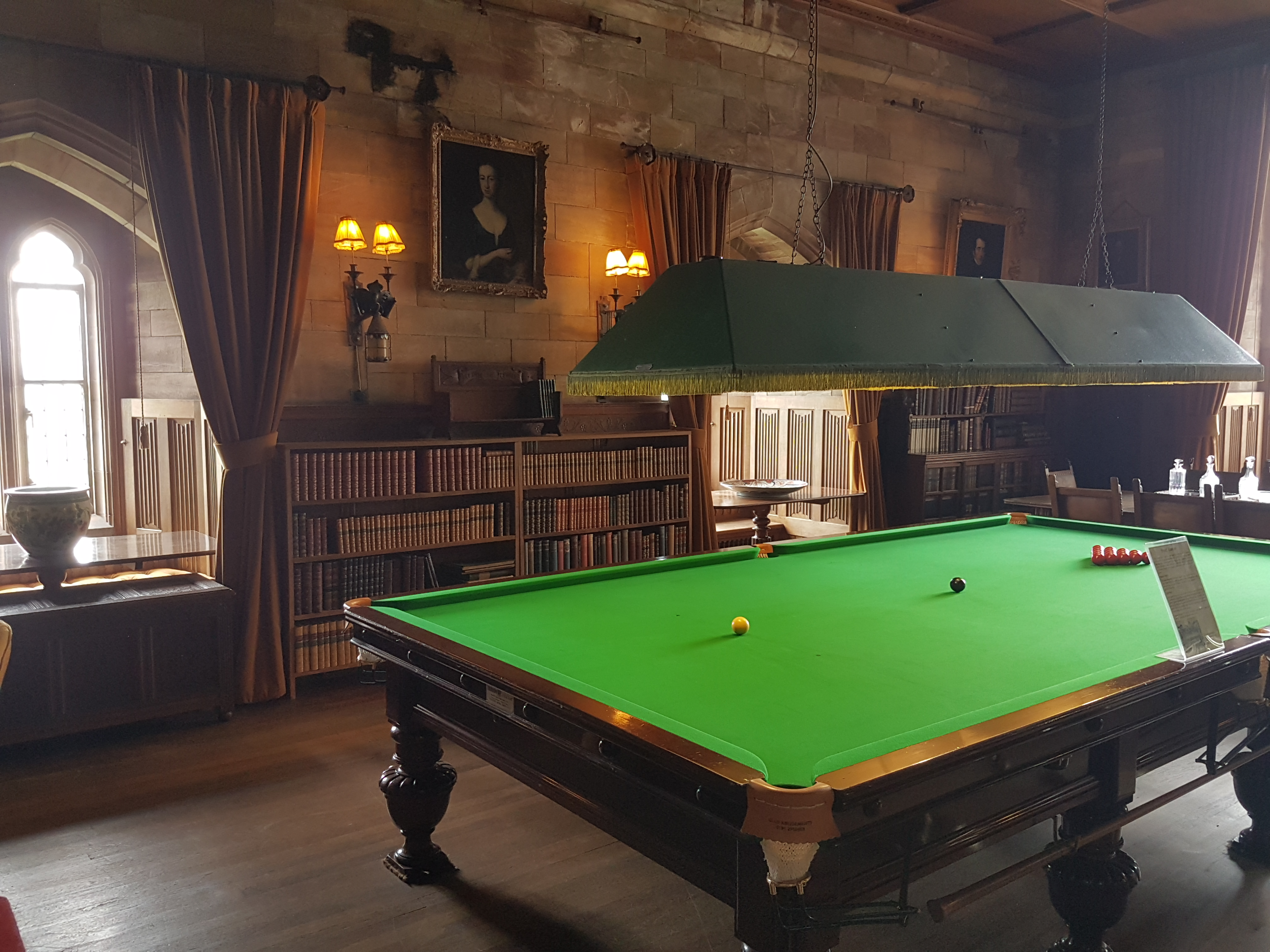
The State Rooms of Bamburgh Castle; in top-centre of middle image, The Card Players, by Theodoor Rombouts, c. 1630

The Forster family of Northumberland continued to provide the Crown with successive governors of the castle until the Crown granted ownership (or a lease according to some sources) of the church and the castle to another Sir John Forster in the mid-1500s, after the Dissolution of the Monasteries. The family retained ownership until William Forster (died 1700) was posthumously declared bankrupt, and his estates, including the castle, were sold to Lord Crew, Bishop of Durham (husband of Sir William's sister, Dorothy) under an Act of Parliament to settle the debts in 1704.

Crewe placed the castle in the hands of a board of trustees chaired by Thomas Sharp, the Archdeacon of Northumberland. Following the death of Thomas Sharp, leadership of the board of trustees passed to John Sharp (Thomas Sharp's son, also Archdeacon of Northumberland) who refurbished the castle keep and court rooms and established a hospital on the site. In 1894, the castle was bought by the Victorian industrialist William Armstrong, who completed the restoration in 1905.

During the Second World War, pillboxes were established in the sand dunes to protect the castle and surrounding area from German invasion and, in 1944, a Royal Navy corvette was named HMS Bamborough Castle after the castle. The castle still remains in the ownership of the Armstrong family.

After the War, the castle became a Grade I Listed property. The description included this comment about the status of the building in 1952 and its history:

Castle, divided into apartments. C12; ruinous when acquired by Lord Crewe in 1704 and made habitable after his death by Dr. Sharpe ... Acquired by Lord Armstrong, who had extensive restoration and rebuilding of high quality by C. J. Ferguson, 1894–1904. Squared sandstone and ashlar.

=== Location ===
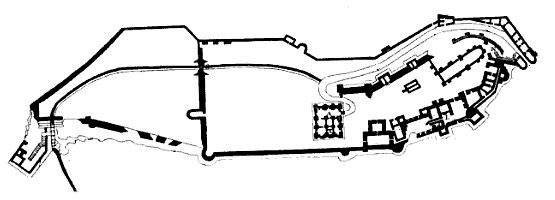
An 1825 plan of the castle

About 9 miles (14 km) to the south on a point of coastal land is the ancient fortress of Dunstanburgh Castle and about 5 miles (8 km) to the north is Lindisfarne Castle on Holy Island. Inland about 16 miles (26 km) to the south is Alnwick Castle, the home of the Duke of Northumberland.

=== Environmental factors ===
Air quality levels at Bamburgh Castle are excellent due to the absence of industrial sources in the region. Sound levels near the north–south road passing by Bamburgh Castle are in the range of 59 to 63 dBA in the daytime (Northumberland Sound Mapping Study, Northumberland, England, June 2003). Nearby are breeding colonies of Arctic and common terns on the inner Farne Islands, and of Atlantic puffin, European shag and razorbill on Staple Island.

=== Archaeology at Bamburgh ===
Archaeological excavations were started in the 1960s by Brian Hope-Taylor, who discovered the gold plaque known as the Bamburgh Beast as well as the Bamburgh Sword. Since 1996, the Bamburgh Research Project has been investigating the archaeology and history of the Castle and Bamburgh area. The project has concentrated on the fortress site and the early medieval burial ground at the Bowl Hole, located in sand dunes to the south of the castle, evidence of which had first been revealed in a storm of 1817.

During excavations at the Bowl Hole between 1998 and 2007, the remains of 120 individuals from the 7th and 8th century were discovered in that graveyard. The research project was led by Professor Charlotte Roberts of Durham University, and found remains of individuals who had originated from Ireland, Scotland, Scandinavia, the Mediterranean and North Africa.

Finally, in 2016, they were moved into the crypt of St Aidan's Church, Bamburgh; the crypt can be viewed by visitors through a small gate.

=== Armstrong and Aviation Artefacts Museum ===
The castle's laundry rooms feature the Armstrong and Aviation Artefacts Museum, with exhibits about Victorian industrialist William Armstrong and Armstrong Whitworth, the manufacturing company he founded. Displays include engines, artillery and weaponry, and aviation artefacts from two world wars.

== Civil parish ==
Bamburgh Castle was a civil parish, in 1951 the parish had a population of 18. Bamburgh Castle was formerly a township in Bambrough parish, from 1866 Bamburgh Castle was a civil parish in its own right until it was abolished on 1 April 1955 and merged with Bamburgh.

== In popular culture ==
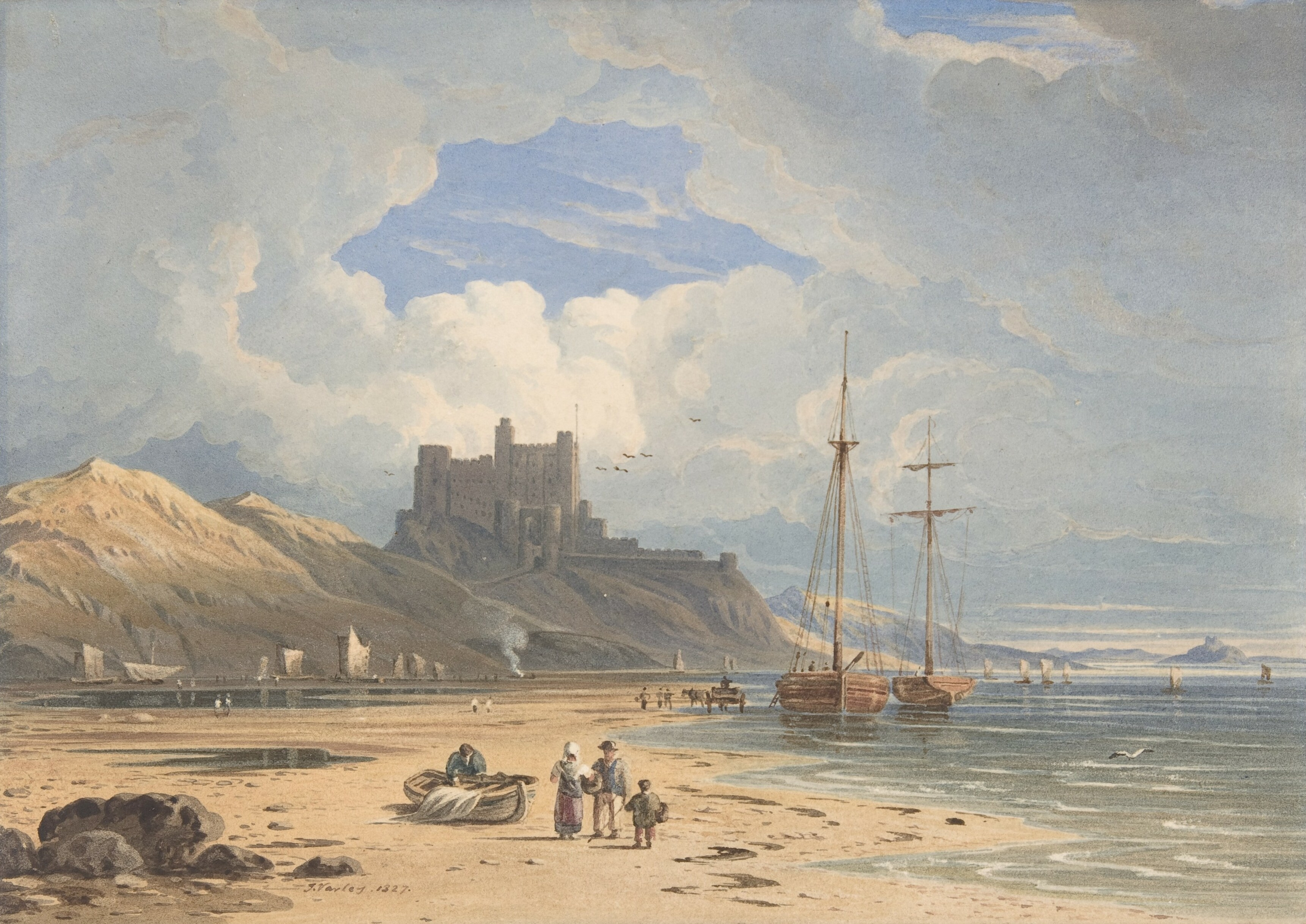
Bamborough Castle from the Northeast, with Holy Island in the Distance, Northumberland by John Varley (1827; Metropolitan Museum of Art)

=== Selected literary appearances ===
The castle features in the ballad The Laidly Worm of Spindleston Heugh written in circa 1270. Late medieval British author Thomas Malory identified Bamburgh Castle with Joyous Gard, the mythical castle home of Sir Lancelot in Arthurian legend.

In literature, Bamburgh, under its Saxon name Bebbanburg, is the home of Uhtred Uhtredson, the main character in Bernard Cornwell's The Saxon Stories. It features either as a significant location or as the inspiration for the protagonist in all books in the series, starting with The Last Kingdom, and the sequels The Pale Horseman, The Lords of the North, Sword Song, The Burning Land, Death of Kings, The Pagan Lord, The Empty Throne, Warriors of the Storm, The Flame Bearer, War of the Wolf, Sword of Kings and War Lord.

The castle and also the village provide the setting for the crime novel Bamburgh written by LJ Ross.

=== Selected media appearances ===
In addition to appearances as itself, for example in the TV show Most Haunted in 2006, and the 2018 racing game Forza Horizon 4, Bamburgh Castle has been used as a filming location for a number of television and film projects:

- 1927: Huntingtower
- 1949: A Connecticut Yankee in King Arthur's Court
- 1964: Becket
- 1971: The Devils
- 1971: Macbeth
- 1971: Mary, Queen of Scots
- 1982: Ivanhoe
- 1984–1986: Robin of Sherwood
- 1998: Elizabeth
- 2011: Channel 4's Time Team dig at Bamburgh Castle
- 2015: Macbeth (film)
- 2015: World's End (BBC TV series)
- 2018: The Last Kingdom (TV series)
- 2023: Indiana Jones and the Dial of Destiny

== Gallery ==
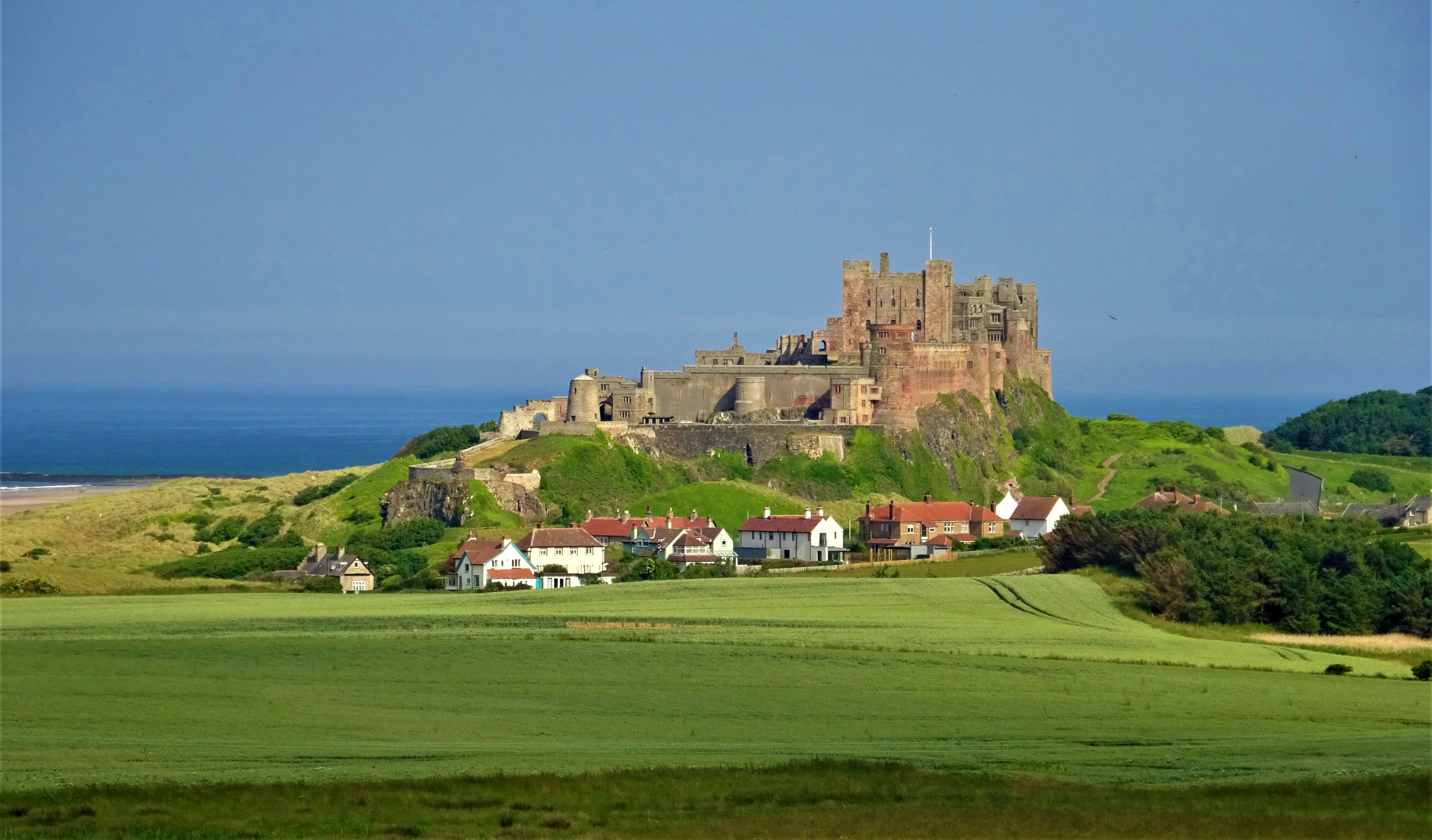

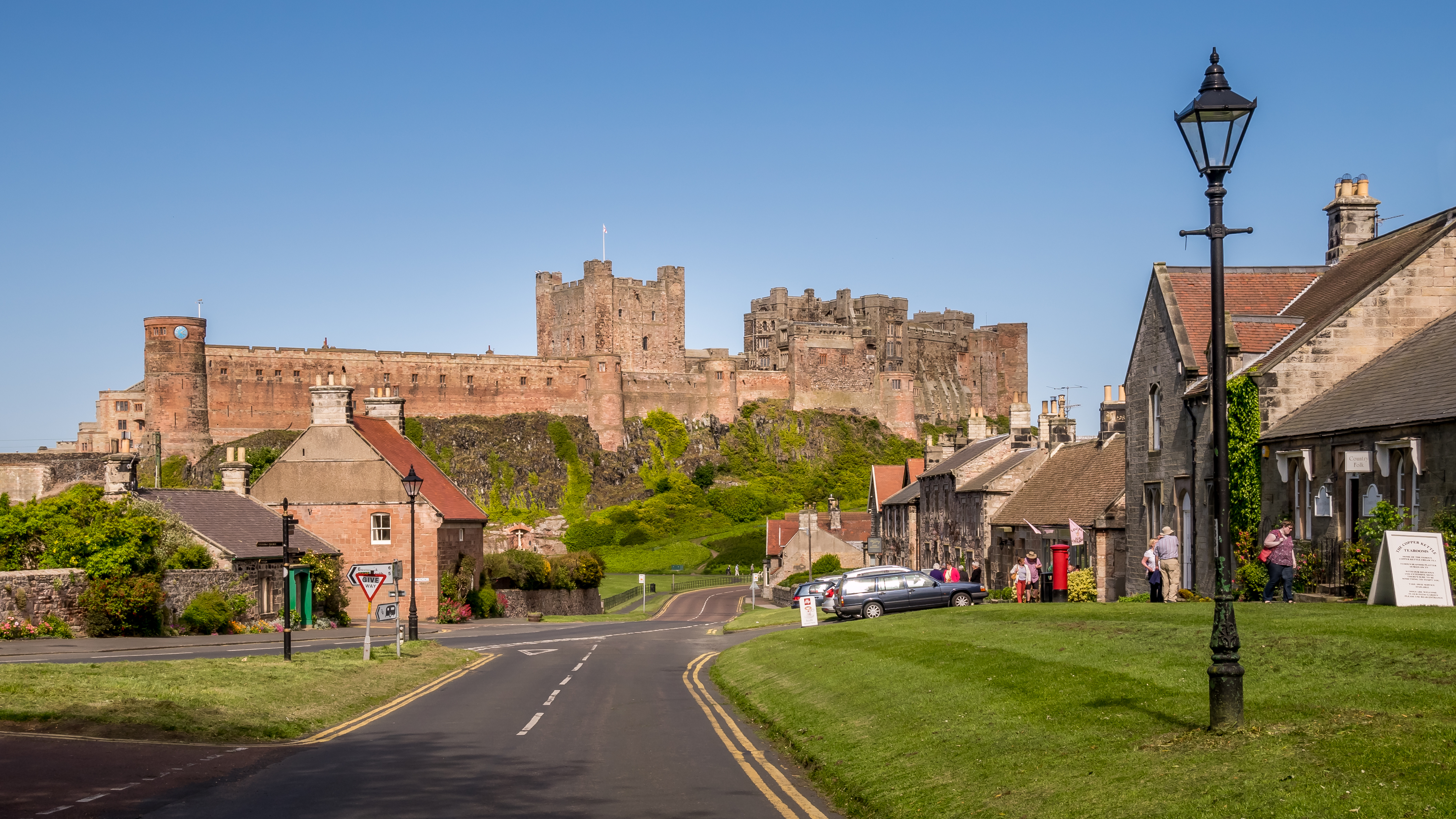

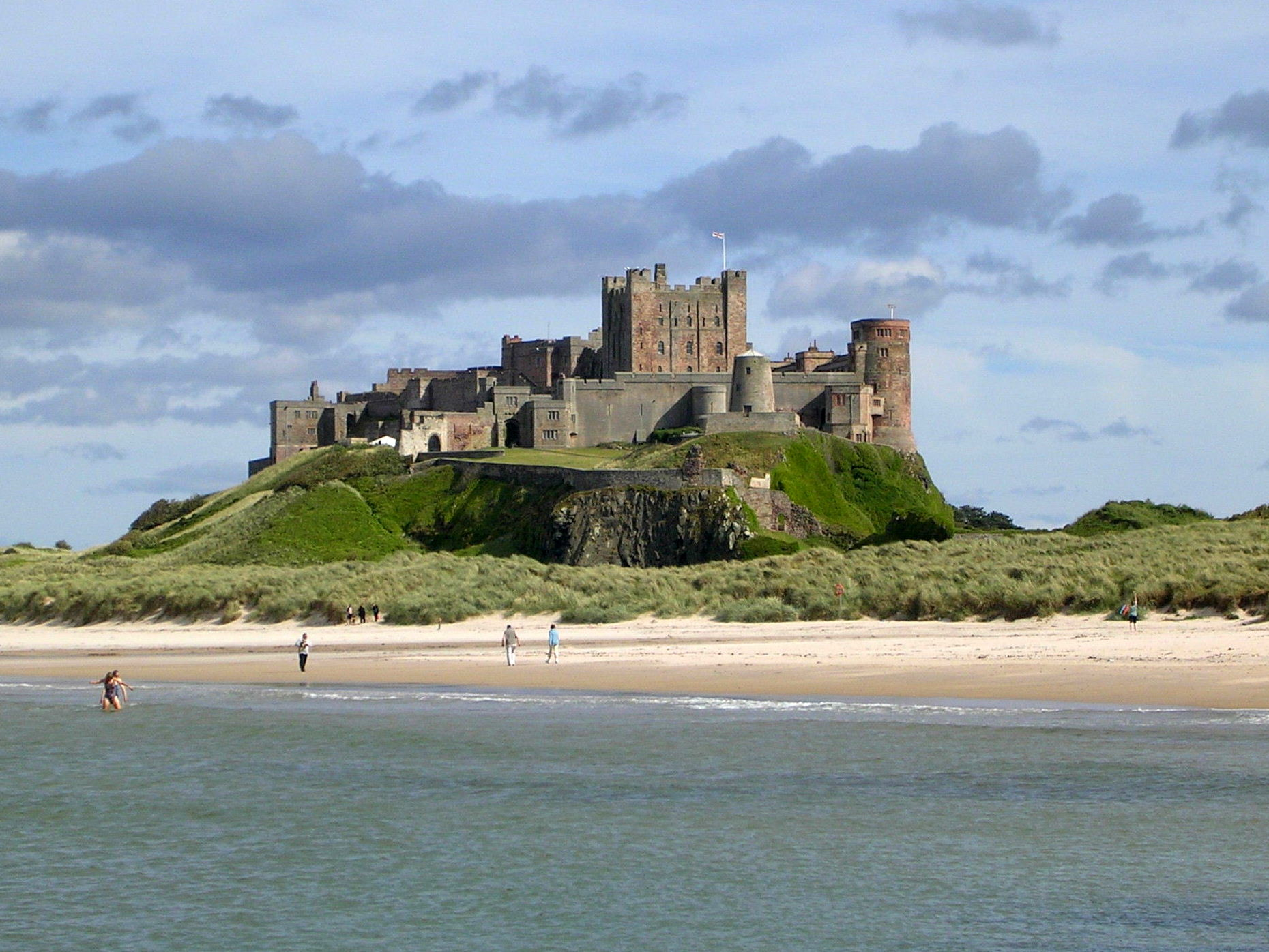

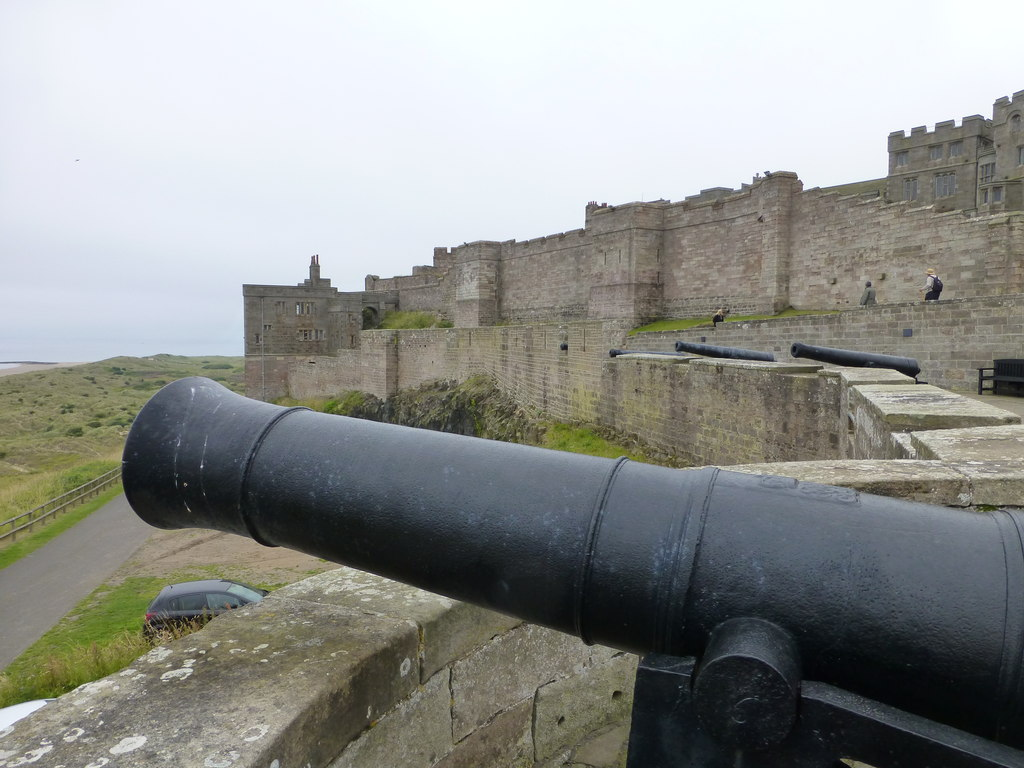

== See also ==
- Castles in Great Britain and Ireland
- Carrickfergus Castle
- Cragside
- Harlech Castle

== Sources ==
- Allsopp, Bruce; Clark, Ursula (1969). Historic Architecture of Northumberland. Newcastle upon Tyne: Oriel Press. ISBN 0 85362 062 8.
- Grundy, John (2022). History of Northumberland. Newcastle upon Tyne: Tyne Bridge Publishing. ISBN 9781838280970.
- Hope-Taylor, Brian (1977). Yeavering: an Anglo-British centre of early Northumbria. Stationery Office Books. ISBN 978-0116705525.
