= Bamburgh Sword =

Anglo-Saxons sword from the seventh century found at Bamburgh Castle in 1960

Coordinates: 55.60899°N 1.710155°W

- Type: Sword
- Place of origin: Northumbria

Production history
- Manufacturer: Unknown
- Produced: 7th century

Specifications
- Length: 76 centimetres (30 in)
- Blade type: Pattern welded

The Bamburgh Sword is an Anglo-Saxon artefact from the seventh century. It was uncovered during an archaeological excavation at Bamburgh Castle in 1960 by Brian Hope-Taylor. The sword was missing until his death in 2001, when it was found in a suitcase in his garage. It is unique amongst swords of its period, having been formed by six strands of iron pattern welded into a blade, resulting in speculation that it may have been the sword of a king.

== Description ==
The Bamburgh Sword is similar in size to a Roman spatha, and would have originally measured about 76 centimetres (30 in) in length. It is an Anglo-Saxon weapon which has been dated to the seventh century, and was likely to have been buried in either the tenth or eleventh centuries. It has a pattern welded blade which historians have identified by x-rays as being unique to the time period in that it uses six strands of iron to form the sword, when no other blades of that era were made of more than four strands. It would have taken a blacksmith around two months to create the blade; archaeologist Paul Gething said that to "produce a weapon of this calibre required state-of-the-art technology of the time, those who witnessed the creation of this weapon would have thought it the equivalent of magic."

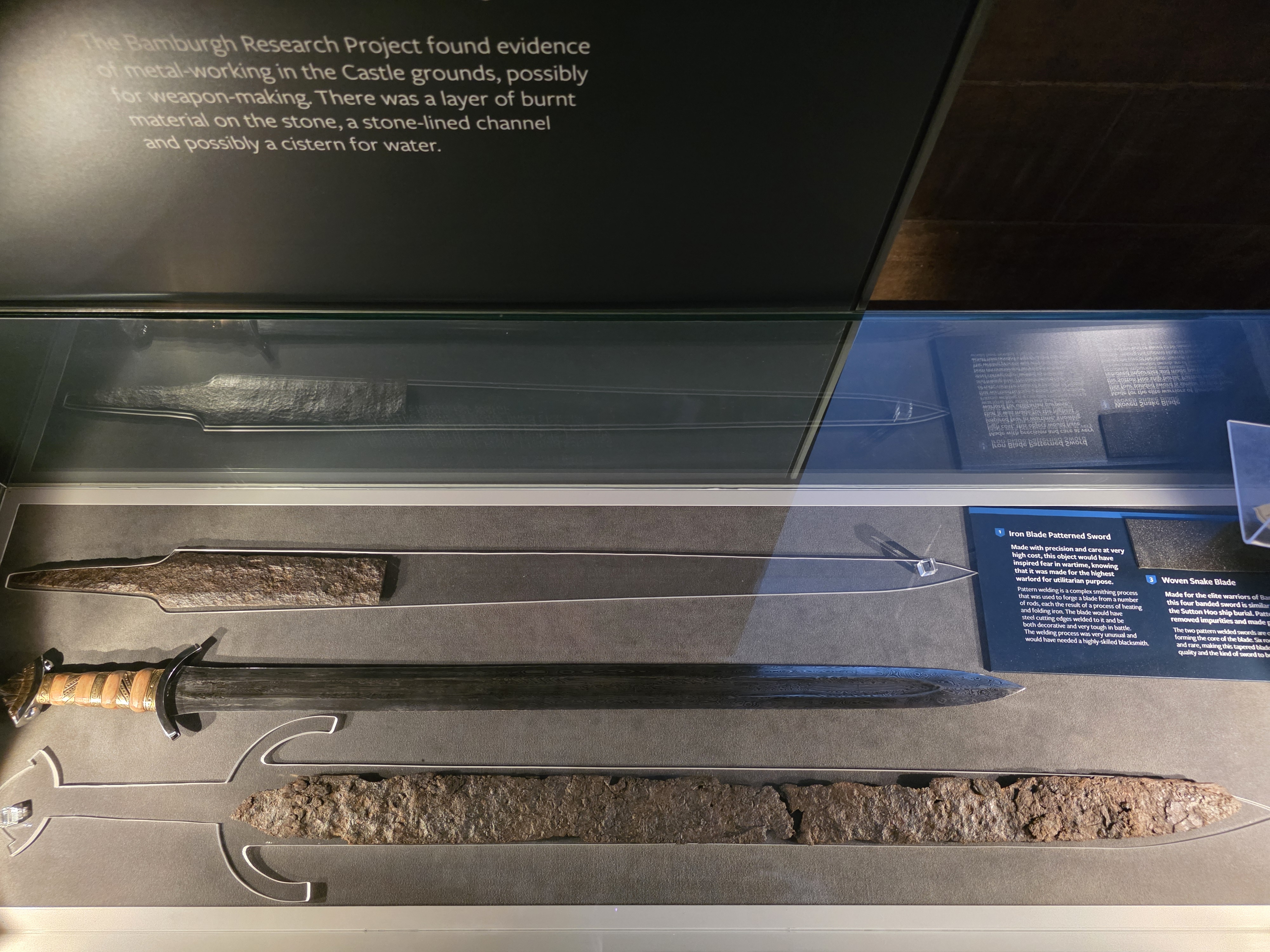
Remains of the Bamburgh Sword

The relative cost of the Bamburgh Sword during the era of its creation has led archaeologists to speculate that the original owner would have been either a king or a close associate, such as one of the king's favoured warriors, and may have possibly been the sword of King Oswald of Northumbria. The weapon would have been passed down a family line until its burial some three to four hundred years later.

=== Rediscovery ===
The sword was unearthed by Brian Hope-Taylor during a dig inside the walls of Bamburgh Castle, Northumberland, in 1960. However, the sword wasn't recognised and he took possession of the artefact. Following Hope-Taylor's death in 2001, a former PhD student of his was checking a consignment of items from Hope-Taylor's house that were due to be disposed of in a skip and found the sword. A number of students had visited their former professor's house only because they had heard that his books were being sold off. The sword had been stored inside a suitcase that was found in the garage.

After being researched by Royal Commission on the Ancient and Historical Monuments of Scotland, the sword was returned to the castle in 2005, and remains there on display.
