= Sorrel (disambiguation) =

Sorrel, Rumex acetosa, is a perennial herb cultivated as a leaf vegetable.

Sorrel may also refer to:

== Plants ==
- Averrhoa bilimbi or tree sorrel, a fruit-bearing tree
- Oxalidaceae, family of plants known as the woodsorrel family
- Oxalis, largest genus in the Oxalidaceae, known as woodsorrels, particularly:
  - Oxalis enneaphylla, scurvy-grass sorrel
  - Oxalis oregana, redwood sorrel
- Oxyria digyna, alpine sorrel or mountain sorrel
- Roselle (plant) (Hibiscus sabdariffa), known as Jamaican sorrel, and in the Caribbean simply as "sorrel"
- Rumex, genus of plants containing species known as sorrels, particularly:
  - Rumex acetosella, sheep's sorrel
  - Rumex rugosus, wrinkled sorrel
  - Rumex scutatus, French sorrel
- Sourwood or sorrel tree (Oxydendrum arboreum), a tree native to North America

== Characters ==
- Hetty Sorrel, a fictional character in George Eliot's novel Adam Bede
- Sorel Bliss, a character in Noël Coward's 1924 play Hay Fever
- Sorrel, a character in the animated film Pokémon the Movie: I Choose You!

== People ==
- Moxley Sorrel (1838–1901), American Civil War soldier
- Sorrel Carson (1920–2005), Irish actress, director, and teacher who formed the Academy of Live and Recorded Art in London
- Sorrel Hays (1941–2020), American pianist, composer, and artist

== Places ==
- Sorell, Tasmania, Australia
- Sorrel, Louisiana, United States, a census-designated place

== Other ==
- Sorrel (drink) or hibiscus tea, a herbal tea infusion popular in Jamaica
- Sorrel (horse), an alternative term for a reddish-colored horse, more often known as "chestnut"
  - Old Sorrel (foaled 1915), an America Quarter Horse stallion
- Sorrel (restaurant), a restaurant in San Francisco, United States
- Heliophorus sena or sorrel sapphire, an Indian butterfly
- USS Sorrel (1864), an American navy ship

== See also ==
- Sea sorrel (disambiguation)
- Rosalie Sorrels (1933–2017), American singer-songwriter
- Sorel (disambiguation)
- Sorell (disambiguation)
- Sorrell (disambiguation)
