= Sorel Cohen =

Canadian photographer and visual artist

- Born: 1936 (age 89–90); Montreal, Quebec, Canada
- Education: Concordia University
- Movement: conceptual art, feminist art
- Awards: Duke and Duchess of York Prize in Photography, 1988
- Website: https://sorel-cohen.squarespace.com/

Sorel Cohen is a Canadian photographer and visual artist currently living and working in Montreal, Quebec, Canada. She was represented by Donald Browne Gallery in Montreal until the gallery closed its doors in 2016.

== Biography ==
Sorel Cohen was born in 1936, in Montreal, Quebec, to parents of Ukrainian and Polish descent. Cohen pursued post-secondary education in Montreal, earning a Bachelor of Fine Arts from Concordia University in 1974, as well as a Masters of Fine Arts in 1979. Her Masters thesis examined feminist influences on art in the 1970s, and her work has continued to be shaped by her feminist values.

Her fonds is held by the National Gallery of Canada.

== Style ==
Sorel Cohen has worked extensively with portraiture, both behind and in front of the camera. The majority of her work has a focus on both autobiographical works as well as feminist works. In the 1970s, Cohen began experimenting by combining photography with performance art, which was a relatively new idea at the time and soon became known for this. Cohen often combines the use of this performance art with a slow shutter speed, creating a blurred aesthetic. By displaying these photographs in a series, the viewer feels a sense of time passing through them. Cohen draws inspiration from all forms of art, from painting to sculpture, to performance in her photographic work. Although Cohen's work comes from personal experience, she gives her photographs a quality that allows for interpretation, giving them an almost universal meaning. Cohen has produced an extensive collection of work that comes from a perspective of psychoanalysis.

== Photographic themes ==
=== Feminism ===
Cohen’s feminist stance in her art was triggered by an interview between Lucy Lippard and Judy Chicago which she read in Artforum. She explains in her master’s thesis: "I realized then, that if I was going to be making artworks for the rest of my life it had better have something to do with me as a person, and in particular, as a woman." Cohen used photography to combat stereotypes of women, as well as subvert society's beliefs around a what a woman's role is. By placing herself both behind and in front of the camera, Cohen presents a commentary on the representation of women in these roles.

=== Absence and psychoanalysis ===
A published book featuring her work Divans maudits (with a text by Gérard Wacjman) shows how Cohen was strongly influenced by psychoanalytical perspectives. Some her most well-known work features primarily empty beds and couches. The photographs carry another strong theme that is found in many of Cohen’s works as well, the theme/idea of absence. By photographing these empty couches and beds, objects that are primarily only seen as important when they are full of people or things, Cohen aims to capture what is missing.

== Notable works and collections ==
=== The Grid (1975-1976) ===
This series of muslin sculptures echoes the grid as an emblem of modernism. The handcrafted quality of the fabric sculptures however recalls traditional women's work and defies the modernist and masculine pursuit of uniformity and repetition. From the sculptures in The Grid series, the artist also creates contact prints on canvas using techniques such as cyanotype and Van Dyke brown. When sewn together, these prints replicate the sculptural works in a 1:1 scale, resembling a "shadow". This series thus marks a transition between the artist's sculptural and photographic practice.

=== Le rite matinal (1977) ===
In 1977, Cohen begins a series of works (color photographs, video, cyanotypes) based on the action of making a bed. Among these, the series of photographs Le rite matinal shows the artist performing this action repeatedly in front of the camera with an impression of movement obtained by a slow shutter speed and a long exposure time. By performing this banal action in front of the camera, the artist links women's domestic work with their artistic work, often neglected in art history.

=== The Shape of a Gesture (1978) ===
The series The Shape of a Gesture (originally titled Domestic Activity as Painterly Gesture) shows the artist in action as she cleans a window with a colored cloth. This work refers to abstract expressionist painting by substituting the flat surface of the painting with that of the window and subverting the painterly gesture through a domestic activity traditionally reserved for women.

=== After Bacon / Muybridge (1980) ===
In After Bacon / Muybridge, Cohen looks at the work of painter Francis Bacon (artist) and uses photographic methods, such as long exposure and slow shutter speed to achieve a blurred effect. In this collection, Cohen also references the work of Eadweard Muybridge, who pioneered the study of motion in photography. Cohen appropriates these works from major male figures in art history from a feminist perspective in a way that is reminiscent of the conceptual work of Sherrie Levine around the same time.

=== An Extended and Continuous Metaphor (1983-1986) ===
With the series An Extended and Continuous Metaphor, Cohen abandons the sequential or grid form in favor of hierarchically organized polyptychs, some reminiscent of Flemish altarpieces. The photographs show the artist simultaneously performing the roles of artist, model, and viewer through multiple exposures in an all-black space. This non-space refers to an idealized conception of the artist's studio: to that effect, the title of the series alludes to the painting The Painter's Studio: A real allegory summing up seven years of my artistic and moral life by Gustave Courbet (1855).

=== Wounds of Experience (1995–1996) ===
This collection features a series of nine photographs exploring themes of absence and the relationship between psychoanalyst and patient, through depictions of psychoanalyst offices.

=== Divans Dolorosa (2008) ===
This collection features photographs of empty psychoanalyst consultation rooms of in Quebec. The focus of these photographs are the empty couches (or divans), allowing Cohen to present the idea of absence as something that is wholly present in the scene. Like Wounds of Experience this series is characterized by the inclusion of text, with words inscribed below each of the photographs referring to different symptoms as described by psychoanalysts.

=== Lacrimosa (2010) ===
Presented as a sequel to Divans Dolorosa, this collection features photographs of handkerchiefs with psychoanalytical descriptions attached to them.

== Exhibitions ==
Sorel Cohen has had her work exhibited both nationally and internationally over the past three decades. Her work has been featured in both solo and group exhibitions.

=== Solo exhibitions ===
==== Canada ====
Year	Gallery	City
1977	Galerie Mira Godard	Montreal, Quebec
1979	Nova Gallery	Vancouver, British Columbia
1980	Eye Level Gallery	Halifax, Nova Scotia
	Mercer Union	Toronto, Ontario
1981	Agnes Etherington Art Centre, Queen's University	Kingston, Ontario
1983	Galerie Optica	Montreal, Quebec
	S.L. Simpson Gallery	Toronto, Ontario
1984	Southern Alberta Art Gallery	Lethbridge, Alberta
1986	Musée d'art contemporain de Montréal	Montreal, Quebec
1987	Presentation House Gallery	North Vancouver, British Columbia
1988	Toronto Photographer's Workshop	Toronto, Ontario
1989	Wynick/Tuck Gallery	Toronto, Ontario
1990	Dazibao	Montreal, Quebec
1991	Wynick/Tuck Gallery	Toronto, Ontario
1992	Galerie Samuel Lallouz	Montreal, Quebec
1993	Wynick/Tuck Gallery	Toronto, Ontario
	Galerie Vu	Quebec, Quebec
1996	Galerie Samuel Lallouz	Montreal, Quebec
1997	Wynick/Tuck Gallery	Toronto, Ontario
1999	La Tranchefile	Montreal, Quebec
2000	The Koffler Gallery	Toronto, Ontario
2004	Dazibao	Montreal, Quebec
2008, 2010	Galerie Donald Browne	Montreal, Quebec
2021	VOX, centre de l'image contemporaine	Montréal, Québec

==== International ====
Year	Gallery	City/Country
1981	49th Parallel	New York, New York, US
1983	Institute for Art and Urban Resources, MoMA PS1	New York, New York, US
1984	Services culturels du Quebec	Paris, France
1985	Northlight Gallery, Arizona State University	Tempe, Arizona, US
1994	Les Ateliers Nadar	Marseilles, France
2003	Centre culturel canadien	Paris, France

=== Group exhibitions ===
==== Canada ====
Year	Exhibition	Gallery	City
1973	Les moins de 35 ans	Saidye Bronfman Centre / Galerie de la SAPQ / Casa Loma / Galerie Espace / Média-Gravures / Musée du Québec / Pavillon Pierre-Boucher, UQTR	Montréal / Quebec / Trois-Rivières, Quebec
1975	ARTFEMME'75	Saidye Bronfman Centre / Musée d'art contemporain de Montréal / Powerhouse	Montreal, Quebec
1982	Art et féminisme	Musée d’art contemporain de Montréal	Montreal, Quebec
1983	Photographie actuelle au Québec	Saidye Bronfman Centre	Montreal, Quebec
1984	L'Art pensé, Congrés international d'esthétique	Université de Montréal	Montreal, Quebec
	Edge and Image	Concordia University Art Gallery	Montreal, Quebec
	Production and Axis of Sexuality	Walter Phillips Gallery	Banff, Alberta
	Reflections	National Gallery of Canada	Ottawa, Ontario
1986	Songs of Experience	National Gallery of Canada	Ottawa, Ontario
1989	Taking Pictures	Presentation House Gallery	North Vancouver, British Columbia
	Le geste oublié	Musée d'art contemporain de Montréal	Montreal, Quebec
	Incorporation	Galerie d'art Lavalin	Montreal, Quebec
1989-1990	The Zone of Conventional Practice and Other Real Stories	Galerie Optica	Montreal, Quebec (travelling)
1991	Un archipel de désir: les artistes du Québec et la scene internationale	Musée du Québec	Quebec, Quebec
	Practicing Beauty	Art Gallery of Hamilton	Hamilton, Ontario
1992	Exposition rétrospective	Galerie Optica	Montreal, Quebec
1993	The Historic Female	Galerie 111	Montreal, Quebec
	Empowering the World	Carleton University Art Gallery	Ottawa, Ontario
1994	Quotation	Winnipeg Art Gallery	Winnipeg, Manitoba
	Contemporary Canadian Works	The Art Gallery of North York	Toronto, Ontario
1996	Found Missing: Archival Photographs and the New Historicity	Gallery 44	Toronto, Ontario
1997	Here's Looking at Me Kid	Art Gallery of North York	Toronto, Ontario
1998	The Word in Art	Art Gallery of North York	Toronto, Ontario
2012	Art Histories	VOX, centre de l'image contemporaine	Montreal, Quebec
2016-2017	Elles Photographes	Montreal Museum of Fine Arts	Montreal, Quebec
2017	Photography in Canada: 1960–2000	National Gallery of Canada	Ottawa, Ontario

==== International ====
Year	Exhibition	Gallery	City/Country
1983	New Images: Contemporary Quebec Photography	49th Parallel Gallery	New York, New York, US
1985	Visual Facts: Photography and Video by Nine Canadian Artists	Third Eye Centre	Glasgow, Scotland (travelling)
1986	50 Years of Modern Colour Photography, 1936-1986	Photokina	Cologne, Germany
	Doppleganger/Cover	Aorta Gallery	Amsterdam, Holland
1987	Figures	The Cambridge Darkroom	England (travelling)
1989	Montréal '89	CREDAC	Ivry-sur-Seine, France
1990	Odalesque	Jayne Baum Gallery	New York, New York, US
1991	The Photographic Image: Photo-Based Works	49th Parallel Gallery	New York, New York, US
1997	a little object	Centre for Freudian Analysis and Research	London, England
	Virtue and Vice: Derivations of Allegory in Contemporary Photography	International Photography Research; Site Gallery	Amsterdam, the Netherlands; Sheffield, England (travelling)
2008	Wild Signals	Württembergischer Kunstverein Stuttgart	Stuttgart, Germany

== Awards ==
Sorel Cohen was awarded the prestigious Duke and Duchess of York Photography Prize, by the Canada Council in 1988.

== Related activities ==
Sorel Cohen has been a member of various arts councils throughout her career. Most notably the Canada Council for the Arts, from 1990-1997. Cohen was also Ministère des Affaires culturelles du Québec in 1992. From 1979-1989 Cohen was a member of the Board of Directors for the Galerie Optica in Montreal. Cohen has been a guest lecturer at various Canadian Universities.
