= Doris McCarthy =

Canadian artist (1910–2010)

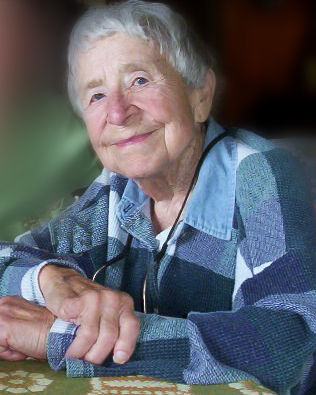
- Born: Doris Jean McCarthy; July 7, 1910; Calgary, Alberta, Canada
- Died: November 25, 2010 (aged 100); Toronto, Ontario, Canada
- Education: University of Toronto (BA)
- Occupations: Painter, teacher

Doris McCarthy, CM OOnt RCA LL. D. (July 7, 1910 – November 25, 2010) was a Canadian artist known for her semi-abstracted landscapes. In a 2004 interview with Harold Klunder, the artist remarked:

I was influenced very strongly by the tradition of going out into nature and painting what was there. I bought it. And I still buy it.

== Life and career ==
Born in Calgary, Alberta, McCarthy attended the Ontario College of Art from 1926 to 1930, where she was awarded various scholarships and prizes. She became a teacher shortly thereafter and taught at Central Technical School in downtown Toronto from 1933 until she retired in 1972. She spent most of her life living and working in Scarborough (now a Toronto district), Ontario, though she travelled abroad extensively and painted the landscapes of various countries, influenced by Lawren Harris's simplification of form. The countries she visited included: Costa Rica, Spain, Italy, Japan, India, England, and Ireland. McCarthy was nonetheless probably best known for her Canadian landscapes and her depictions of Arctic icebergs – she began visiting the Arctic in 1972. In 1989, she graduated from the University of Toronto with a B.A. in English after studying on its Scarborough campus.

McCarthy's work has been exhibited and collected extensively in Canada and abroad, in both public and private art galleries including: the National Gallery of Canada, the Art Gallery of Ontario, The Doris McCarthy Gallery at the Scarborough campus of the University of Toronto with over 200 of her works, and Wynick/Tuck Gallery.

In 2004, she had a gallery named in her honour at the Scarborough campus of the University of Toronto. Doris McCarthy trail runs alongside Bellamy Ravine, connecting Bellehaven Crescent to Lake Ontario.

== Death and legacy ==
She died on November 25, 2010.

== Publications and films ==
McCarthy penned three autobiographies, chronicling the various stages of her life: A Fool in Paradise (Toronto: MacFarlane, Walter & Ross, 1990), The Good Wine (Toronto: MacFarlane, Walter & Ross, 1991), and Ninety Years Wise (Toronto: Second Story Press, 2004). She was made a member of the Royal Canadian Academy of Arts. She was the subject of the award-winning documentary film by Wendy Wacko entitled "Doris McCarthy: Heart of a Painter".

== Awards and honours ==
She was the recipient of the Order of Ontario, the Order of Canada, honorary degrees from the University of Calgary, the University of Toronto, Trent University, the University of Alberta, and Nipissing University, and an honorary fellowship from the Ontario College of Art and Design.
