= ACE Cultural Tours =

Travel and holiday companies of the United Kingdom

Coordinates: 52.142654°N 0.155024°E

ACE Cultural Tours is an operator of educational and cultural travel tours. Specialising in small group tours with expert leaders such as Humphrey Burton, Andrew Wilson, Colin Bailey, Michael Nicholson and Julian C. Richards, the organisation provides tours in the UK, Europe and across the globe. The tours cover a variety of subjects and include cultural cruises as well as natural history courses and music festivals. In 2009, a series of European tours was devised in partnership with English Heritage.

== Owner ==
ACE Cultural Tours is owned by the ACE Foundation, an educational charity which forms links with the countries visited by ACE Cultural Tours by supporting local educational projects and providing scholarships. ACE Cultural Tours currently conducts operations in over 50 countries worldwide.

== History ==
The company was founded in 1958 by Philip Brooke Barnes as The Association for Cultural Exchange and is currently based in Babraham, Cambridge, England. The company was inspired by Philip Brooke Barnes's visits to India during his time with the Intelligence Corps and by time he had spent in Scandinavia. The founding members of the organisation were Barnes, Tony Crowe, James Hockey (both of the Farnham School of Art, now the University for the Creative Arts) and Professor John Evans (Director of the Institute of Archaeology, London). In its early years, ACE mainly provided courses for student and professional groups coming to Britain from abroad, particularly, but not exclusively, from the United States and Scandinavia. One of the first summer schools, entitled Tradition and Experiment in British Society, held at Exeter College, Oxford, included a keynote speech by Clement Attlee.

In 1964, archaeology became of greater significance within the organisation and Mr Barnes was able to arrange placements on excavations for students from England in Denmark and students from Denmark on digs in England. In 1967, the National Trust commissioned ACE to devise a programme for Czechoslovak conservationists to visit country houses and national parks in England and Wales. The reciprocal British group scheduled to visit Czechoslovakia on a similar programme was unable to do so because of the Warsaw Pact invasion of Czechoslovakia in 1968. Programmes with the National Trust in England, and the equivalent organisation in Denmark, continued into the early seventies. On one occasion, tour participants were personally shown around the royal summer palace at Sofiero Castle by the King of Sweden, Gustav VI Adolf. The first musical appreciation course was held in 1970 at Merton College, Oxford, and was directed by the musicologist Denis Stevens. The music courses expanded to include festivals, such as the Three Choirs Festival, in the 1980s.

Following his retirement as Director of Norwich Museum, Francis Cheetham lectured extensively for ACE between 1993 and 2006. The ACE Foundation co-published two books written by Cheetham, an expert on Medieval alabasters, The Alabaster Images of Medieval England and English Medieval Alabasters: With a Catalogue of the Collection in the Victoria and Albert Museum.

In 1992, Philip Brooke Barnes handed over the administration of ACE to his son Hugh Brooke Barnes who had worked with the company for eight years previously, and his son Paul became General Secretary in 2002 having worked as his assistant since 1998.
