= Elizabeth Sorrell =

British painter

Elizabeth Sorrell, née Tanner (1916–1991) was a British water-colour painter. Her work was a combination of technique with attention to detail, whether she was observing the natural world, or the textural quality of lace, silk, porcelain. “In earlier years, I painted a good deal outdoors, but as circumstances compelled me to be indoors more than out, I have more recently found my self evolving a sort of animated still-life picture”. She developed Rheumatoid arthritis in her late 40s, but managed to carry on working to the highest standard until the very end of her life using the finest 000 brushes which she had to hold between her thumb and second finger. In 1979 John Stanton Ward RA wrote of her:

"When she was at the Royal College of Art, Elizabeth Sorrell sought out Professor Tristram, the greatest authority on medieval art, and persuaded him to let her spend most of her time in the mural painting department. Here she came across and was encouraged by Paul Nash. One might speculate whether the Tristram contact was the beginning of her interest in medieval art, since she resolutely claims to be of the English School of Watercolourists. And this she sees as going back to medieval times, to the illuminated manuscripts of the 12th and 13th Centuries. For some time now it has been clear that she is one of the finest and most original watercolourists working today".

== Early life ==
Her early years were spent in a mining village in North Yorkshire, but her family moved to Eastbourne when she was eight. She studied at Eastbourne School of Art (1934-8) and the Royal College of Art (1938–41), and was part of the group of students who were evacuated to Ambleside in 1940. She was awarded many scholarships, diplomas and medals, including a travelling scholarship to Paris and Italy (1937), Federation of British Industry Award First Prize (1940), and a RCA gold medal for work of special distinction (1941). Her painting Troops In Ambleside (1941) is in the collection of the Wordsworth Trust.

== Career ==
After leaving art school she worked for a time in an armaments factory, and then at Blackpool School of Art (1942-5). Post war she initially worked as a designer of wallpapers for Arthur Sanders & Son Ltd Sandersons, before concentrating only on watercolour painting, and she was elected a member of the Royal Watercolour Society in 1958. She was a regular exhibitor at the Royal Academy Summer Exhibition at the Royal Academy of Arts from the 1950s until her death, and her works can be seen in various collections including the Beecroft Art Gallery, Southend, Chelmsford Museum, The Tate Gallery, the Graves Art Gallery Sheffield, the Towner Art Gallery, Eastbourne, the Harris Museum, Preston, the Chelmsford Museum and Art Gallery, the Newport Museum and Art Gallery, the Hove Museum of Art as well as many private collections. She was awarded a Civil List pension (1977) and a Silver Jubilee Award (1979).

== Family life ==
She married the artist Alan Sorrell in 1947 and they moved to Southeast Essex where they converted a small chapel into a home and studio, and where they raised a family of three children, Richard Sorrell and Julia Sorrell both being artists, and Mark Sorrell being a writer.
