= Julia Sorrell =

British artist (born 1955)

Julia Sorrell (born 4 August 1955, in Westcliff-on-Sea, Essex) is a British artist known for her portraits and imaginative drawings and paintings using figures and natural forms such as wood, shells, rock and plants using a range of media from pencil, charcoal, pen & ink, pastel, watercolour and oil. She lives in Oxfordshire and exhibits in London at the Mall Galleries as a member of the Royal Institute of Painters in Water Colours.

== Early life ==
Sorrell was born in Westcliff-on-Sea, Essex, the daughter of the artist Alan Sorrell (1904–1974) and the watercolourist Elizabeth Sorrell (1916–1991). She grew up in a converted chapel in Daws Heath, southeast Essex, surrounded by trees and woodlands which were to be an inspiration for her later work.

== Career ==
She studied textiles and embroidery under Constance Howard MBE at Goldsmiths' College (1973–6) who purchased her work to use as examples in talks and publications. She was taught drawing by Betty Swanwick RA (who was to produce the artwork for albums by rock group Genesis), and she sold her first work at the Royal Academy Summer Exhibition at the age of 19. Following the death of her father, she turned more towards drawing and painting, and gained a place at the Royal Academy of Arts(1978–81). Whilst a student there her self-portrait gained second prize in the first National Portrait Gallery Portrait Award, 1980, now known as the BP Portrait Award. This led to a series of portrait commissions including one from the National Portrait Gallery to paint Michael Ramsey, the ex-Archbishop of Canterbury. Her letters describing this experience were borrowed by Michael Ramsey's biographer Owen Chadwick who then passed them on to the library of Lambeth Palace.

In the 1990s she exhibited at the Maas Gallery with the dealer Rupert Maas, and had a series of paintings purchased by the collector Professor Philip Rieff which were then exhibited at the Philadelphia Museum of Art in 1996. A decade later she was exhibiting with Waterhouse and Dodd, Cork Street.

She was elected a member of the Royal Institute of Painters in Water Colours in 2008, the Royal Society of British Artists in 2009, and the Norwich Twenty Group in 2010. In 2015 she was awarded the first TravelArt Award from the ACE Foundation ACE Cultural Tours, and asked to go to Orkney to produce an exhibition of work under the title: “Wild and Ancient Orkney”. The work concentrated on the coastal landscape features and archaeology, and was exhibited first at Abbott and Holder, in London (2016), and then at the McDonald Institute for Archaeological Research, Cambridge. For the final exhibition at Stapleford Granary, Cambridge ACE Cultural Tours, Julia produced her unique over 2m tall hand-embroidered sculpture “Reverence” using hand spun Orkney wool.

Her work is in the collections of the Beecroft Art Gallery, the Chelmsford Museum, Reading Museum, New Hall Art Collection, Laporte plc, The ACE Foundation at Stapleford Granary, Cambridge ACE Cultural Tours, The McDonald Institute for Archaeological Research, Cambridge and Clare Hall, Cambridge.

== Writings ==
She has written articles frequently about her own work and that of her father Alan Sorrell for The Artist, British Archaeology Magazine, Current Archaeology, Minerva (archaeology magazine), and Antiquity (journal). In 2014 she was commissioned by Oxbow Books, to write a biography of her father Alan Sorrell.
