= Alan Sorrell =

British artist and writer (1904–1974)

- Born: Alan Ernest Sorrell; 11 February 1904; Tooting, London, England
- Died: 21 December 1974 (aged 70); Southend-on-Sea, Essex, England
- Education: The Royal College of Art
- Known for: Watercolour, Archaeological illustration
- Movement: Neo-romanticism
- Elected: Royal Watercolour Society

Alan Ernest Sorrell (11 February 1904 – 21 December 1974) was an English artist and writer best remembered for his archaeological illustrations, particularly his detailed reconstructions of Roman Britain. He was a Senior Assistant Instructor of Drawing at The Royal College of Art, between 1931–39 and 1946–48. In 1937 he was elected a member of the Royal Watercolour Society.

== Early life ==
Sorrell was born in Tooting, London, and moved to Southend, Essex, at the age of two. The son and second child of Ernest Thomas Sorrell (1861–1910), a jeweller and watchmaker, and his wife Edith Jane Sorrell, née Doody (1867–1951), Alan Sorrell would often go with his father on trips away drawing landscapes as a child. However, most of his childhood was spent confined to a bath chair due to a suspected heart condition. The early death of his father also resulted in Sorrell's being very reclusive.

== Early career ==
Sorrell trained at the Southend municipal school of art and, after a brief spell as a commercial artist in London, he attended the Royal College of Art between 1924 and 1927. Whilst there, he met William Rothenstein who would act as a mentor for Sorrell and became a close friend. In 1928, Sorrell won the British Prix de Rome in Mural painting and spent the next three years at the British School at Rome.

Sorrell returned to England in 1931 and became drawing master at the Royal College of Art where his contemporaries included Gilbert Spencer. He began his archaeological reconstruction drawings after a chance meeting in 1936 with Kathleen Kenyon on a dig of a Roman site in Leicester, who asked him to produce illustrations for her article for The Illustrated London News. More commissions then followed at Maiden Castle, in collaboration with Mortimer Wheeler, and at Roman Caerwent and Carleon, in collaboration with Cyril Fox and V. E. Nash-Williams of the National Museum of Wales.

== World War Two ==
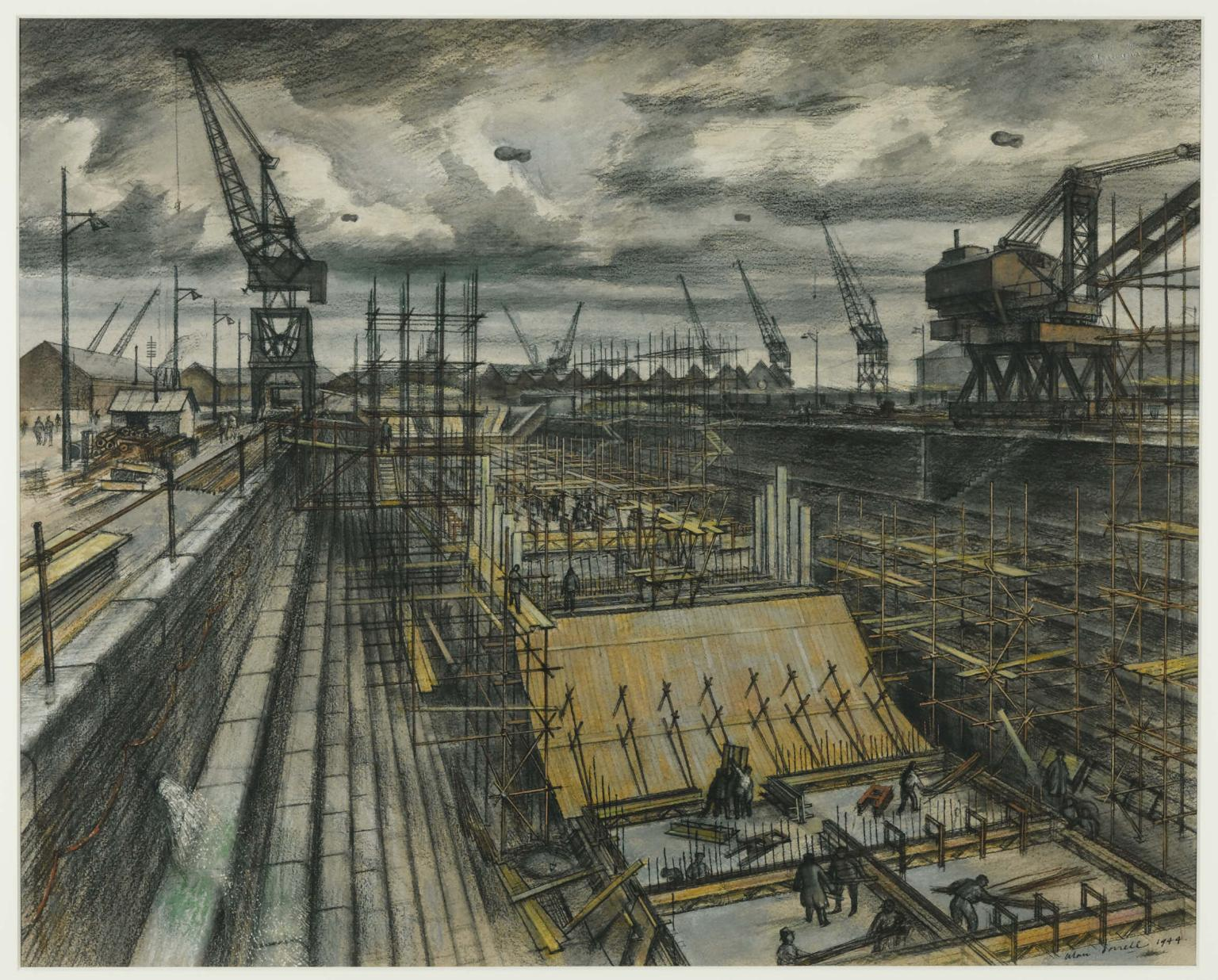
Southampton Dock, 1944 (Tate)

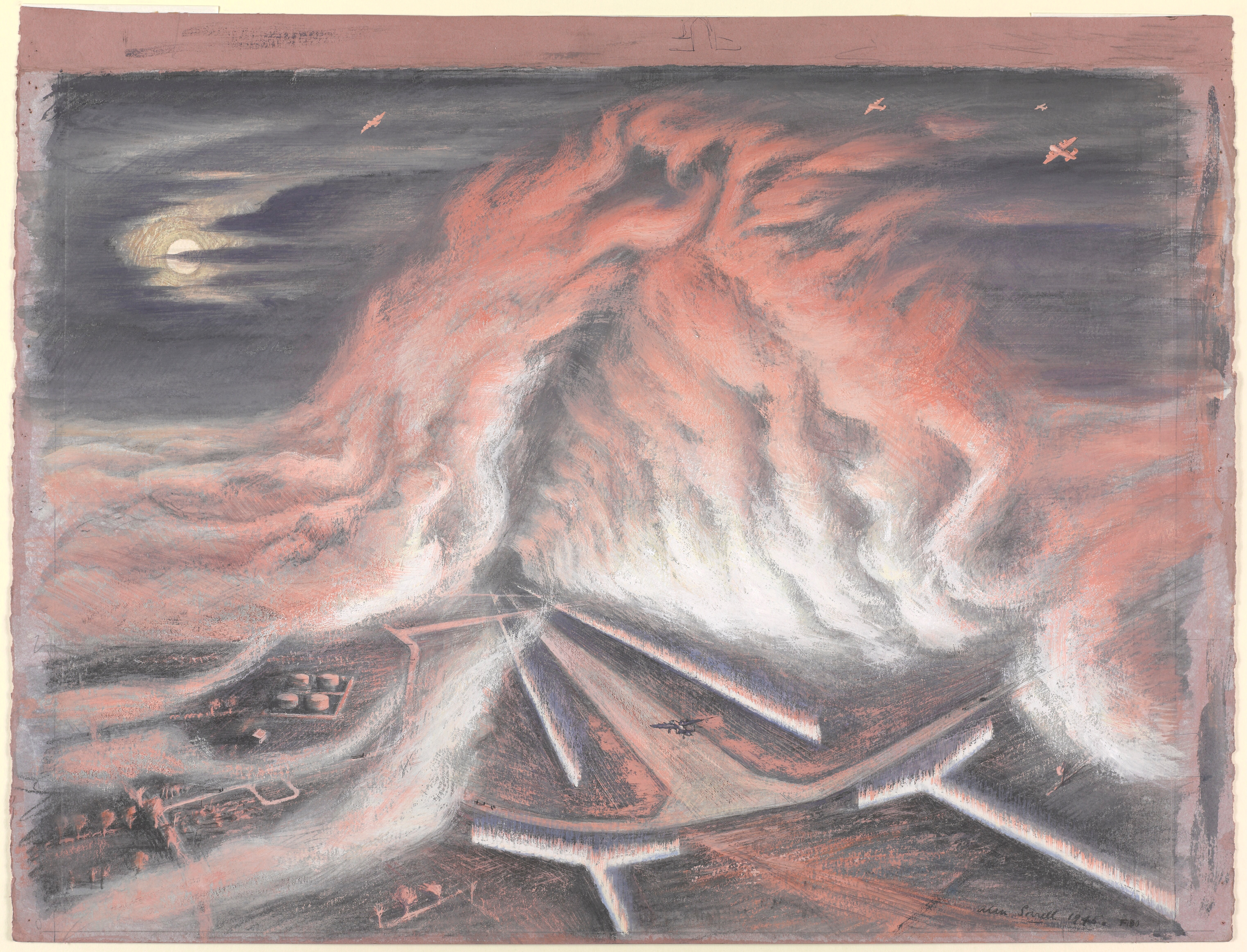
FIDO in Operation, 1945 (Art.IWM ART LD 5593)

During World War II, Sorrell worked in the Royal Air Force in 1940, and then was transferred to the Air Ministry in 1941, applying his artistic talents to help camouflage aerodromes. For a time he worked in the high security Central Intelligence unit at RAF Medmenham, where he was part of a team working on terrain models for bombing missions, and on models of battleships, such as the German battleship Tirpitz. Sorrell later claimed that he had refused to work on terrain models of cities he thought were of "irreplaceable artistic importance". He created artworks of air force life in his spare time as well as completing several short-term commissions from the War Artists' Advisory Committee, WAAC, to depict airfields and runway construction. In total WAAC acquired some 26 paintings from Sorrell.

== Post-war career in archaeology ==
After the war Sorrell's archaeological work was to take up more and more of his time. Commissions came from archaeologists such as Professor W. F. Grimes for the London Mithraeum dig, from The Illustrated London News and later from the Ministry of Works. Public awareness of his work was increased by his prolific output and his many publications, starting with 'Roman Britain' (1961), as well drawings commissioned for TV series such as Who Were the British? for Anglia TV. Professor Barry Cunliffe wrote:

To those of us whose interests were kindled and nurtured by the remarkable wave of popular archaeology in the 1950s the name of Alan Sorrell was as well known as those of Glyn Daniel and Sir Mortimer Wheeler. All were experts and scholars in their own fields and all were using their powers of communication to breathe life into the unprepossessing rubble foundations and dreary potsherds that formed the raw material of archaeological research.

Throughout this post-war period, Sorrell still found time for his more imaginative work, which was exhibited at both the Royal Watercolour Society and the Royal Academy plus other venues. The titles were often evocative, such as The Fallen Emperors, The Stone Men and The Dark Tower. A strong characteristic of these paintings is, according to Sorrell, "a sense of the decay of a noble past, and this and their treatment, in its starkness and drama, links them inevitably with his archaeological drawings".

== Family life ==
Sorrell was married twice, first to Irene Agnes Mary Oldershaw in 1932; they divorced in 1946. His second marriage was to the watercolour artist Elizabeth Sorrell née Tanner in 1947. They lived and raised their family in a small converted chapel in Daws Heath in southeast Essex. They had three children, Richard Sorrell (born 1948), an artist, Mark Sorrell (born 1952), a writer, and Julia Sorrell (born 1955), also an artist.

As an active member of the Campaign to Protect Rural England, Sorrell worked to help preserve ancient trees and woodlands in his local area. This was indicative of his Neo-Romantic outlook which was reflected in works such as The Spoilers, The Planting of the trees, and The Assault which was left unfinished on his easel at the time of his death.

He died in 1974, and is buried in Sutton cemetery, Southend-on-Sea, with his wife Elizabeth, who died in 1991.

== Collections and galleries ==
- Imperial War Museum (13 works)
- Liss Fine Art
- London Transport Museum (3 works)
- Museum of London (13 works)
- Sir John Soane's Museum (Exhibition 2013–2014)
- Tate Gallery (2 works)
- English Heritage (40 works)
- National Museum Cardiff
- Government Art Collection (3 works)
- Arts Council Collection
- Cadw
- Historic Scotland
- Manchester Art Gallery (two works)
- Verulanium Museum
- Royal Air Force Museum London (3 works)
- Beecroft Art Gallery (70+ works inc. Nubia collection)
- Magdelen College, Oxford (two works inc. portrait of C S Lewis)
- Royal Academy of Music (1 work)
- Museum of Reading
- Dorset Museum(1 work)
- British Museum
- Portsmouth Museum
- Corporation of London
- British Postal Museum and Archive (1 work)
- Graves Art Gallery, Sheffield (2 works)
- Bradford Art Galleries (1 Work)
- Tyne & Wear Museums and Archive (1 work)
- Norwich Castle Museum (2 work)
- Colchester Castle Museum (3 works)
- Chelmsford Museum and Art Gallery
- South Mill Arts Bishop's Stortford Museum
- Wearing Art Gallery (1 work)
- Stoke Museum Service (1 work)
- Tullie House Museum & Art Gallery Carlisle
- Royal Cornwall Museum Truro (2 works)
- The National Maritime Museum (1 work)
- The Mitchell J Wolfson Museum of Decorative & Propaganda Art, Miami (1 work)
- Kelvingrove Art Gallery and Museum Glasgow (1 work)
- Salisbury and South Wiltshire Museum (3 works)
- National Trust for Places of Historic Interest or Natural Beauty

== Publications ==
- Latinum A reader for the first stage of Latin by C.B. Robinson with illustrations by Alan Sorrell, Cambridge at the University Press, 1940
- Roman Britain text by Aileen Fox, drawings by Alan Sorrell, Lutterworth Press, London 1961
- Saxon England text by John Hamilton, drawings by Alan Sorrell, Lutterworth Press, London 1964
- Living History, text and drawings by Alan Sorrell, B T Batsfords Ltd, London 1965
- Norman Britain text by H. R. Loyn, drawings by Alan Sorrell, Lutterworth Press, London 1966
- Prehistoric Britain text by Barbara Green, drawings by Alan Sorrell, Lutterworth Press, London 1968
- The Holy Bible, Revised Standard Version Colour illustrations by Alan Sorrell, William Collins & Sons, London 1968 ISBN 0-7188-1766-4
- Imperial Rome, by Anthony Birley and Alan Sorrell, Lutterworth Press, London 1970 ISBN 0-7188-1367-7
- Stories from Livy by R.M. Ogilvie, original drawings and maps by Alan Sorrell, Oxford University Press, 1970
- Nubia: A Drowning Land text by Margaret S. Drower, paintings by Alan Sorrell, Longmans, London & Harlow, 1970. ISBN 978-0-582-16440-6
- British Castles text and illustrations by Alan Sorrell, B T Batsford Ltd, London 1973 ISBN 0-7134-1119-8
- Roman Towns in Britain text and illustrations by Alan Sorrell, foreword by Dr Graham Webster, B T Batsford Ltd, London 1976 ISBN 978-0-7134-3237-4
- Medieval Britain Drawing by Alan Sorrell & Richard Sorrell, Lutterworth Press, London 1978
- Alan Sorrell: Ail-greu'r Gorffenol (1980. National Museum of Wales)
- Reconstructing the Past by Alan Sorrell, edited by Mark Sorrell, Batsfords, 1981, ISBN 0-7134-1588-6
