= Sorell =

Sorell may refer to:

== People ==
- Traci Sorell, Cherokee American writer
- William Sorell (1775–1848), Lieutenant-Governor of Tasmania

== Places ==
- Sorell, Tasmania north east of Hobart
  - Sorell Council, a local government area in Tasmania that contains the town of Sorell, Tasmania
- Sorell Creek, Tasmania, a locality in the Derwent Valley Council area
- Cape Sorell, Tasmania on the west coast of Tasmania
- Port Sorell, Tasmania on the north coast
- Lake Sorell, Tasmania, a locality (and a lake) in Tasmania

== See also ==
- Sorel (disambiguation)
- Sorrel (disambiguation)
- Sorrell (disambiguation)
