= Brian Hope-Taylor =

British archaeologist (1923-2001)

Brian Kenneth Hope-Taylor (21 October 1923 – 12 January 2001) was an artist, archaeologist, broadcaster and university lecturer, who made a significant contribution to the understanding of early British history.

== Biography ==
Hope-Taylor was born on 21 October 1923 in Croydon, Surrey, England. An only child born to older parents, he was brought up in Sanderstead. He trained as a wood engraver under George Mackley. During the Second World War, he worked in military intelligence, first in the Naval Intelligence Division and then with RAF Intelligence. Working as a model maker at RAF Medmenham, Hope-Taylor collaborated with professional archaeologists to turn their interpretations of aerial photography into physical 3D models.

In order to advance himself professionally, Hope-Taylor was permitted in 1958 to register at St John's College, Cambridge, to undertake a PhD thesis concerning the archaeology of Yeavering, Northumberland, a seat of governance in Anglo-Saxon Britain, despite never having been to university. He was awarded his doctorate in 1961, when, encouraged by Glyn Daniel, he was appointed as a University Assistant Lecturer in Archaeology at Cambridge. His promotion to a full lectureship was followed, in 1967, by election to a fellowship at University College (now Wolfson College). He became an expert on Yeavering over his years of work there, publishing the excavation report in 1977.

During his time at Cambridge, he continued excavating early Anglo-Saxon sites in the North: on Lindisfarne, at Doon Hill (Dunbar), and at Bamburgh Castle, where he discovered the Bamburgh Sword in 1960. Between the work at Doon Hill and Bamburgh, there came the call (in 1966) to undertake engineering excavations within York Minster, when it was realised that the great building was threatened by collapse. During the repairs which followed, much of his time was spent on ensuring the completion of the essential archaeological investigations, in his capacity as Director of Research, with a committee chaired by his friend, Sir Mortimer Wheeler. Finally, in 1973, he directed a rescue excavation when construction of the A11 required a cutting to be made through the Devil's Dyke in Cambridgeshire.

During the 1960s, Hope-Taylor was recruited by Anglia Television to write and present two successful archaeological series, Who were the British? (1966) and The Lost Centuries (1968), the former of which was nominated for a BAFTA award. He also made a one-off special, The Fight for York Minster (1967), an excursion into the domain of campaigning journalism – in which he emphasised to the British public the historical and cultural value of restoring the Minster. The new medium of television was one which, in the words of his director and producer, Hope-Taylor 'embraced with consummate ease'.

Hope-Taylor resigned his position in Cambridge in 1976 and moved up north, to live in Wooler, Northumberland – close to the Yeavering site that had been the subject of his thesis – where he was cared for in ill health by old friends Vera and Lionel Rutherford. Back to health, he returned to Cambridge in 1981, planning to renew old acquaintances and pursue further archeological discoveries.

He died on 12 January 2001 in Cambridge, some twenty years after his last publication appeared. This attempted to defend his position that the remains he had excavated on Doon Hill were Early Medieval, but it is now clear that there is nothing of that period represented on this site. The remains are in fact of Early Neolithic date, over four thousand years earlier than in his interpretation. New excavations at Yeavering led by Professor Sarah Semple of Durham University also indicate that some of the buildings he identified there, notably in the terminals of the Great Enclosure, are also problematic.

== Publications ==
- Hope-Taylor, Brian (1977). Yeavering: An Anglo-British Centre of Early Northumbria. Department of the Environment Archaeological Report No. 7. Her Majesty’s Stationery Office.
