= Alan Sorrell (footballer) =

Australian rules footballer

Personal information
- Full name: Alan Thomas Sorrell
- Born: 23 May 1923; Ivanhoe, Victoria
- Died: 4 April 2011 (aged 87)
- Original team: MHSOB
- Height: 188 cm (6 ft 2 in)
- Weight: 83 kg (183 lb)

Playing career^{1}
Years	Club	Games (Goals)
1947–1949	Carlton	23 (3)
1950	Fitzroy	1 (0)
Total		24 (3)
- ^{1} Playing statistics correct to the end of 1950.

Alan Thomas Sorrell (born 23 May 1923 – 4 April 2011) was an Australian rules footballer who played with the Carlton Football Club and Fitzroy Football Club in the Victorian Football League (VFL).
