= The Lost Centuries =

British television documentary series

- Directed by: Forbes Taylor
- Presented by: Dr. Brian Hope-Taylor
- Country of origin: United Kingdom
- Original language: English
- No. of episodes: 8

Production
- Producer: Forbes Taylor
- Running time: 25 minutes

Original release
- Network: ITV
- Release: 18 July – 12 September 1971

The Lost Centuries is an eight-part television series made in 1968 by Anglia Television, introduced by Professor Glyn Daniel, presented by Dr Brian Hope-Taylor and produced and directed by Forbes Taylor. It focused upon British history between the departure of the Romans and the arrival of the Renaissance. It was broadcast in 1971 by ITV in a fixed early evening slot (6:30pm), and episodes were of a twenty-five-minute duration.

== Episode guide ==
1. Into Darkness (TX: 18 July 1971)

The decline of the Roman Empire. Modern parallels.

2. The Enemies (TX: 25 July 1971)

The frontiers of the civilised world, what lay beyond. The Limes, Germany - the Saalburg Roman fort - Schleswig, North Germany - Rome.

3. A Dream of Arthur (TX: 8 August 1971)

The post-Roman enigma. 'Arthur's Seat', Edinburgh - Tintagel castle, Cornwall - South Cadbury Hillfort (Alcock excavation)

4. A Star in the East (TX: 15 August 1971)

The rise of Christianity. The Catacombs, Rome - Sancta Sophia, etc, Constantinople.

5. A Golden Age (TX: 22 August 1971)

Saxon Art. Lindisfarne, Northumberland - Durham - East Anglia.

6. Mahomet - in Europe (TX: 29 August 1971)

Impact of the Islamic Empire on Europe.

7. The Fury of the Northmen (TX: 5 September 1971)

The Vikings. The Oseburg ships, Norway - York - etc.

8. Towards a New World (TX: 12 September 1971)

The approaching Renaissance.

== Availability today ==
The entire series can viewed for educational purposes through the online academic archive, Film and Sound Online - within the Anglia Television Library collection. This archive is available to teachers and students in UK Further and Higher Education institutions possessing Athens accounts.
