= Saurel (surname) =

Saurel is a surname of French origin. Notable people with the surname include:

- Agnieszka Bartol-Saurel (born 1974), Polish politician and official
- Amélie Beaury-Saurel (1849–1924), French painter
- Claude Saurel (1948–2025), French rugby union footballer and coach
- Elena Saurel (born 1987/1988), Spanish and American actress and writer
- Olrish Saurel (born 1985), Haitian footballer
- Philippe Saurel (born 1957), French politician
- Pierre de Saurel (1626–1682), a captain in France's Carignan-Salières Regiment
