= Sorrell, Virginia =

Unincorporated community in Virginia, United States

Coordinates: 37°57′15″N 77°11′45″W

Sorrell is an unincorporated community in Caroline County, in the U.S. state of Virginia.
