= Sorel (horse) =

Fictional warhorse

Sorel ("sorrel") is the warhorse of Gerin, one of the Twelve Peers in the French epic, The Song of Roland. Sorel is mentioned in laisse 108 of the poem.
