= Philip Brooke Barnes =

British philanthropist (1926–2009)

Philip Brooke Barnes (15 June 1926 – 27 July 2009) believed that a deeper understanding others cultures and societies was an essential for improving international relations. A view that was informed from his experience in World War II and the early post-war environment.

== Biography ==
=== Early life and education ===
In 1945 he was called up and served in military intelligence. On his return, Barnes finished his economics degree at the London School of Economics, then read philosophy at Jesus College, Cambridge.

=== Career ===
In 1958 Barnes set up the ACE Foundation, supporting it for ten years. Tony Crowe and James Hockey of the Farnham School of Art were founding members of the organisation, as well as John Davies Evans of the Institute of Archaeology at London University.
