= Wynick/Tuck Gallery =

Coordinates: 43.64782°N 79.3948°W

- Established: 1968
- Location: Toronto, Ontario, Canada
- Type: Art gallery
- Directors: Lynne Wynick, David Tuck
- Website: www.wynicktuckgallery.ca

Wynick/Tuck Gallery is a privately owned contemporary art gallery based in Toronto, Ontario, Canada. It is owned and operated by Lynne Wynick and David Tuck. Founded in 1968 as Aggregation Gallery, the gallery presented a wide program of over 500 exhibitions over 45 years. In 2012, Wynick/Tuck Gallery restructured to focus on private sales and art services, such as appraisals, and as of 2016, is only open by appointment. The gallery continues to occasionally hold open houses.

== Artists ==
Major artists represented by Wynick/Tuck Gallery during its history include Monica Tap, Lawrence Weiner, Janice Gurney, Dyan Marie, William Kurelek, Doris McCarthy, Gerald Ferguson and Greg Curnoe.

As of 2016, Wynick/Tuck Gallery continues to represent Ted Rettig along with the estates of Doris McCarthy and Greg Curnoe. Additionally, the gallery's website lists many works for sale by previously represented artists and more, such as David Bierk, John Hall, Mary Pratt, and Michael Snow. Wynick/Tuck Gallery also lists art available from its Aggregation Gallery collection, including works by George Hawken, Norval Morrisseau, and Joshim Kakegamic.

== History ==
=== Aggregation Gallery ===
Wynick/Tuck Gallery started in 1968 as Aggregation Gallery and was originally run by a cooperative of 4 art students and artists. Art student John McDonald and artist, Roman Kowal soon left the business, leaving the gallery in the sole charge of Lynne Wynick and David Tuck. At the time, it was one of only a few galleries exclusively showing contemporary Canadian artists and possibly the first in a downtown warehouse location. The gallery maintained a space at 71 Jarvis Street by also operating a framing business. The gallery supported young artists and maintained an extensive exhibition program, eventually moving into two progressively larger gallery spaces over a 14-year period. Wynick states that she and Tuck initially intended to remain practicing artists while running the gallery, but eventually decided to focus entirely on the gallery. In 1972, Aggregation Gallery moved to 82 Front Street East, a former 4500-square-foot warehouse previously occupied by Fred's Fruits just west of the St. Lawrence Market. As the local St Lawrence neighbourhood revitalized, Tuck supported and worked on a number of committees to stop the destruction of historic buildings, particularly the South St. Lawrence Market building.

=== 80 Spadina ===
In the early 1980s, David Tuck and Lynne Wynick, along with fellow art dealer Olga Korper, decided to move to the mostly-industrial King and Spadina area which was being abandoned by the garment industry. In October 1982, Tuck and Wynick opened at 80 Spadina Avenue as Wynick/Tuck Gallery with a large show of work by Canadian realist painter John Hall. Globe and Mail critic Lisa Bowen lauded the new 6000-square-foot space in an article comparing the new energy of King and Spadina area galleries to the slickness of Yorkville area galleries. By the end of the 1980s the area, as a whole, had evolved into an arts community, with most industrial buildings converted into offices, galleries and fashion outlets.

Starting during the mid-1980s, Wynick/Tuck Gallery participated in a number of high-profile international art fairs, including Art Cologne in 1986 and Art Chicago six times where they received a positive response to the quality of Canadian artists.

Along with solo shows for specific artists, Wynick and Tuck organized thematic exhibitions combining works from many artists, including their ongoing "Informal Ideas" exhibition program. Representing senior and mid-career artists along with establishing young artists created a mix of artistic ideas. Wynick curated a number of highly regarded exhibitions, bringing together artists such as Lawrence Weiner, Gerald Ferguson, Greg Curnoe, and Mandario Merz, which helped open up new ways of presenting artists in a commercial gallery setting.

=== 401 Richmond ===
In 2001 Wynick/Tuck Gallery moved to the large former industrial building at 401 Richmond Street West, which was being developed by the community minded Margie Zeidler in a similar way to the development of 80 Spadina. Wynick and Tuck renovated a new space at 401 that combined the best of their previous spaces, particularly the combination of a larger space with smaller spaces for more intimate viewing and a ground floor location. At 401 Richmond Wynick/Tuck Gallery continued its exhibition program, of which it maintains an archive on its website. The gallery also provided its space, staff and expertise to the Casey House Art Auction, for 13 consecutive years, and to the University of Toronto's fundraiser for their new public gallery space in Scarborough.

=== Restructuring ===
In 2012, Wynick and Tuck announced that they would be closing their large public space to focus on private art sales and appraisals. The gallery continues to operate out of small space in 401 Richmond. It represents a few artists and resells work from many previously represented artists, much of which is listed on the gallery's website.

== Art community participation ==
During the years, both Wynick and Tuck served on various boards. Tuck worked from 1973 to 1996 on the board of Art Dealers Association of Canada when it was involved in the development of critical government policies for the visual arts and artists. He also was a member of the Community Relations Committee at the Art Gallery of Ontario. Wynick served for five years on the Canadian Cultural Property and Review Board, during a time of growth and transition as the Cultural Property Act became widely used. She worked closely with the arts community to insure any changes and decisions were beneficial to the arts community. Wynick also served on the board of the Power Plant Art Gallery from its inception as the Art Gallery at Harbourfront through to the first years in its present location. She helped the gallery remain connected to the community while developing an international profile.
