= Richard Sorrell =

British artist working in oil acrylic (born 1948)

Richard Sorrell (born 24 September 1948 in Thundersley, Essex) is a British artist working in oil acrylic. He now lives in Cornwall.

== Biography ==
=== Early life ===
He was born in Thundersley in Essex to the historical draughtsman and painter Alan Sorrell (1904–1974) and watercolorist Elizabeth Sorrell.

=== Career ===
He was trained at Walthamstow College of Art (1965–1966) and then at Kingston College of Art (1966–1969). He then went on to attend the Royal Academy Schools (1969–1972) where he was a student of Peter Greenham, Roderic Barrett, Edward and Richard Bawden and Fred Heyworth. He was awarded the RA Schools Silver and Bronze Medals.

In 1975 he was elected to the Royal Watercolour Society, followed in 1988 Royal Society of British Artists and the New English Art Club in 1995.

In 2001 Richard Sorrell presented a picture of her Centenary parade to HM Queen Elizabeth the Queen Mother.

He was vice-president of the Royal Watercolour Society from 2002 until 2005, then president from 2006 until 2009.

He was a governor of the Mall Galleries (2000–2006).

=== Work ===
He has is known for his aerial views. These pictures are based on a map or plan, which were put into perspective, and elevations of buildings were drawn on this perspective plan. Heights of trees and the rise and fall of the land were estimated and added. The pictures required a great deal of research – for instance, a view of Norwich in the time of Richard I was the result of much consultation with archaeologists about the (now often vanished) churches, the layout of the streets and so on. This picture now hangs in Norwich City Hall. A view of the channel tunnel workings at Shakespeare Cliff near Dover was actually commissioned by the V&A Museum during the time of the construction of the Tunnel and is now in the V&A collection.

Since the 1990s he has concentrated on "invented figurative pictures". In subjective painting, one approaches from quite a different point of view. This is painting about things rather than light, about situations. It is a building towards a scene rather than the depiction of it. There is no clear connection between the two kinds of painting. For example, it is not really possible to take a drawing from life and work it up into an invented composition – or rather it is possible, but the resulting painting would be likely to be dull – less successful than if it had been painted directly from life and less inventive than if it had been evolved from paint marks. Is this the subjective view of the artist?

His work featured in documentary film The Open Sky: RWS Artists in Newlyn directed by Stephen Gammond.

== Public collections ==
- The Victoria and Albert Museum: Aerial view of the Channel Tunnel workings at Shakespeare Cliff, with supporting material and drawings.
- The National Trust: Aerial views of Blickling, Norfolk; Ickworth, Suffolk; Uppark, Sussex and paintings of Calke Abbey, Flatford Mill and Oakhurst Cottage, Surrey
- The Faringdon Collection: Two aerial views of Buscot Park
- Norwich City Council: Aerial view of Norwich as it appeared in 1194
- Godalming Museum: Aerial view of Orchards, designed by Lutyens and Gertrude Jekyll
- The Museum of London; Views of Roman and Saxon London
- St Nicholas Abbey, Barbados
- Beecroft Art Gallery, Southend-on-Sea: Mr King's Cattle (c. 1980)
