= John and Benjamin Green =

English architects

John Green (29 June 1787 – 30 September 1852) and Benjamin Green (9 January 1813 – 14 November 1858) were a father and son who worked in partnership as architects in North East England during the early nineteenth century. John, the father was a civil engineer as well as an architect. Although they did carry out some commissions separately, they were given joint credit for many of their projects, and it is difficult to attribute much of their work to a single individual. In general, John Green worked on civil engineering projects, such as road and rail bridges, whereas Benjamin worked on projects that were more purely architectural. Their work was predominantly church and railway architecture, with a sprinkling of public buildings that includes their masterpiece, Newcastle's Theatre Royal.

Drawings by John and Benjamin Green are held by the Laing Art Gallery in Newcastle upon Tyne, in the Northumberland County Archive at Woodhorn, and in the Duke of Northumberland's archive at Alnwick Castle.

== Biographies ==
=== John Green ===
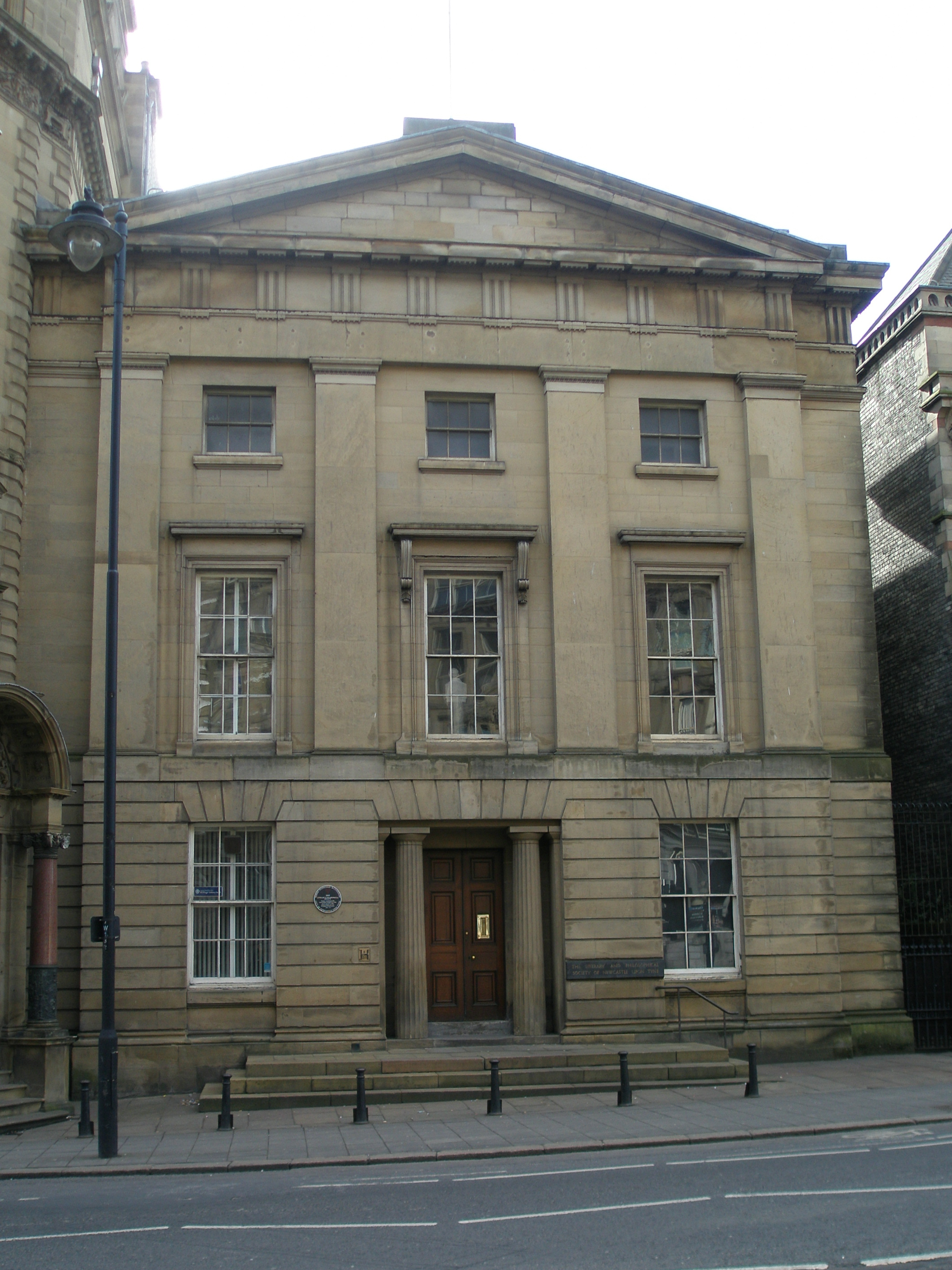
The front of the Literary and Philosophical Society building in Newcastle, designed by John Green

John Green was born on 29 June 1787 at Newton Fell House, Nafferton, two miles north of Ovington, Northumberland. He was the son of William Green, a carpenter and maker of agricultural implements. After finishing school, he worked in his father's business. The firm moved to the market town of Corbridge and began general building work with young John concentrating on architectural work. About 1820, John set up business as an architect and civil engineer in nearby Newcastle upon Tyne.

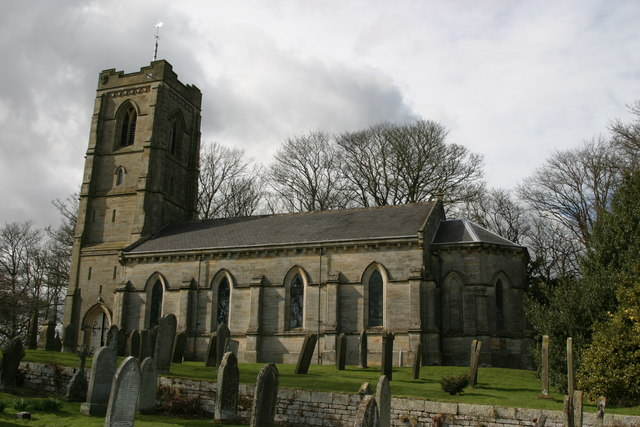
Holy Trinity Church, Cambo, by John and Benjamin Green

John Green married Jane Ellis (1783-1846) in 1810, and they had one son, Benjamin (1813-58), and a daughter, Isabella. Benjamin worked in partnership with his father on many projects.

In 1822 John Green designed a new building for the Newcastle Literary and Philosophical Society. The building, which houses the society's substantial library, is still in use today. He also designed a number of farmhouses, being employed on the Beaufront estate near Hexham and also on the Duke of Northumberland's estates.

John Green was principally a civil engineer, and built several road and rail bridges. In 1829–31 he built two wrought-iron suspension bridges crossing the Tyne (at Scotswood) and the Tees (at Whorlton). The bridge at Scotswood was demolished in 1967 but the one at Whorlton still survives. When the High Level Bridge at Newcastle was proposed ten years later, John Green submitted plans, but those of Robert Stephenson were accepted by the York, Newcastle and Berwick Railway. Green also built a number of bridges using an innovative system of laminated timber arches on masonry piers, the Weibeking system, based on the work of Bavarian engineer C.F. Weibeking. The two he built for the Newcastle and North Shields Railway, at the Ouseburn and at Willington Quay remain in use, though the timbers were replaced with wrought iron in a similar lattice pattern in 1869. In 1840 he was elected to the Institution of Civil Engineers, and in 1841 he was awarded the institution's Telford Medal for his work on laminated arch design.

Alongside his railway work, John designed stone bridges for new turnpike roads at Bellingham (Northumberland), Lintzford (Co.Durham), and Blackwell (Co. Durham). These were accompanied by toll houses in his usual plain style.

John Green died in Newcastle on 30 September 1852.

=== Benjamin Green ===
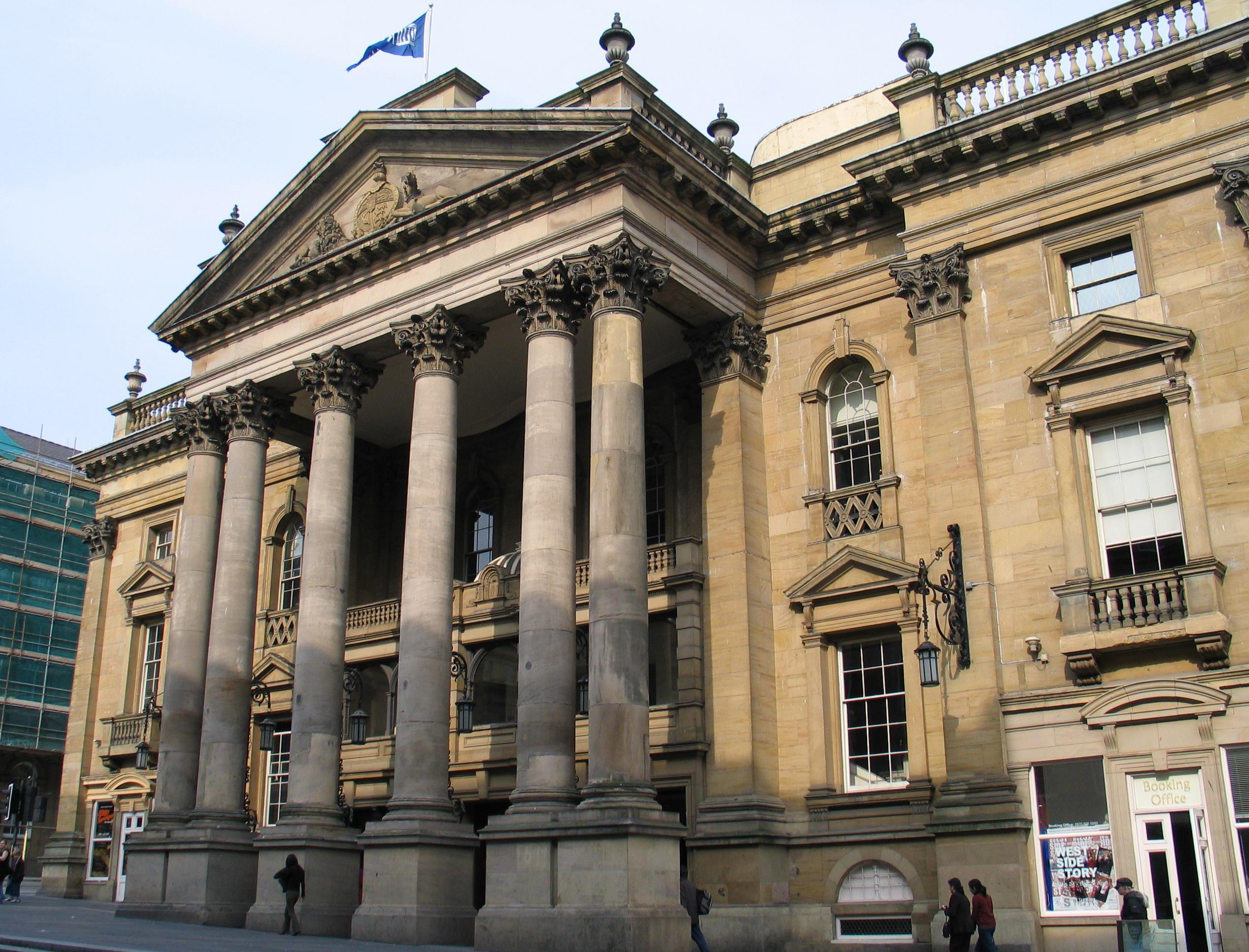
Theatre Royal on Grey Street, Newcastle

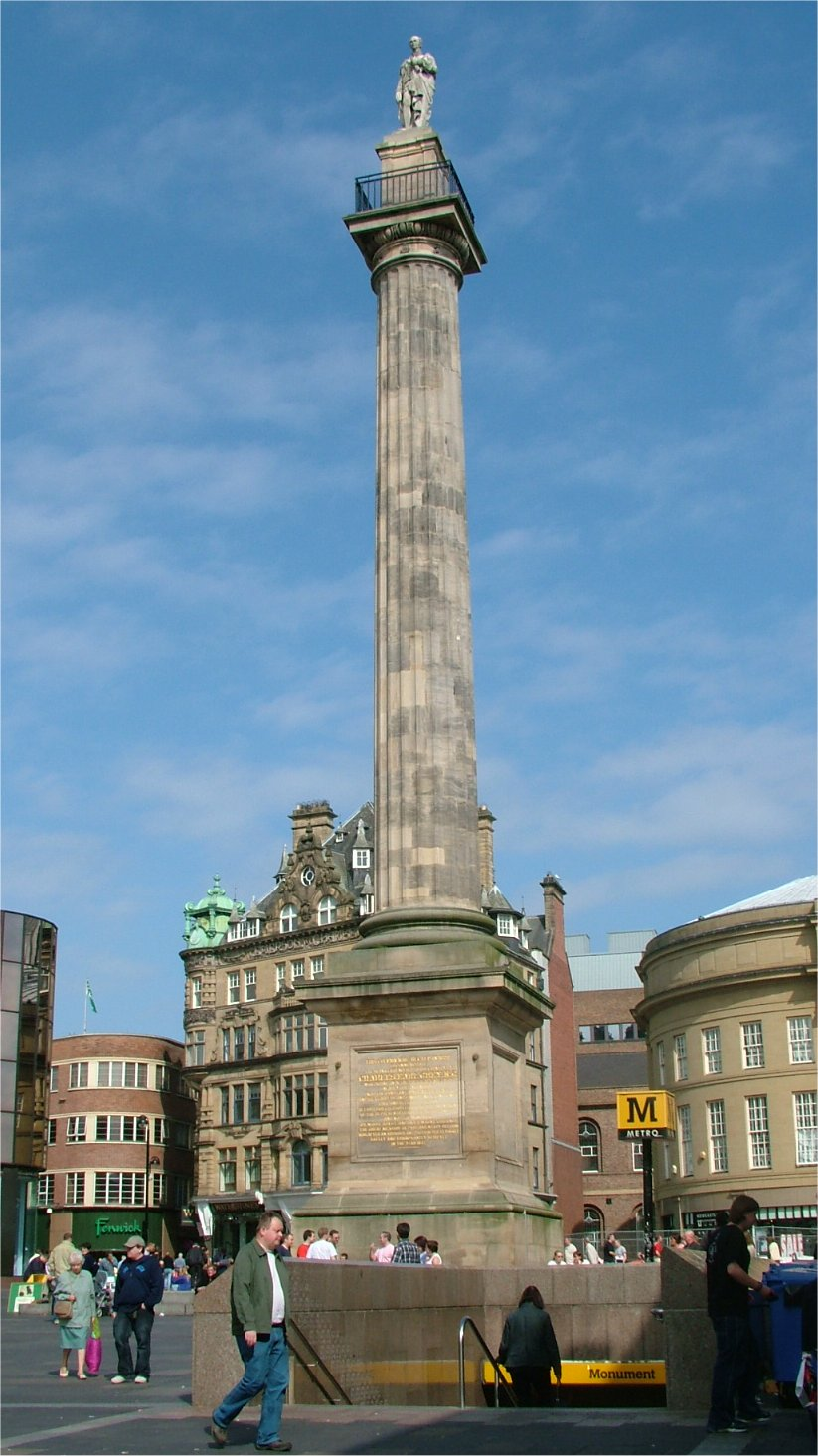
Grey's Monument in the centre of Newcastle

Benjamin Green was a pupil of Augustus Charles Pugin, father of the more famous Augustus Welby Northmore Pugin. In the mid-1830s he became a partner of his father and remained so until the latter's death in 1852. The two partners differed somewhat. John has been described as a 'plain, practical, shrewd man of business' with a 'plain, severe and economical' style, whereas Benjamin was 'an artistic, dashing sort of fellow', with a style that was 'ornamental, florid and costly'.

The Greens worked as railway architects and it is believed that all the main line stations between Newcastle and Berwick upon Tweed were designed by Benjamin. In 2020 Morpeth Station was restored to Green's original designs following a £2.3M investment. They also designed a number of Northumbrian churches, the best examples being at Earsdon and Cambo.

The Green's most important commissions in Newcastle were the Theatre Royal (1836–37) and the column for Grey's Monument (1837–38). Both of these structures were part of the re-development of Newcastle city centre in neo-classical style by Richard Grainger, and both exist today. Although both of the partners were credited with their design, it is believed that Benjamin was the person responsible.

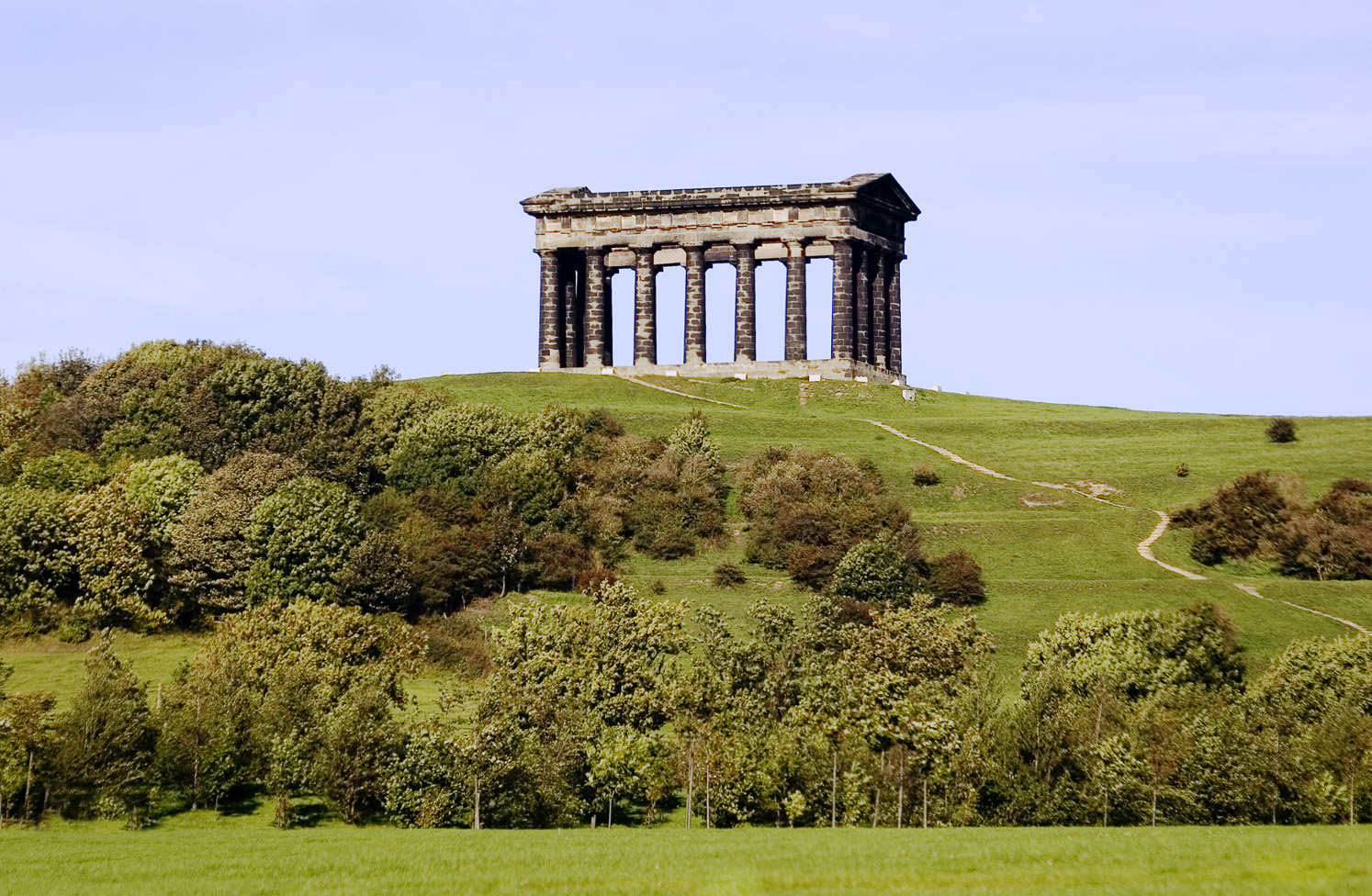
Penshaw Monument, County Durham

Another well-known structure designed by the Greens is Penshaw Monument (1844). This is a folly standing on Penshaw Hill in County Durham. It was built as a half-sized replica of the renowned Temple of Hephaestus in Athens, and was dedicated to John George Lambton, first Earl of Durham and the first Governor of the Province of Canada. The monument, being built on a hill is visible for miles around and is a famous local landmark. It is now owned by the National Trust.

Benjamin Green survived his father by only six years, and died in a mental home at Dinsdale Park, County Durham on 14 November 1858.

== Major works ==
Active c.1818 to 1858. Over 100 attributed works, including at least 21 churches and chapels, 35 railway stations, 10 farms, and 8 bridges. Of these about 75% survive.

Styford Hall and Stables, Styford, Northumberland, before 1820
Cresswell House, Cresswell, Northumberland, 1821 (demolished 1931, builder: John Green, architect: John Shaw)
Inn at Thurston (now the Northumberland Arms, Felton), 1820s
Scotch Church, Blackett St, Newcastle upon Tyne, 1821 (demolished 1903)
Presbyterian Chapel, Newcastle, 1822 (demolished 2011)
Literary and Philosophical Society, Newcastle, 1822–1825
East Cocklaw Farm, Wall, Northumberland, 1824
Hallington New Houses Farm, Hallington, Northumberland, 1820s
Heckley High House Farm, Alnwick, Northumberland, 1820s
Thornborough High Barns Farm, Aydon, Northumberland, 1820s (probable attribution)
Thornborough Kiln Farm, Aydon, Northumberland, 1820s
Farms on the Beaufront Estate, Corbridge, Northumberland, 1824
St Peter's Church, Falstone, Northumberland, 1824–1825 (burnt 1890, restored 1891)
Westgate Hill Cemetery, Newcastle, 1825–1829 (lodge demolished 1970, railings and gates removed, piers and basic layout remains)
Ingram Farm,Ingram, Northumberland, 1826
Park Farm, Hulne Park, Alnwick, Northumberland, 1827, and other farms for the Duke of Northumberland, 1820s
Whorlton Suspension Bridge, Wycliffe, County Durham, 1829–1831
Hawks Cottages, Gateshead, 1830 (demolished 1960)
Scotswood Chain Bridge, Scotswood, Newcastle, 1831, (demolished 1967)
Church of St Mary and St Thomas Aquinas, Stella, 1831–1832
Blackwell Bridge, Darlington, 1832
Holy Trinity Church, Usworth, Tyne and Wear 1832
Holy Trinity Church, Washington, Tyne and Wear, 1832
Bellingham Bridge and toll house (Bridge End), Bellingham, Northumberland, 1834
Lintzford Bridge, Gateshead, 1834
Holy Trinity Church, Stockton-On-Tees, 1834–1835 (destroyed by fire 1991, shell survives)
Holy Trinity Church, Dalton (near Stamfordham), Northumberland, 1836
Vicarage of St Alban, Earsdon, Tyne and Wear, 1836
Church of St Alban, Earsdon, Tyne and Wear, 1836–1837
St Mary's Roman Catholic Church, Alnwick, Northumberland, (now Bailiffgate Museum) 1836
Church of the Holy Saviour, Newburn, Newcastle, 1836–1837
Poor Law Guardians Hall, North Shields, 1837
Master Mariners Homes, Tynemouth, 1837–1840
Theatre Royal, Newcastle upon Tyne, 1837
1-7 Market Street, Newcastle, 1837
North side of Shakespeare Street, Newcastle, 1837
34-44 Pilgrim Street, Newcastle, 1837
Parish Hall of the Church of the Holy Saviour, Newburn, Newcastle, 1838
Column of Grey's Monument, Newcastle upon Tyne, 1838
Corn Exchange, Groat Market, Newcastle, 1838 (demolished 1974)
St Hildas Church, Middlesbrough, 1838 (demolished 1969)
Willington Viaduct, Wallsend, 1837–1839
Ouseburn Viaduct, Newcastle, 1837–1839
Skelton Bridge, Nether Poppleton, North Yorkshire (Rail; East Coast Main Line), 1839
Church of the Holy Saviour, Tynemouth, 1839–1841
Newham Barns Farm (Newham Hall), Ellingham, Northumberland, 1840s
Ilderton Vicarage, Ilderton, Northumberland, 1841
Streatlam Castle, County Durham, alterations, 1841 (demolished 1959)
Streatlam Castle South Lodges, County Durham, 1841
Church of St. Bartholomew, Whittingham, Northumberland, 1840 (rebuilding of mediaeval church)
The Red Cottage, Whitburn, Tyne and Wear, 1842
Trustee Savings Bank, Barrington St., South Shields, 1842
Holy Trinity Church, Cambo, Northumberland, 1842
Church of St. Mary, Woodhorn, Northumberland, 1843-4 (rebuilding of mediaeval church)
Holy Trinity Church, Horsley-on-Rede, Northumberland, 1844
The Earl of Durham's Monument (Penshaw Monument), Sunderland, 1844
St Edwin's, Coniscliffe, Co. Durham, 1844 (restoration of mediaeval church)
40–44 Mosley Street, Newcastle, 1845
Witham Testimonial Hall, Barnard Castle, County Durham, 1846
North Shields Railway Station 1846 (demolished)
Old Railway Station, Tynemouth Rd, Tynemouth 1846–1847
25 stations on the Newcastle and Berwick Railway, Northumberland, 1847 (now the East Coast Main Line):
Killingworth (demolished 1973), Cramlington (demolished), Netherton (called Stannington from 1892), Morpeth, Longhirst, Widdrington, Chevington (originally crossing keepers' cottages, became station in 1870), Acklington, Warkworth, Bilton (called Alnmouth from 1892, demolished), Lesbury, Longhoughton (demolished c. 1968), Little Mill (demolished 1960s), Christon Bank, Fallodon (demolished 1960), Chathill, Newham (originally crossing keepers' cottages, became station in 1851), Lucker (demolished 1960), Belford, Smeafield (originally crossing keeper's cottage, became station by 1871), Craghall (originally crossing keeper's cottage, became station by 1871), Beal (demolished 1979), Goswick (originally crossing keeper's cottage, became station in 1866) Scremerston, Tweedmouth (with Railway Hotel, both demolished c.1968)
Tweedmouth Station Enginemen's Cottages, Northumberland, 1849 (demolished c.1968)
Holy Trinity Church, Seghill, Northumberland, 1849
6 stations on the Tweedmouth-Kelso-St Boswells Railway Line, Northumberland/ Borders Region, 1849:
Velvet Hall, Norham, Coldstream (demolished), Sunilaws (uncertain attribution), Carham (demolished c.1968), Sprouston
Newcastle Joint Stock Bank, St Nicholas Square, Newcastle, c.1850
Nicholson House (now Carlton House), Mowbray Road, Sunderland, 1850
Bede Tower, Burdon Road, Sunderland, 1851
4 stations on the Alston Branch Railway, Northumberland, 1852:
Alston, Featherstone Park, Lambley, Slaggyford
St Paul's Church, Elswick, Newcastle, 1854
All Saints Cemetery, Jesmond, Newcastle 1854
Sailor's Home, 11 New Quay, North Shields, 1856
United Free Methodist Church, North Shields, 1857
St Mary the Virgin, Rye Hill, Newcastle, 1858 (demolished 1960s)
St Mary the Virgin Almshouses, Rye Hill, Newcastle, 1858 (possible attribution))

== Sources ==
- Bell, P.W.R. (2018) The Work and Professional Status of John (1787-1852) and Benjamin Green (1813-1858) Architects and Engineers Paper given to the 6th International Congress on Construction History, Brussels, Belgium, accessed 2024-12-8 https://www.academia.edu/108354075/The%20work%20and%20professional%20status%20of%20John%201787%201852%20and%20Benjamin%20Green%201813%2058%20architects%20and%20engineers
- Dobson, H.G. (2006), Men of Merit, ISBN 0-9531840-7-2
- Leach, Peter (2004). "Green, John (1787–1852)". Oxford Dictionary of National Biography (online ed.). Oxford University Press. doi:10.1093/ref:odnb/37484. (Subscription, Wikipedia Library access or UK public library membership required.)
- Fawcett, Bill (2001) A history of North Eastern Railway architecture Vol 1: The Pioneers
- Grundy, J., McCombie, G., Ryder, P., Welfare, H. & Pevsner, N. (1992) The Buildings of England: Northumberland. ISBN 0 14 0710590
- Skempton, A.W., ed. (2002), A Biographical Dictionary of Civil Engineers in Great Britain and Ireland, vol. 1 (1500–1830), Thomas Telford / Institute of Civil Engineers, GREEN, John (1787–1852), pp.271–2, ISBN 0-7277-2939-X
