= The Round =

Theatre in Newcastle, England, 2007–2008

- The space inside The Round
- Interactive map of The Round
- Address: Lime Street, Ouseburn; Newcastle upon Tyne; England
- Coordinates: 54.973°N 1.613°W
- Current use: The Cluny 2 (2009-)

Construction
- Opened: 2007
- Closed: 2008
- Architect: John Dobson

The Round was a theatre-in-the-round in the Ouseburn Valley, Newcastle upon Tyne, England. The region's first theatre-in-the-round, it specialised in theatre for children and young people. The Round opened in September 2007, and was home to the Bruvvers Theatre Company.

The building in which The Round was housed is a former flax mill designed by John Dobson in 1848. The 180-seat theatre slotted behind a listed facade in a courtyard space between warehouses on Lime Street.

The Round was conceived by the Bruvvers Theatre Company artistic director Mike Mould who bought the derelict Cluny building in 1982 with the intention of creating a theatre within its walls. In 2005, Mould sent a letter to his friends asking each to donate £1 to help fund the cost of building the theatre. Bruvvers director and television scriptwriter Julie Blackie suggested alternative methods of fundraising.

The theatre had one wall with a fixed block of 40 seats and three balconies, with the remaining seats moveable according to the needs of each production According to the company, there was "one main route onto the stage for the performers, but also a few secret passages to add an element of surprise."

The company filed for voluntary liquidation in May 2008, just eight months after its launch. The Round Theatre had been built with capital funding from a consortium of parties in the Ouseburn district of Newcastle but had failed to secure funding for programming or administrative costs beyond its first six months of trading. Directors Jeannie Adams and Julie Blackie decided to cease trading and begin liquidation proceedings. Average houses of just 52% fell far short of the 70% capacity the company had budgeted to break even.

In May 2009, it was announced that The Cluny would be taking over the running of the adjacent former Round Theatre.
