= Ouseburn Valley =

Valley in Tyne and Wear, England

- Valley
- Location in Tyne and Wear
- Coordinates: 54.974°N 1.590°W
- Grid position: NZ263644
- Location: Tyne and Wear, England, UK

The Ouseburn Valley is the name of the valley of the Ouseburn, a small tributary of the River Tyne, running southwards through the east of Newcastle upon Tyne, England. The name refers particularly to the urbanised lower valley, spanned by three impressive bridges, which is nowadays a cultural and social oasis close to the centre of Newcastle.

== Industrial history ==
The lower Ouseburn was the cradle of the Industrial Revolution in Newcastle. There was a cluster of heavy crafts and industries in the area. Coal was brought from the Town Moor along the Victoria Tunnel, where the tidal nature of the Ouseburn allowed wherries – the local barges – to be loaded at low tide and pulled out to the collier brigs and snows waiting in the Tyne.

== Cultural development ==
The lower Ouseburn Valley had fallen into disuse and dereliction by the mid-twentieth century, but its industrial heritage had left many large buildings which, since the 1970s, have increasingly been utilised as creative workspaces by artists, musicians and performers. From 1996, a development trust (the Ouseburn Trust), in partnership with the local authority, has led the area's regeneration as a cultural hotspot. This has been so successful that Ouseburn is now marketed as a trendy place to live.

The area is now a hub for the arts and creative industries, and is home to the Biscuit Factory (open gallery), the Mushroom Works (open first weekend of the month), Testhouse 5 (appointment only), North Grange Glass (stained glass gallery and cafe), 36 Lime Street and Cobalt Studios. The Valley is also the home of Seven Stories, the national centre for children's books.

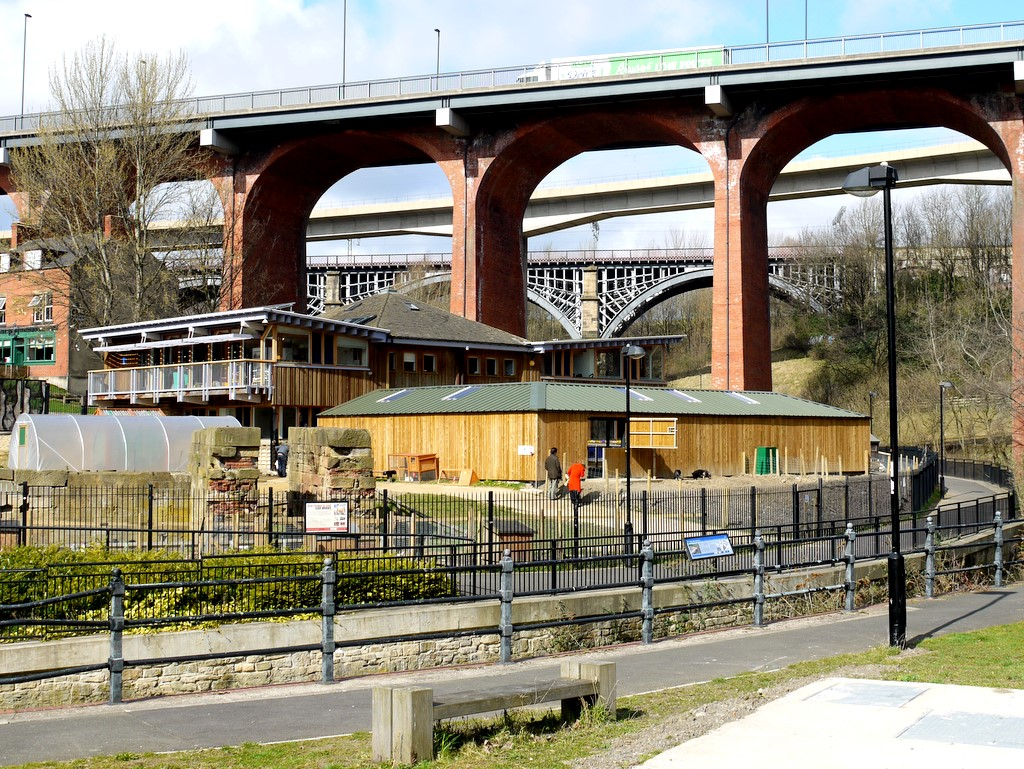
The Byker Bridge, from the valley floor, with the Byker Viaduct and the Ouseburn Viaduct behind it. The Ouseburn city farm seen in front of them is on the line of Hadrian's Wall, no longer extant in this location.

The Ouseburn Trust remains a landlord and developer in the Valley, and seeks to involve people in the heritage and regeneration of the area through its programme of free walks, talks and volunteering activities.

Ouseburn Farm was founded in 1976 in the valley as a city farm to give children green space and experience with animals and plants.

== Other features ==
The valley is home to a number of pubs and music venues including The Cluny.

There are three high-level bridges that cross the valley in close proximity to each other. These are the Ouseburn railway Viaduct, the Byker Viaduct carrying the Tyne and Wear Metro, and the Byker road bridge.

Hadrian's Wall crossed the Ouseburn just to the south of the Byker road bridge, and is thought to have run through the site of the City Farm. No trace of the wall can now be seen above ground, though an illustrated information board can be seen at the eastern end of a new block of flats on the east side of the river, which were built on the line of the wall.

== Miscellaneous ==
The Valley has its own community wiki, created by Alex Finnegan, founder of PuppetShip CIC.
