= Grey's Monument =

Monument in Newcastle upon Tyne, England

- Grey's Monument
- Interactive map of Grey's Monument
- Location: Newcastle upon Tyne, England
- Coordinates: 54.9738°N 1.6132°W
- Designer: John Green (column); Edward Hodges Baily (statue)
- Builder: Joseph Welch
- Height: 133 ft (41 m)
- Beginning date: 6 September 1837
- Completion date: 11 August 1838 (column); 24 August 1838 (statue)
- Dedicated to: Charles Grey, 2nd Earl Grey

Grey's Monument is a Grade I-listed monument in the centre of Newcastle upon Tyne, England. It was built in 1838 in recognition of Charles Grey, 2nd Earl Grey, Prime Minister of the United Kingdom from 1830 to 1834. In particular, it celebrates the passing of the Great Reform Act 1832, one of Grey's most important legislative achievements. The act reorganised the system of parliamentary constituencies and increased the number of those eligible to vote.

The monument is located at the junction of Grey, Grainger and Blackett Streets and has a total height of 133 ft (41 m). It was funded via public subscription and consists of a statue of Earl Grey on a pedestal standing on top of a Roman Doric column. The column was designed by local architect, Benjamin Green, and the statue was created by the sculptor, Edward Hodges Baily.

A contemporary report of the unveiling ceremony described the monument as "a fine imaginative work of art" and other 19th century commentators praised it as "a noble effort of genius" and as having "a most commanding appearance". However, its location, then at the centre of the city's tram infrastructure, was criticised as unsuitable, with one newspaper declaring that "in its present situation, it will be a great nuisance" and, in the 1920s, there were calls to move the column to improve traffic flow. In 1981, the nearby station on the Tyne and Wear Metro was named after the monument. The pedestrianised area around the base is a popular meeting place and is used as a speakers' corner.

== History ==
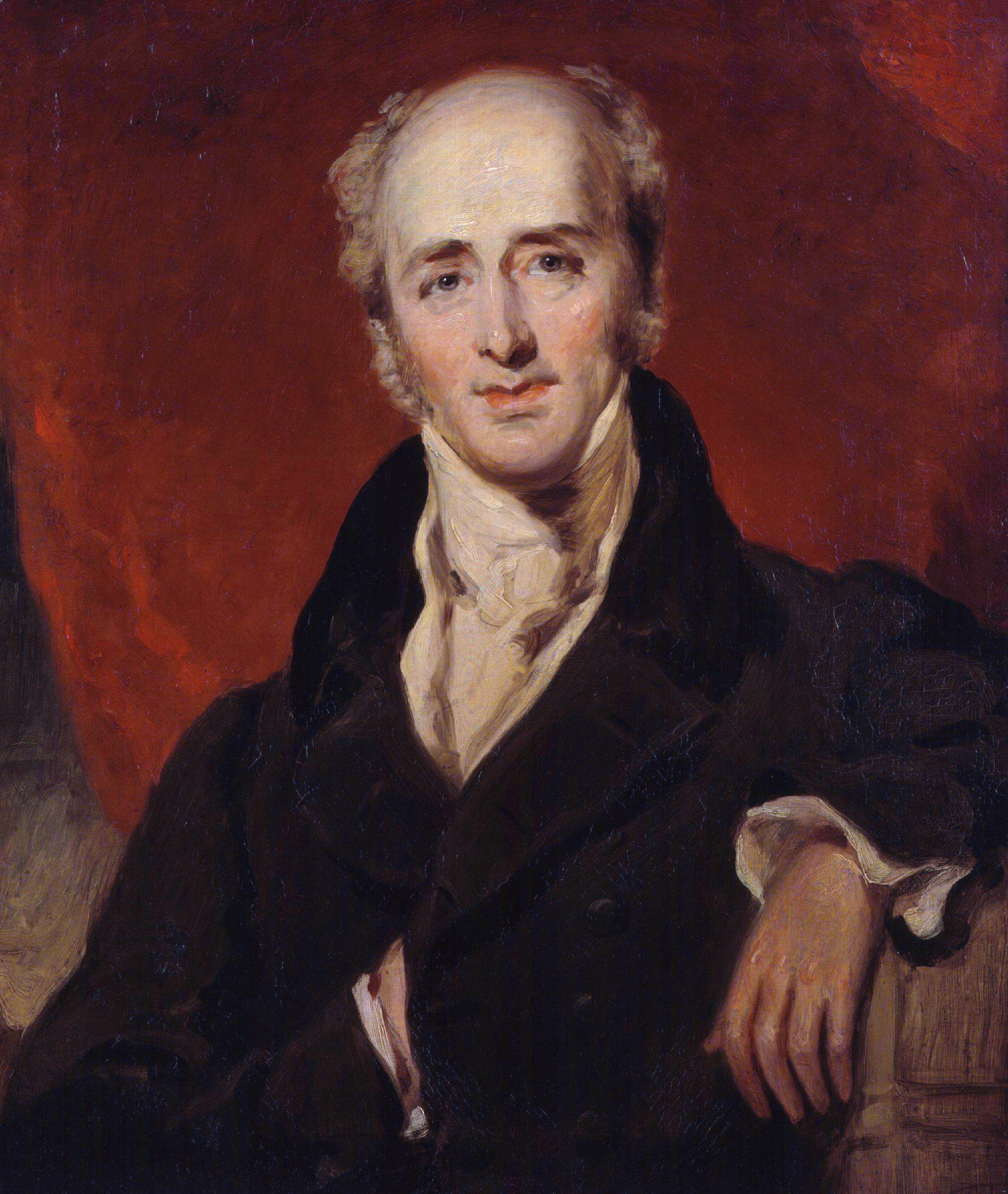
Charles Grey, 2nd Earl Grey, (1764–1845)

=== Context ===
Grey's Monument was erected in recognition of the tenure of Charles Grey as prime minister. Earl Grey represented Northumberland in Parliament from the age of 22. He was made First Lord of the Admiralty in 1806, and later Leader of the House of Commons. In 1830 he was invited to form a government and became Prime Minister. It was during his time as prime minister that he passed the Reform Act 1832, which brought about constituency reform and extended the right to vote. Grey's Monument was constructed when Grey was still alive and had retired from politics.

=== Conception and planning ===
A monument to Earl Grey was first proposed by the Newcastle-based architect, John Green, in 1832. Green envisaged a statue in Northumberland Square, North Shields, depicting Grey in parliamentary robes, holding the Magna Carta. He sought public subscriptions for his scheme in the Newcastle Chronicle on 16 June 1832:

Instead of expressing our grateful Joy in the childish Barbarism of wasteful and dangerous Illuminations, which blaze for an Hour and are forgotten for ever; let us erect a Monument that shall commemorate to future Ages our Gratitude to the Friend of the People! the Prince of Patriots! and the Honour of Northumberland, EARL GREY!!!

The proposal was initially met with enthusiasm, although some Reformers were hesitant to commemorate an individual, instead preferring to erect a monument to the cause of the Reform movement itself. Alternative sites for the monument were proposed, including Rimside Moor in Northumberland.

The eventual site of the monument in central Newcastle was chosen as part of a local improvement plan proposed by Richard Grainger. In his plan, Grainger proposed to erect a statue not of Grey, but of an idealised figure. However, in 1834, Earl Grey was proposed as the subject of the statue. A public meeting took place on 6 October, chaired by William Ord, "to take into consideration the propriety of entering into a subscription, for erecting in a public situation in his native county, a statue, or other memorial, to the memory of the Noble Earl". There was unanimous support for the monument and £500 was raised on the day. One of the subscribers to the final monument was Whig politician and Irish political leader Daniel O'Connell.

The final location of the monument was slow to be approved, due to indecision from the council. There was also some lack of approval of Earl Grey himself; he was not as popular as he had been around the time of the Great Reform Bill's passing, and after leaving politics in 1834 Grey had focussed on a quiet life outside of the public sphere. Plans for Grey's Monument were approved by Newcastle Town Council on 14 September 1836. In the same meeting, it was agreed that the location of the monument would be at the top of Upper Dean Street, which would be renamed "Grey Street". (Note: When the monument was constructed, it was located at a centre of Newcastle's tram system. It is now part of the Monument local authority ward.) Councillor Charnley spoke about the location of the monument, saying:

"It must be well known to most of us that great anxiety has been felt to fix upon a proper situation for the monument; and after long deliberation, the Committee have come to the resolution that the place proposed is the fittest and most appropriate in Newcastle. It will be for you to decide whether, in your judgement, the Committee have come to a proper determination".

Benjamin Green, John Green's son, designed the monument's column, which was to cost £1,600. The architects initially intended for the monument to be taller, but the height was limited by the amount of money raised via subscriptions. Edward Hodges Baily was commissioned to design the statue of the Earl which cost £700.

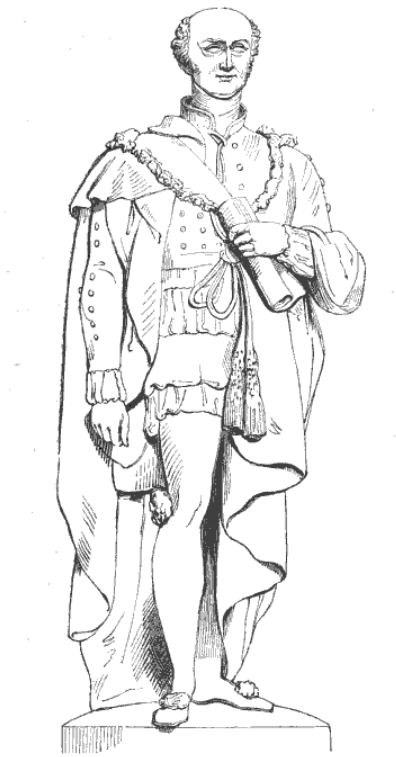
Illustration of the statue published in The Mirror of Literature, Amusement, and Instruction in 1838.

=== Construction and unveiling ===
Joseph Welch, who had previously built the Ouseburn Viaduct and Bellingham Bridge, was in charge of building the monument. The foundation stone was laid on 6 September 1837 by both John and Benjamin Green. A time capsule was buried at the time of the monument's construction. It contained a hermetically sealed glass bottle which contained a drawing of the structure, a collection of coins, local medals and tradesmen's tokens donated by John Ralph Fenwick, and a list of the monument's subscribers

Following the completion of the column on 11 August 1838, the Earl and Countess Grey visited Newcastle and were reported to have shown "evident signs of pleasure" when viewing the structure. On 24 August 1838, the statue of Earl Grey was placed on top of the column. It was transported from London by Halcyon, a trader based in Newcastle, and moved to its base from the quay of the River Tyne by two wagons. Church bells rang throughout the day to commemorate the occasion, although Earl Grey did not attend. In November 1838, the scaffolding encasing the monument was removed.

== Design ==
=== Column ===
Measured from the bottom of the column to the top of the statue, Grey's Monument is 133 ft (41 m) tall. The fluted column is Roman Doric in style and is 9 ft 11 in (3.02 m) in diameter. The column was originally built from stone from the Pennines, later replaced with sandstone ashlar. A helical staircase with 164 steps leads to a viewing platform at the top of the monument, which is occasionally opened to the public. Four lamps were placed at the base of the monument in 1893, increasing to 12 in the 1920s. The railings and lamps have since been removed. A building survey conducted in 1995 concluded that the monument was built on shallow foundations. It also found that the column can sway up to 30 cm (12 in) in the wind.

=== Statue ===
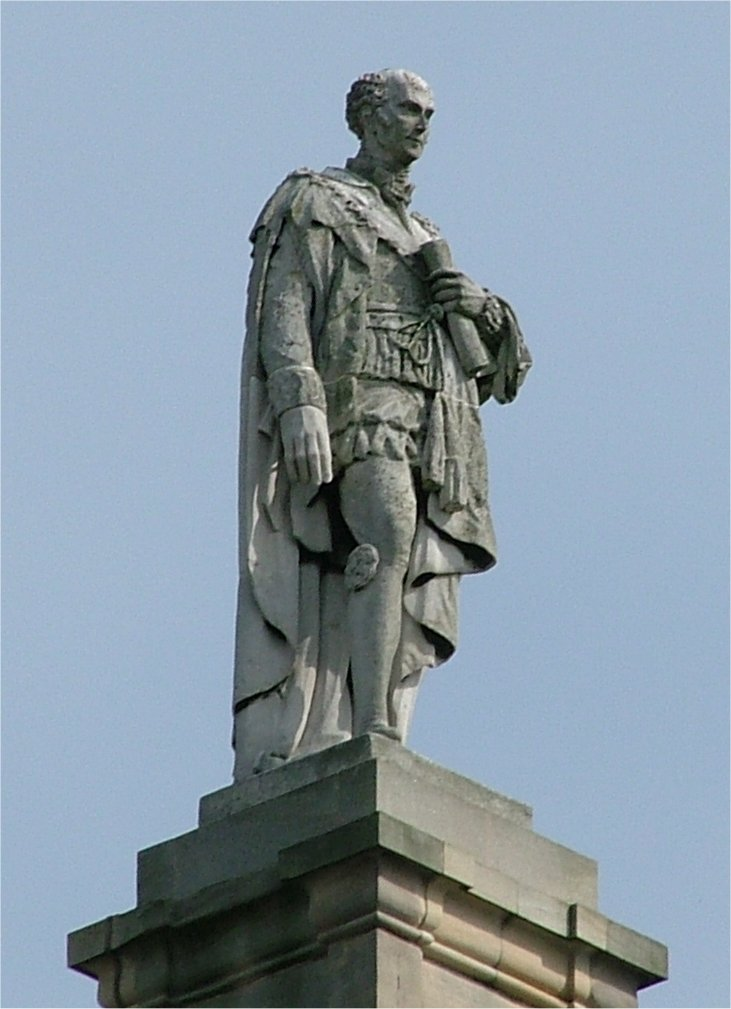
The Portland stone statue is twice-life-size and stands atop the column.

At the top of the column there is a pedestal surrounded by railings which enclose the viewing platform. The statue of Earl Grey by E. H. Baily sits on top of the pedestal. The statue depicts a 13 ft (4.0 m) twice-life-size figure standing upright, clothed in robes of the Order of the Garter. It is made out of Portland stone and was originally coated in wax to protect it against the weather. In Public Sculpture of North-East England, the expression of Earl Grey is described as "pensive". Baily also made 30 miniatures of the statue out of plaster, possibly intended as souvenirs.

During a thunderstorm on 25 July 1941, the head of the statue, which weighed around 102 kg (225 lb), (Note: Newcastle Journal article from 2 September 1941 states that the head weighed "about two cwt" (two hundredweight). According to The Units of Measurement Regulations 1995, 1 hundredweight = 50.8kg.) was knocked off by a bolt of lightning and fell onto the tram lines below the monument. One of the statue's arms and a portion of the cloak were also damaged. The Newcastle Estate and Property Committee agreed that the statue would not be repaired until after the Second World War, but the head would be retained and restored. In 1947, sculptor Roger Hedley created a new head based on the preserved fragments of the original.

=== Inscriptions ===
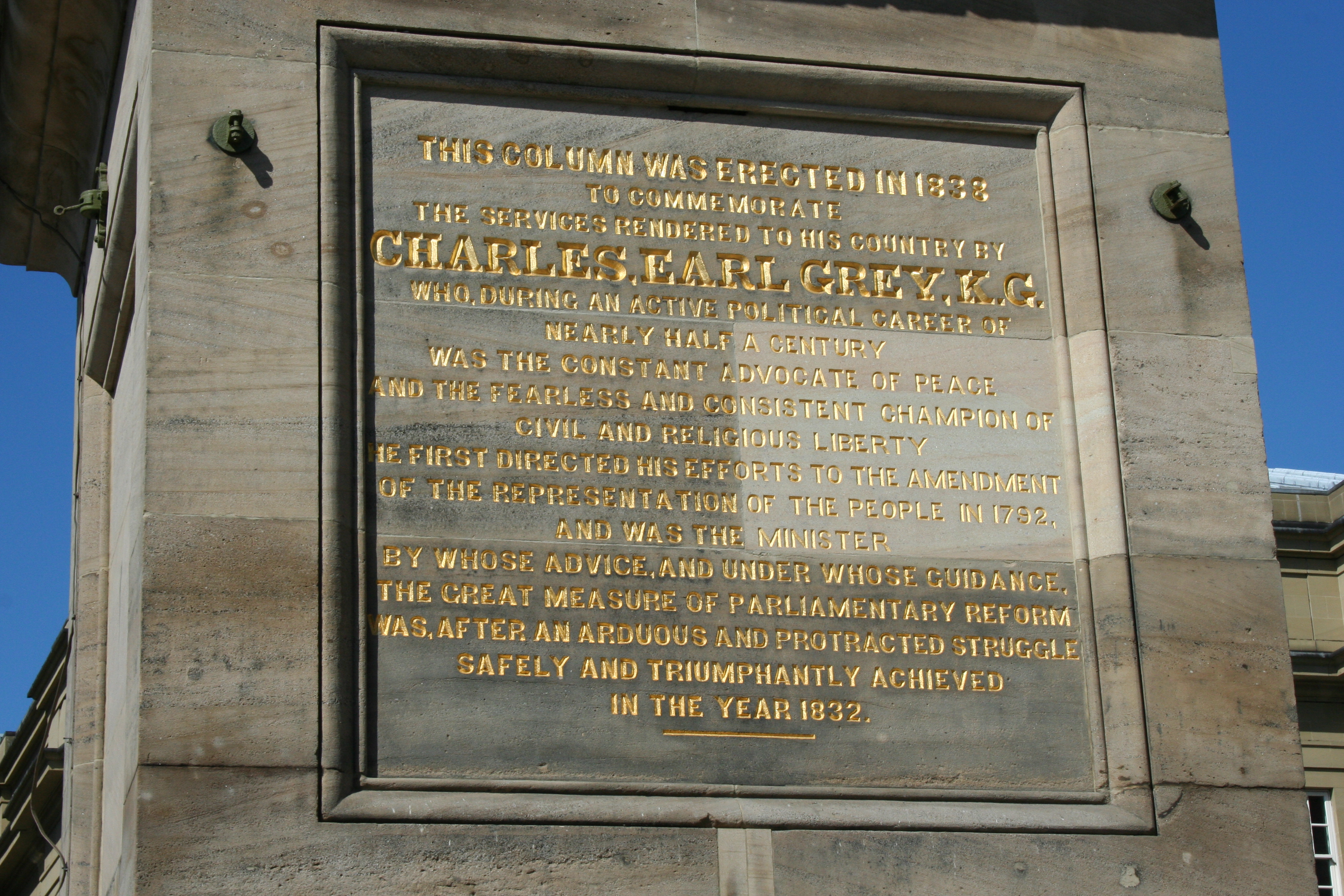
The base of the monument contains an inscription commemorating Earl Grey.

The main inscription on the south side of the pedestal was added in 1854 and was most likely written by Sydney Smith. It was installed by the Red Barns Marble Works of Gibson Street, Newcastle.

THIS COLUMN WAS ERECTED IN 1838
TO COMMEMORATE
THE SERVICES RENDERED TO HIS COUNTRY BY
CHARLES, EARL GREY, K.G.
WHO, DURING AN ACTIVE POLITICAL CAREER OF
NEARLY HALF A CENTURY
WAS THE CONSTANT ADVOCATE OF PEACE
AND THE FEARLESS AND CONSISTENT CHAMPION OF
CIVIL AND RELIGIOUS LIBERTY.
HE FIRST DIRECTED HIS EFFORTS TO THE AMENDMENT
OF THE REPRESENTATION OF THE PEOPLE IN 1792,
AND WAS THE MINISTER
BY WHOSE ADVICE, AND UNDER WHOSE GUIDANCE,
THE GREAT MEASURE OF PARLIAMENTARY REFORM
WAS, AFTER AN ARDUOUS AND PROTRACTED STRUGGLE
SAFELY AND TRIUMPHANTLY ACHIEVED
IN THE YEAR 1832.

On the opposite face is a later inscription from 1932, installed at the request of Sir Charles Trevelyan, 100 years after the passing of the Great Reform Act. The words of the inscription were written by Edward Grey.

AFTER A CENTURY OF CIVIL PEACE,
THE PEOPLE RENEW
THEIR GRATITUDE TO THE AUTHOR
OF THE GREAT REFORM BILL.
1932.

== Critical and public reception ==
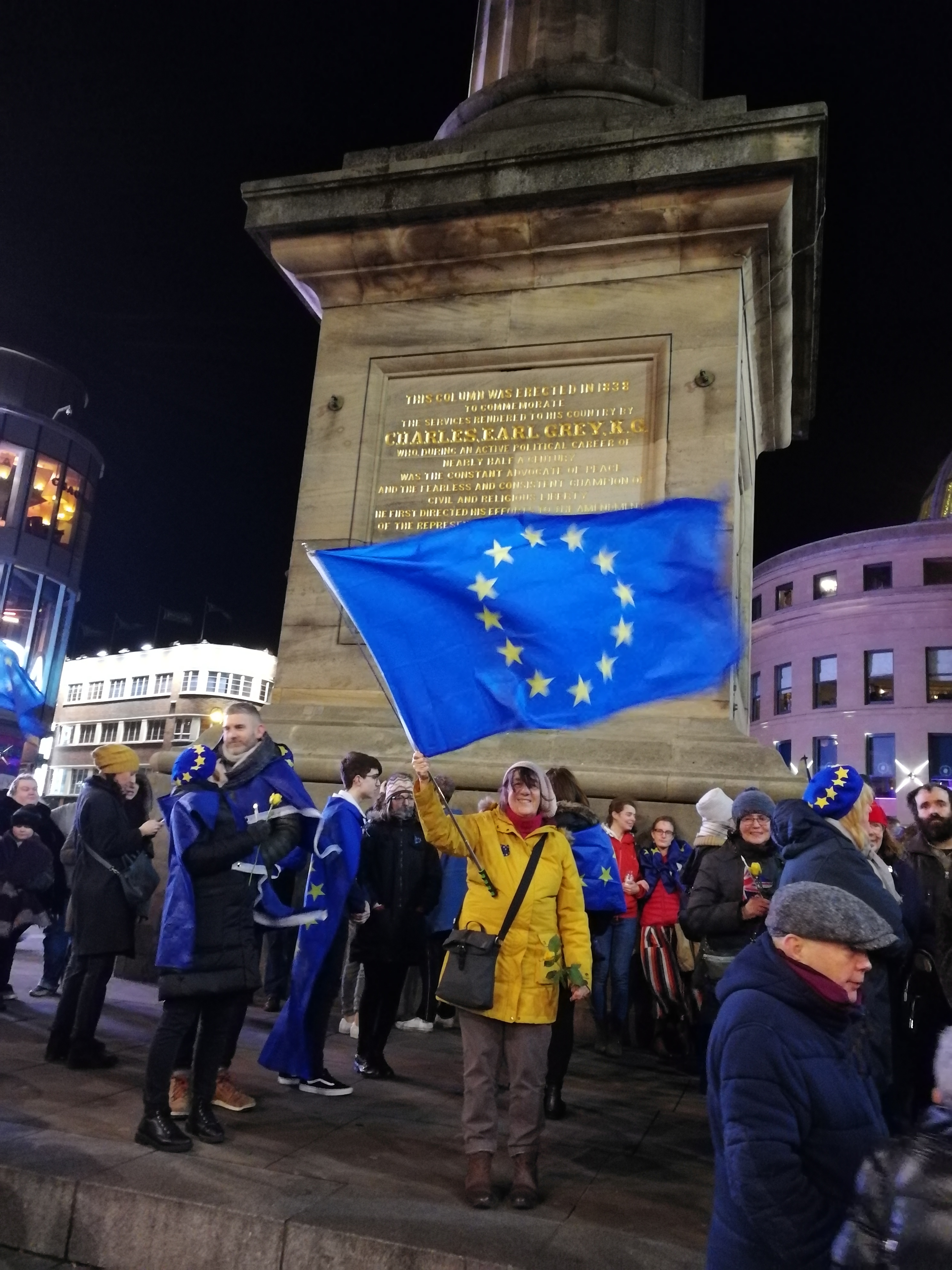
A vigil at Grey's Monument marking the exit of the United Kingdom from the European Union in 2020.

After the monument was completed it received praise from contemporary artists and writers. A column in The Mirror of Literature, Amusement, and Instruction in 1838 wrote that the statue "is a faithful representation of the noble Lord,—and esteemed a fine imaginative work of art". Also in 1838, The Spectator described the statue as "equal to any of Chantry's [sic]". Writing in Bradshaw's Journal in 1842, Alex Falkner wrote that the statue, "when seen from the centre of the street, has a most commanding appearance". In 1867, the author T. Fordyce described the statue of Earl Grey as "a noble effort of genius" which reflected "the highest credit on its accomplished author, Mr. Baily".

The monument was not universally acclaimed and it received criticism which lasted into the latter half of the 19th century. After the column was erected in August 1838, The Newcastle Journal wrote "Whatever may be the character of the Column as a work of art, it is certain that in its present situation, it will be a great nuisance, and that at no distant day its removal to a less objectionable site will be called for by the public". In 1857, a writer local to Newcastle wrote "the monument to Earl Grey is, to my mind, a huge mistake; you place an aged nobleman, dressed in court costume, on a high pillar, and, without a hat upon his bald head, expose him to the pelting of every storm that Heaven sends". Public interest and awareness of Earl Grey also decreased into and during the 20th century. In the 1920s, there were calls from the Durham Branch of the Surveyors' Institution to remove and relocate the monument, due to its growing obstruction of the traffic.

Grey's Monument became a Grade I listed building on 14 June 1954. In the second half of the 20th century there were multiple calls (in 1982, 1994 and 1998) for the monument to be renovated, but these were dismissed due to the estimated cost and recognition that previous repairs had led to long-term damage by pollution. The monument lends its name to Monument Metro station, on the Tyne and Wear Metro, opened in 1981 and located directly underneath the monument. The pedestrianised area around the monument is a popular meeting place and is regarded as a speakers' corner.

== See also ==
- Grade I listed buildings in Tyne and Wear
