= The Cluny =

Music venue in Newcastle upon Tyne, England

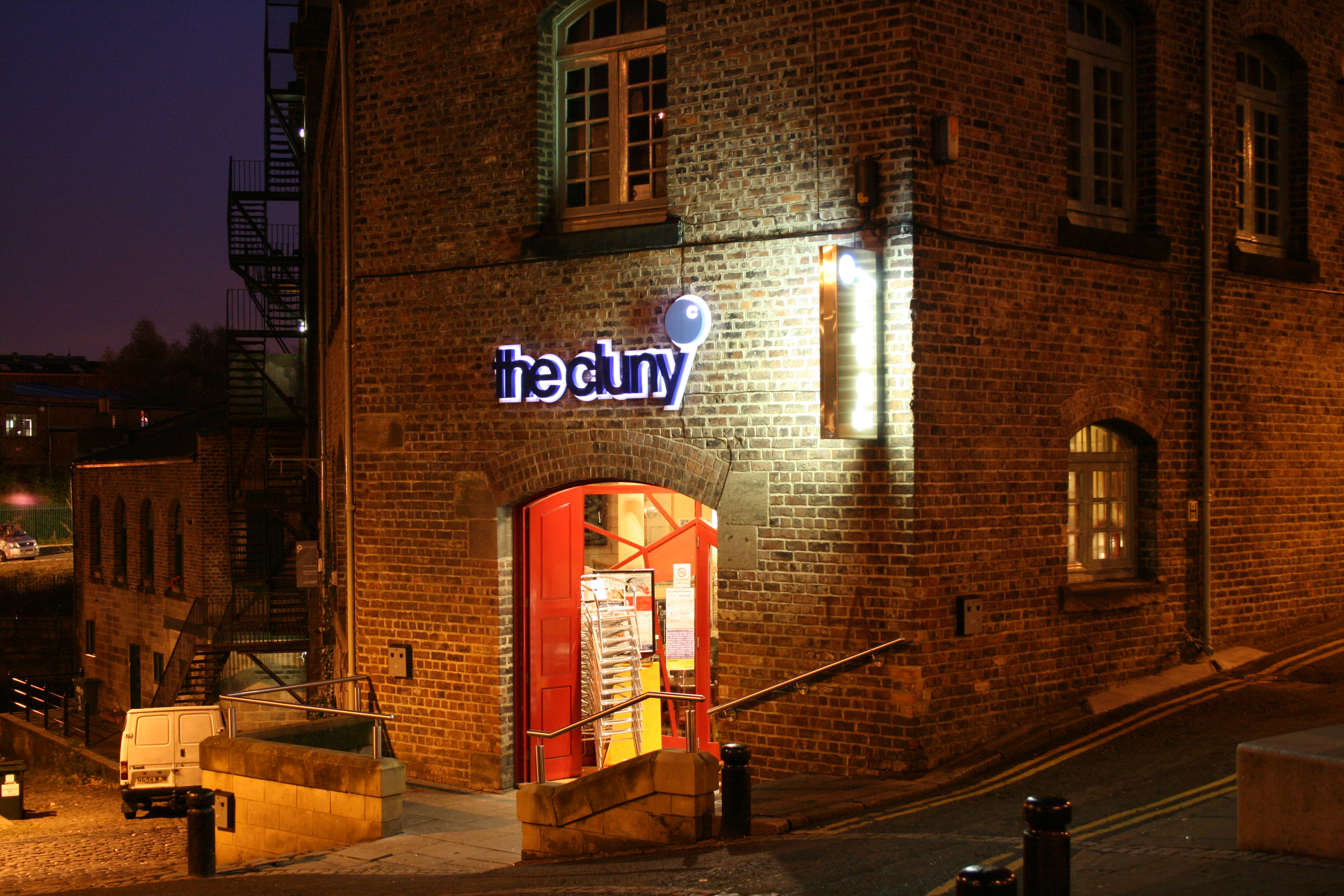
- Exterior of venue (c.2007)
- Interactive map of The Cluny
- Address: Lime Street; Newcastle upon Tyne NE1 8SF England
- Coordinates: 54°58′31″N 1°35′30″W
- Capacity: 300
- Type: Concert hall

Construction
- Opened: 1999

Website
- Venue Website

Listed Building – Grade II
- Official name: Cluny Warehouse
- Designated: 30 March 1987
- Reference no.: 1355264

The Cluny is a 300-capacity live music venue, pub and café, on Lime Street, in the Ouseburn Valley area of Newcastle upon Tyne, England. Based in a former flax spinning mill, The Cluny occupies part of the wider building at 36 Lime Street, sharing the space with artists, offices and recording studios. The Cluny is a regular fixture in the top 100 list of World's Best Bars.

== History ==
The building of 36 Lime Street was completed in 1848, when it was opened as a flax spinning mill. The building was commissioned by Messrs Plummer & Cooke and designed by John Dobson. Lasting just 12 years, it was re-opened in 1860 as a steam-powered flour mill by Henry Proctor & Co.

At some point in its history, the building became a Scotch whisky bottling plant called the Cluny, hence the current name. In 1982, Bruvvers Theatre Company purchased the building and it became an artists' space.

A section of the building was opened as The Cluny Bar in 1999, and the same space was taken over by The Head Of Steam Limited in November 2002, when its current incarnation came about. The Cluny now operates as a bar and live music venue, with food service provided by The Cluny Kitchen, and 36 Lime Street itself is a Grade II listed building.

In May 2009, it was announced that The Cluny would be taking over the running of the adjacent former Round Theatre, which went into liquidation in 2008.

== Location ==
The Cluny is located in Newcastle upon Tyne's Ouseburn Valley, an area of intense regeneration in the 21st century.

== Bar ==
The Cluny's bar is renowned for its huge selection of real ales and world lagers, and strives to use local and independent breweries wherever possible. The Cluny was one of only two pubs in Newcastle to make it into the 2004 Good Pub Guide.

== Venue ==
The Cluny has a live music venue that has been described as "one of the most important venues for breaking bands in the region".

From 1999 to 2003, Keith Morris and Charlie McGovern ran the influential weekly Schmazz jazz club at The Cluny, bringing radical performers like Gilad Atzmon and Reem Kelani to the city.

In 2002, Dannii Minogue played the venue in support of her single "Put The Needle On It".

The Arctic Monkeys performed there as part of a UK tour in August 2005.

On 20 January 2007, Maxïmo Park previewed their second album, Our Earthly Pleasures in its entirety at The Cluny.

In January 2008, as part of The JD Set, Peter Hook collaborated with The Wombats on a one-off live performance of their single Backfire at the Disco. A live recording of the song was released in April 2008, as a b-side on the single's re-release.

In February 2008, Duffy played at The Cluny, the gig coinciding with the Welsh singer's second week at number one with her single Mercy.

In November 2008, Solange Knowles, younger sister of Beyoncé Knowles, played at The Cluny as part of her first UK tour.

The folk rock band, Mumford & Sons, performed there as part of a UK tour in September 2009.

The New York Dolls, the pioneering punk rock band, performer at the Cluny in September 2013.

The rock band from Sunderland, Field Music, performed there in January 2020.

== Best Live Music Venue award ==
The Cluny was voted Best Live Music Venue by music development agency Generator North East in May 2009.

== See also ==
- Ouseburn
- Ouseburn Valley
