= Victoria Tunnel (Newcastle) =

Subterranean wagonway under Newcastle upon Tyne, England

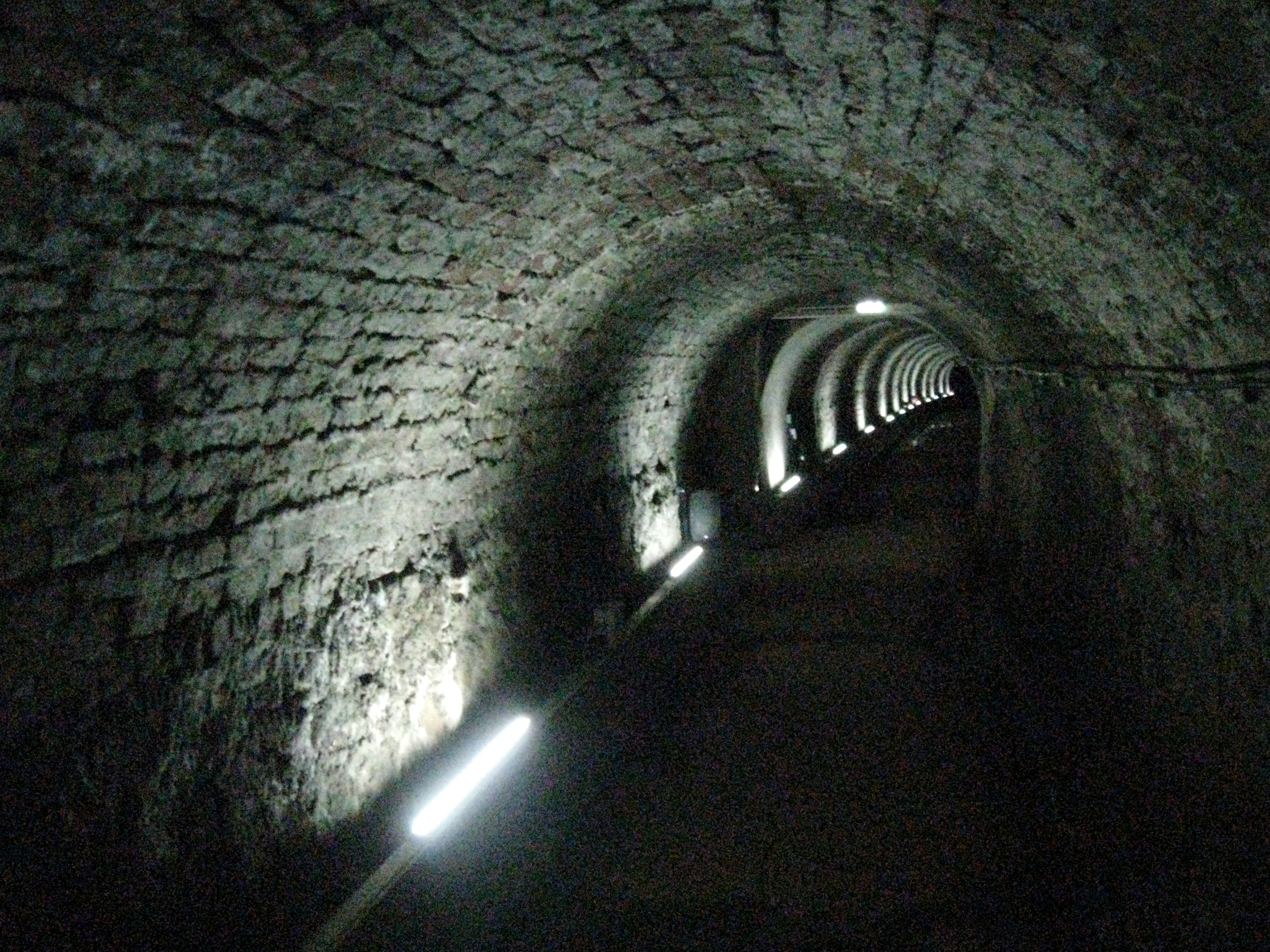
- A lit section of the Victoria Tunnel near the Ouse Street entrance
- Interactive map of Victoria Tunnel

Overview
- Location: Newcastle upon Tyne, England
- Start: Town Moor
- End: River Tyne

Operation
- Work began: 1839
- Opened: 7 April 1842

Technical
- Length: 2.25 miles (3.6 km)
- Min elevation: 26 meters

Location within Tyne and Wear

The Victoria Tunnel is a subterranean wagonway that runs under Newcastle upon Tyne, England, from the Town Moor down to the River Tyne. It was built between 1839 and 1842 to transport coal from Leazes Main Colliery in Spital Tongues, to riverside staithes (jetties), ready for loading onto boats for export.

The tunnel was driven through boulder clay, and formed by a base course of stone supporting a brick arch. Loaded wagons descended the incline of the tunnel under their own weight, and were rope-hauled back to the colliery by a stationary engine. The colliery closed in January 1860 and the tunnel was abandoned until the start of the Second World War, when it was converted for use as an air-raid shelter.

The tunnel is 2.4 miles (3.9 km) in length with a maximum depth of 85 feet (26 m) and drops 222 feet (68 m) from entrance to exit. It remains largely intact.

== History ==
=== Victorian wagonway ===
When it opened in 1835, the Leazes Main or Spital Tongues colliery was one of many coal mines around Newcastle. The Industrial Revolution demand for coal was high.

Initially, the coal was carried on carts from the colliery through the streets of Newcastle upon Tyne to the river for shipping. This was slow, as the town was largely in a medieval layout, with narrow cobbled streets (Grainger Town was in the early stages of construction) and expensive due to road taxes. Porter and Latimer, the colliery owners, employed a local engineer, William E. Gilhespie, to construct an underground wagonway. An overground wagonway following much the same route was mooted, but the Freemen of Newcastle would not give permission for tracks to be laid across the Town Moor. A more direct route to Elswick, about two miles (3 km) upstream from the mouth of the Ouseburn, was also ruled out, because the old Tyne Bridge prevented ships sailing beyond Newcastle (the Swing Bridge would not be built until 1873). Building a staithe here would require paying the keelmen to take the coal downstream of the bridge before it could be loaded into the colliers, thereby significantly reducing the profit margin on each load of coal shipped.

==== Construction ====
Permission to build the tunnel was granted in 1838 and work started the following year. The tunnel was probably dug in sections. The engineers would have excavated a shaft down to the right level then tunneled out to link up with the next section. John Cherry was appointed to manage the tunneling. He was a former Yorkshire Lead Miner who had previously been employed as a miner at the Leazes Main Colliery. Building works were carried out by the firm of David Nixon, a builder of Prudhoe Street, Newcastle upon Tyne. Some 200 workers were employed in the construction of the tunnel and Thomas Fordyce in his Local Records for 8 January 1842 reported:

The workmen, to the number of two hundred, were regaled with a substantial supper and strong ale, supplied by Mrs. Dixon, the worthy hostess of the Unicorn Inn, Bigg-market, Newcastle. The Albion band attended, and enlivened the joyous occasion with their music.

The walls of the tunnel were lined in stone, and a double brick arch supported the roof. It is approximately 7 ft 5 in (2.26 m) high and 6 ft 3 in (1.91 m) wide. This was just large enough to accommodate the custom-built chaldron wagons.

==== Transporting the coal ====
Because of the gradual gradient of the tunnel, loaded wagons were able to roll along a standard gauge rail track to the river. A rope was tied to the last wagon in the train and a stationary steam engine at the top of the tunnel hauled the empty wagons back up to the pithead.

==== Grand opening ====
The Victoria Tunnel was named after the popular, young Queen Victoria. It was officially opened by the Mayor of Newcastle on 7 April 1842. A crowd of spectators including the sheriff and important merchants gathered on the quayside and at 1 pm cannons were fired as a train of eight wagons appeared out of the tunnel. Four of the wagons contained coal, and the others a "company of ladies and gentlemen and a band of musicians".

==== Pit closure ====
The Victoria Tunnel was a financial success: it reduced the cost of transporting coal from the pit to the river by 88%. The colliery, however, was not a success and closed in 1860.

Having taken two and a half years to build, the tunnel was in use for just eighteen years.

=== Air raid shelter ===
As Britain prepared for war in 1939, the public were instructed to practise "Air Raid Precautions" to protect themselves from bombs dropped by the German Luftwaffe. In Newcastle, the city engineer developed plans to convert the Victoria Tunnel into a communal air raid shelter that could hold 9,000 people.

==== Converting the tunnel ====
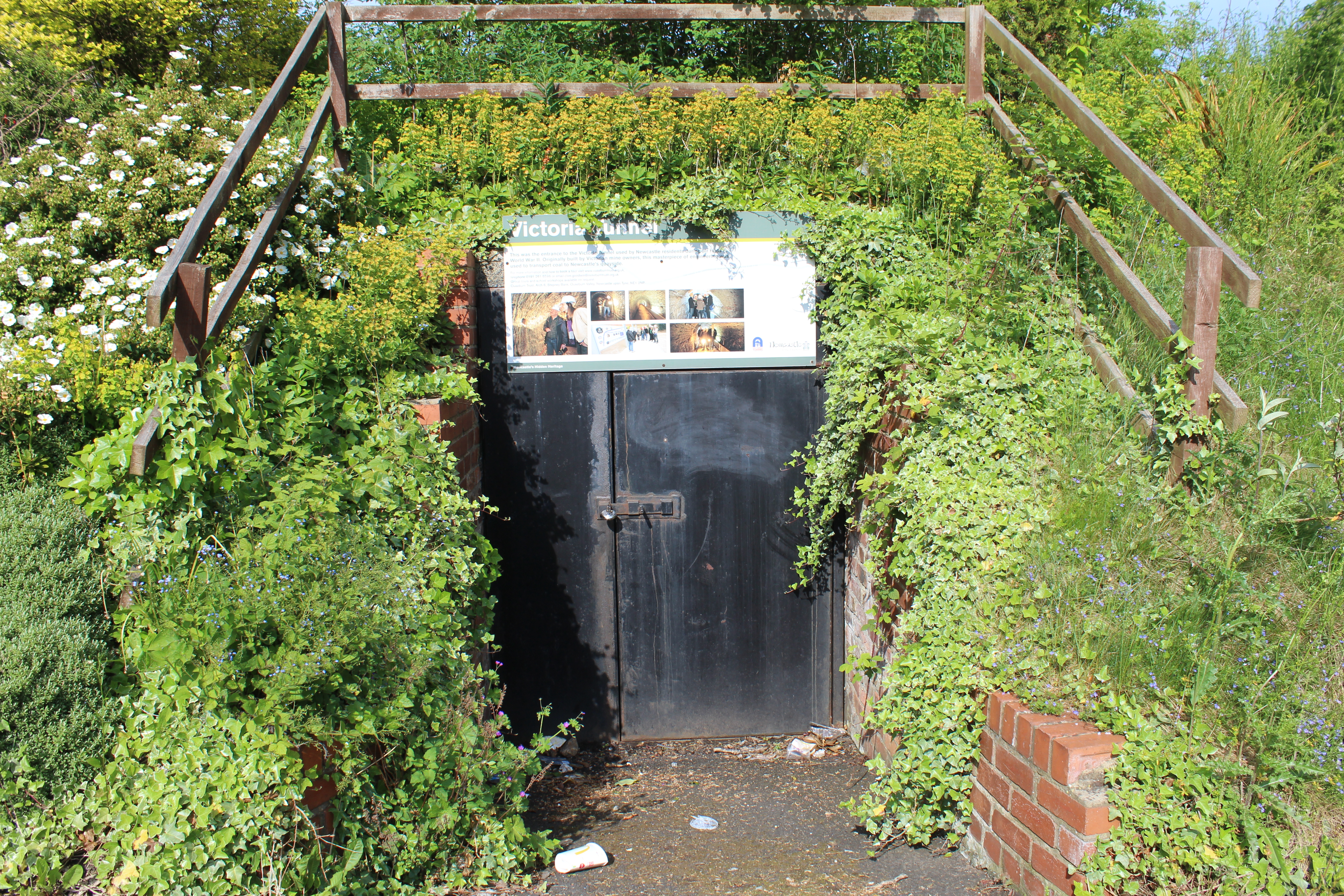
Entrance, Claremont Road.

Converting the tunnel into an air raid shelter cost £37,000. The tunnel was cleaned of coal dust and whitewashed in some places. Several concrete blast walls were added to stop potential bomb debris from entering the tunnel. Electric lighting was fitted and a new concrete floor was laid. Wooden benches and about 500 bunk beds were installed along the walls. Chemical toilets enclosed in canvas cubicles were built near the entrances.

Sixteen new entrances to the tunnel were originally planned, seven of which were added: Claremont Road, Hancock Museum, St Thomas' Churchyard, Ridley Place, Shieldfield Green, Crawhall Road, and Ouse Street. At Ouse Street, it was possible to walk directly into the tunnel, while the other access points looked similar to subway entrances and involved walking down a steep corridor.

==== Sheltering in the tunnel ====
The tunnel was considered a dark, damp, and uncomfortable place to shelter. Many people were afraid to use it. Those who did remember sitting with their families and neighbours, sang songs while waiting nervously for the all-clear from above.

==== After the war ====
At the end of the war, most of the fittings were removed from the tunnel and all of its entrances except Ouse Street were closed. This entrance had been built on private land in the garden of 14 Ouse Street.

== Timeline ==
- 1838: Porter and Latimer, the owners of the Leazes Main Colliery, are granted permission to build the tunnel. Work begins the following year.
- 1842: Construction finishes and the tunnel is opened with a cannon salute and a party for the workers in the Bigg Market.
- 1860: The pit closes, the equipment is sold and the tunnel is forgotten.
- 1878: The river end of the Victoria Tunnel is demolished when the Glass House Bridge is built.
- 1928: Gateshead entrepreneur Thomas Moore establishes the Victoria Tunnel Mushroom Company. He tries to farm mushrooms in the river end of the tunnel, but the business fails to grow and closes the following year.
- 1939: War breaks out and the tunnel is outfitted as an air raid shelter: several new entrances are built; bunk beds, benches, electric lighting, and chemical toilets are installed to make it more comfortable; and blast walls are erected inside the Tunnel to make it safe.
- 1945: The war ends and all the entrances except the one at Ouse Street are blocked. The tunnel is again left in darkness.
- 1954: The tunnel is considered as a potential nuclear shelter and plans are made to re-open the World War II entrances.
- 1976: Part of the tunnel is converted into a sewer running from Ellison Place to Queen Victoria Road.
- 2006: Newcastle City Council secures Heritage Lottery and Single Programme funding to restore the tunnel and open it to the public.
- 2010: Management is transferred to The Ouseburn Trust.

== Route ==
The Victoria Tunnel originally ran from the site of the Spital Tongues colliery near Hunters Road. It still exists under Claremont Road, and runs past the Hancock Museum, then close to the Civic Centre and St Mary's Place. From here it travels under Northumbria University City Campus, the Central Motorway and Shieldfield to St Dominic's Church on the corner of Crawhall Road and New Bridge Street. It then continues under St Ann's Estate to an entrance on Ouse Street. The section of tunnel that continued from here to the River Tyne was demolished in 1878.

== Tunnel statistics ==
Date opened	7 April 1842
Original length	2 1/4 miles (4 km)
Original height	7 feet 5 inches (2.26 metres)
Original width	6 feet 3 inches (1.91 metres)
Drop	222 feet (68 m)
Deepest point	85 feet (26 m)
Length accessible today	766 yards (700 m)

== Restoration ==
A 766-yard (700 m) section of the tunnel in the Ouseburn Valley is still accessible via a World War II entrance on Ouse Street. A programme of visits was first established by the Ouseburn Partnership in 1998. After a period of closure in 2006, Newcastle City Council carried out a programme of structural repairs and public safety measures, funded by the Heritage Lottery Fund and Tyne & Wear Partnership. The Victoria Tunnel Education Project developed a number of resources about the tunnel and organised public tours and school workshops from 2009. From 2010 the Ouseburn Trust has run guided tours.

A sound and light installation, commissioned from artist Adinda van 't Klooster, focuses on the themes of war, fear, and nuclear weapons, using the codenames of British military research projects as a backdrop.
