= Byker Bridge =

Road bridge in Newcastle, England

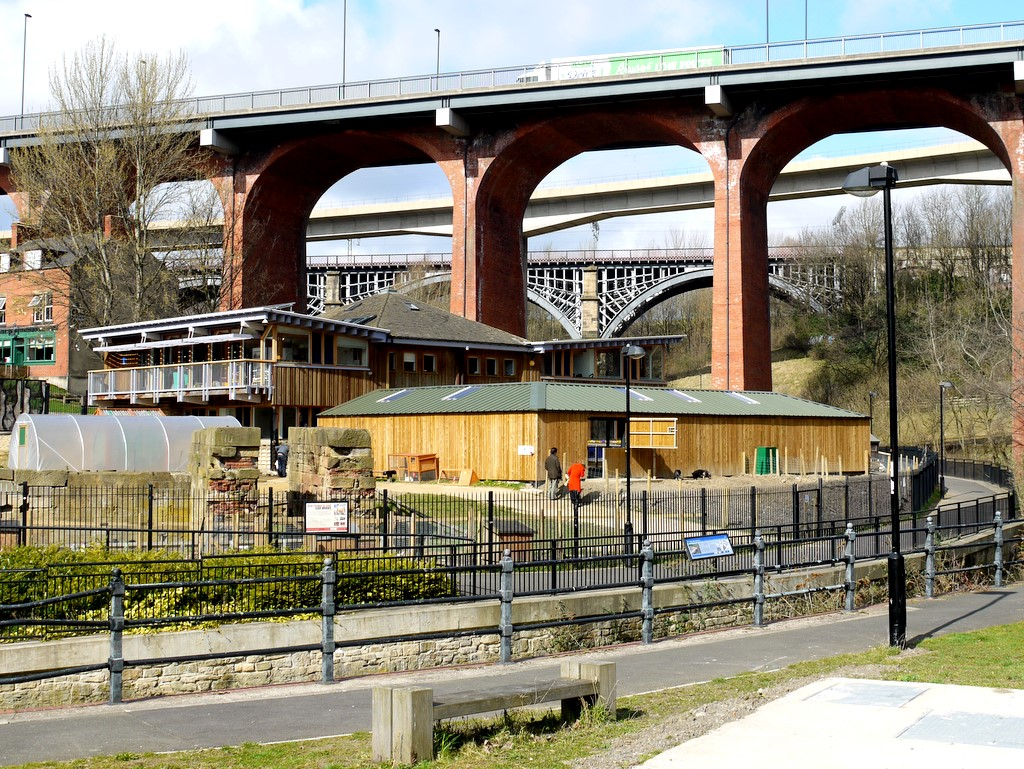
- The Byker Bridge, from the valley floor, with the Byker Viaduct and the Ouseburn Viaduct behind it.
- Coordinates: 54°58′32″N 1°35′33″W
- Carries: A193
- Crosses: Ouseburn
- Locale: Tyneside

Characteristics
- Design: Viaduct
- Material: Brick
- Total length: 1,130.7 ft (344.65 m)
- Width: 30.0 ft (9.14 m)
- No. of lanes: 3

History
- Opened: 19 October 1878; 146 years ago

The Byker Bridge is a 1,130.7 ft (344.65 m) long road bridge that carries the A193 road over the River Ouseburn in Newcastle upon Tyne. It carries traffic from the city centre and Central Motorway in the west, to the area of Byker to the east, over the lower Ouseburn valley, with the river emptying into the north side of the River Tyne, to the south.

The bridge was opened to pedestrians on 19 October 1878, and then to carts and carriages on 27 January 1879. There was originally a half penny toll, which was withdrawn on 12 April 1895. Originally 30.0 ft (9.15 m) wide, the bridge was widened to 50.0 ft (15.25 m) in 1899, by the addition of footpaths cantilevered out from the edge of the brickwork. The deck of the bridge was rebuilt during 1985/6 with the addition of pre-stressed concrete beams on cantilevers to support both footways and new crash barriers.

It is one of three high-level bridges in close proximity making the same crossing, with the Byker Metro Bridge and then the Ouseburn railway viaduct both to the north (the S-shaped Metro bridge crosses over the road bridge at its eastern end).
