= Byker Viaduct =

Railway bridge in Newcastle upon Tyne

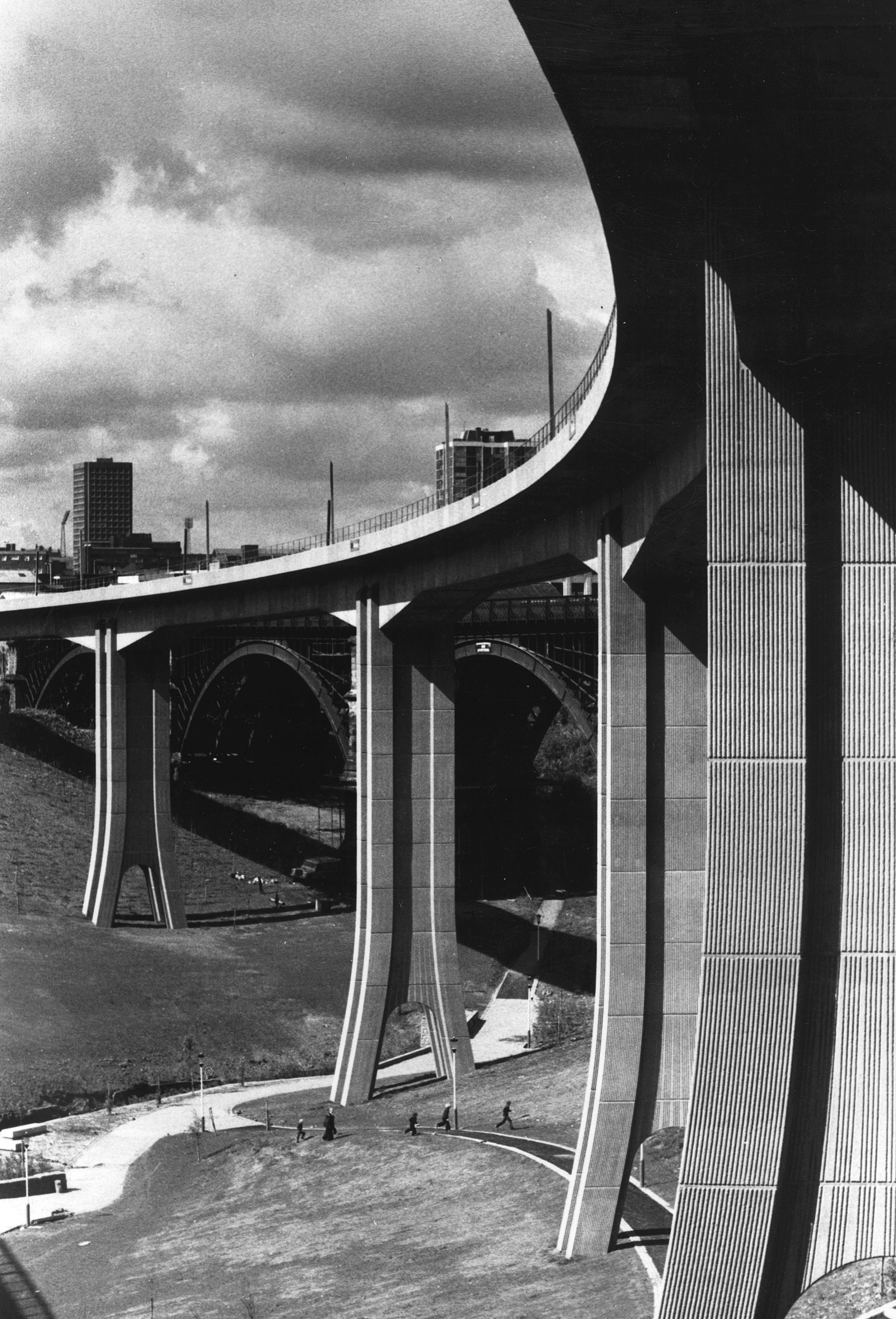
- The viaduct shortly after completion in 1979.
- Coordinates: 54°58′34″N 1°35′35″W
- Carries: Tyne and Wear Metro
- Crosses: Ouseburn
- Locale: Tyneside

Characteristics
- Design: Box girder bridge
- Material: Concrete
- Total length: 2,674 ft (815 m)
- Width: 27 ft (8.2 m)
- Clearance below: 98 ft (30 m)

History
- Designer: Ove Arup and Partners
- Constructed by: John Mowlem & Co Ltd
- Construction start: 1976; 49 years ago
- Construction end: 1979; 46 years ago
- Opened: 11 November 1982; 42 years ago

The Byker Viaduct (also known as the Byker Metro Bridge) is a 2,674 ft (815 m) curved S-shaped light railway bridge, which carries the Tyne and Wear Metro over the River Ouseburn in Newcastle upon Tyne. It carries the line from Manors Metro station in the city centre to the west, to Byker Metro station in the area of Byker to the east, over the lower Ouseburn valley, with the river emptying into the north side of the River Tyne, to the south. It was one of two major bridges built specifically for the Tyne and Wear Metro, the other being the Queen Elizabeth II Bridge crossing the River Tyne.

It is one of three high level bridges in close proximity making the same crossing, with the Ouseburn railway viaduct to the north and the Byker road bridge to the south. The bridge and elevated section form an S-curve, which takes the track over the Byker road bridge at its east end.

== History ==
The Byker Viaduct was built specifically to carry the then-planned Tyne and Wear Metro across the Ouseburn Valley, permitting a direct connection between the centre of Newcastle and the east end of the city and the coastal areas beyond. It was designed by Ove Arup and Partners and constructed by Mowlem. It was a notable structure for the era, being the first such structure in Britain to be built using cantilevered concrete sections with joints glued with epoxy resin.

The viaduct was one of the largest challenges in terms of civil engineering in the construction of the whole Metro system. This was in part due to the terrain, which not only comprised a densely populated area along with the need to accommodate a future road alignment, but also featured geology challenges in the form of faults and multiple coal seams directly beneath the site that present design challenges.

During June 1976, construction work on the viaduct commenced; it would take three years to complete. Initial work was focused on the erection of the reinforced concrete piers, the highest of which being roughly 70 meters above the ground. Towards the base of each pier, they flared outwards.

A total of 253 concrete segments, each one weighing 40 tonnes, were cast on-site prior to being lifted into place using a crane and secured using an epoxy resin and steel cables. The slopes of the valley prevented the effective use of a straightforward winch on the deck itself.

Each web of the structure feature multiple large unreinforced shear keys, the 2.2m deep segments have three keys per web while up to five keys are used on the deeper sections. A complete span could be erected on temporary supports using only bar prestressing, after which the cables were threaded and stressed. The plateau section comprises eight short spans.

The track comprised continuously welded rails laid upon reinforced concrete slabs with discreet rubberised pads in between and secured using Pandrol clips; deployed by a slipform paver, these had a specified tolerance of 3mm in 3m. The surface of the deck was waterproofed after the track slabs were laid using a spray-on compound.

On 11 November 1982, the viaduct was opened to traffic as part of the St James to Tynemouth section of the Metro. The completed bridge is 27 ft (8.2 m) wide, and carries standard gauge double tracks up to 30 m (98 ft) above the ground, with 18 spans up to 226 ft (69 m) long; six of the spans are over the river valley, with the remainder continuing on the east side of the valley as a lower elevated section.

During early 2017, a series of weekend closures of the viaduct were enacted so that a planned replacement of the track could be conducted.
