= Willington Dene Viaduct =

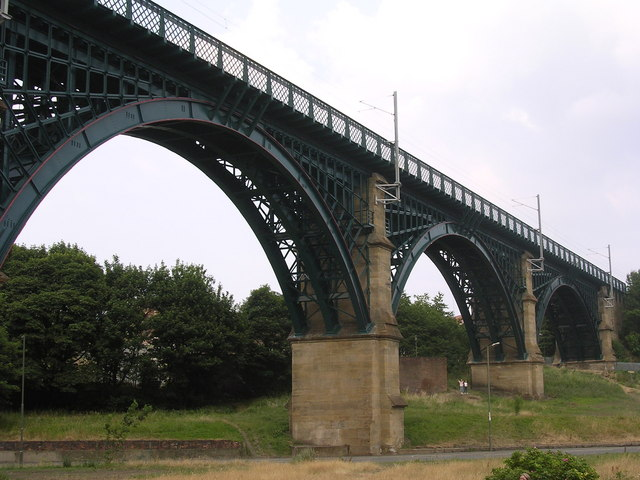
- Willington Dene Viaduct
- Coordinates: 54°59′39″N 1°30′17″W
- Carries: Tyne and Wear Metro
- Crosses: Wallsend Burn
- Locale: Wallsend, Tyne and Wear, England

History
- Opened: 18 June 1839

Location
- Interactive map of Willington Dene Viaduct

Willington Dene Viaduct (or simply Willington Viaduct) is a railway bridge at Wallsend, near Newcastle upon Tyne, in north-eastern England. Its seven arches were built in timber in 1839 and later replaced with wrought iron in a near-identical pattern. It is a Grade II listed building and now carries the Tyne and Wear Metro. Its construction is nearly identical to the nearby Ouseburn Viaduct.

== History ==
The viaduct was built from 1837 to 1839 for the Newcastle and North Shields Railway, the first railway line into Newcastle. To reach the city, it built Willington Dene Viaduct and the very similar Ouseburn Viaduct to carry the line over two valleys to the east. Willington crosses the Wallsend Burn around four miles (6.5 kilometres) from Newcastle, between Wallsend and Howdon. Both viaducts were designed by the architects John and Benjamin Green. When built, the viaduct was in laminated timber, using the Wiebeking system—one of the earliest British viaducts to do so. The timber beams were replaced with wrought iron spans from the Weardale Iron and Coal Company in a near-identical pattern from 1867 to 1869. The viaduct is a Grade II listed building, first designated 19 February 1986, and now carries the Tyne and Wear Metro light rail system. The success of the timber spans led other engineers to use the technique, though few such structures survive.

== Design ==
The viaduct is 349 yards (319 metres) long and consists of seven arches—one of 128 feet (39 metres) span, four of 120 feet (37 metres), and the remaining two of 115 feet (35 metres). It reaches a maximum height of 82 feet (25 metres). The arches were originally constructed from laminated timber beams, glued together (glulam) in a technique pioneered by the Bavarian engineer Carl Friedrich von Wiebeking, rather than held together mechanically by nails or bolts, as was more common. The wooden beams consisted of 14 layers of timber measuring 22 × 3 1/2 inches (56 × 9 cm), which were held in place with trenails. The 128-foot arch was a record for a timber span when it was built. The arches were rebuilt in wrought iron in 1869 but fabricated to give the viaduct a very similar appearance.

The Greens proposed a similar timber viaduct to span the River Tyne in Newcastle city centre but the scheme never came to fruition.
