= Lintzford =

Coordinates: 54.9093°N 1.7661°W

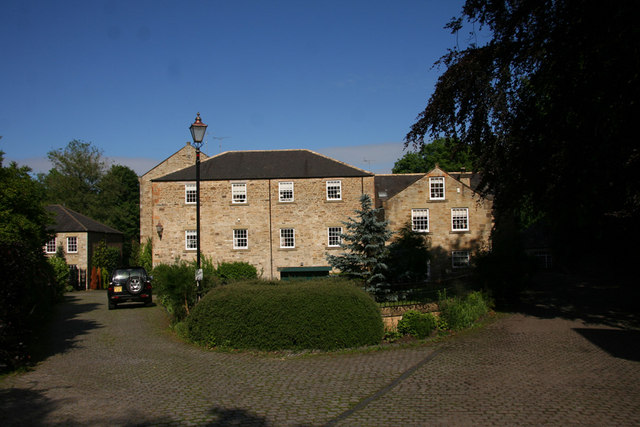
House at Lintzford converted from part of an ink works

Lintzford is a village on the River Derwent, which forms the boundary between County Durham and Tyne and Wear, England.

Located along the A694 road between Consett to the south west and Rowlands Gill to the north east, the village is renowned for its beauty, derived from nearby streams, forests and open fields, and the typical English cottage houses that surround it. Hamsterley Mill lies to its south west and an unclassified road to the south leads to High Spen. Burnopfield and the Lintz lie up the top of the hill to the south. The River Derwent here forms the actual boundary between the counties of Tyne and Wear and County Durham.

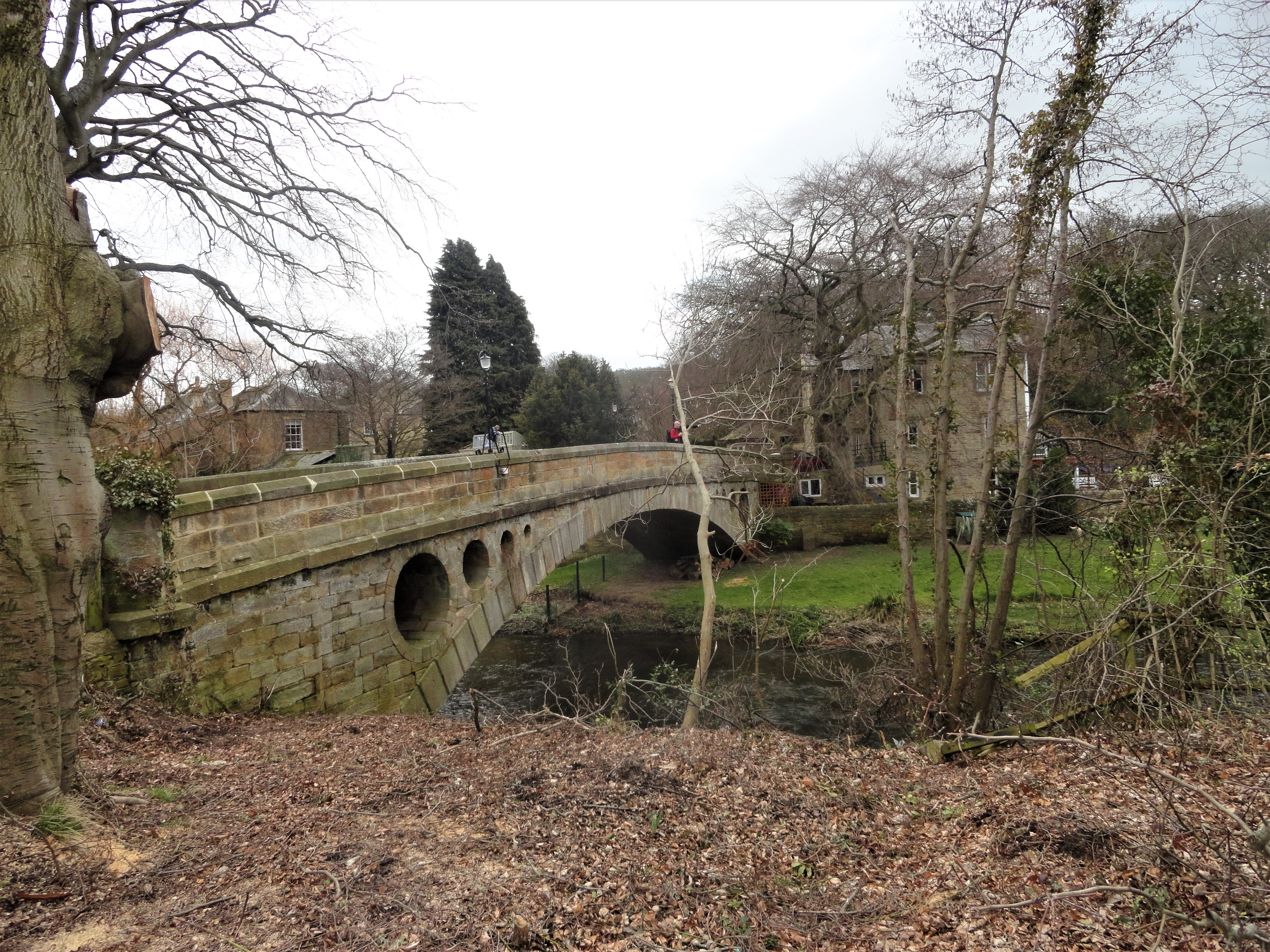
Lintzford Bridge, designed and built by John Green, crossing the River Derwent.

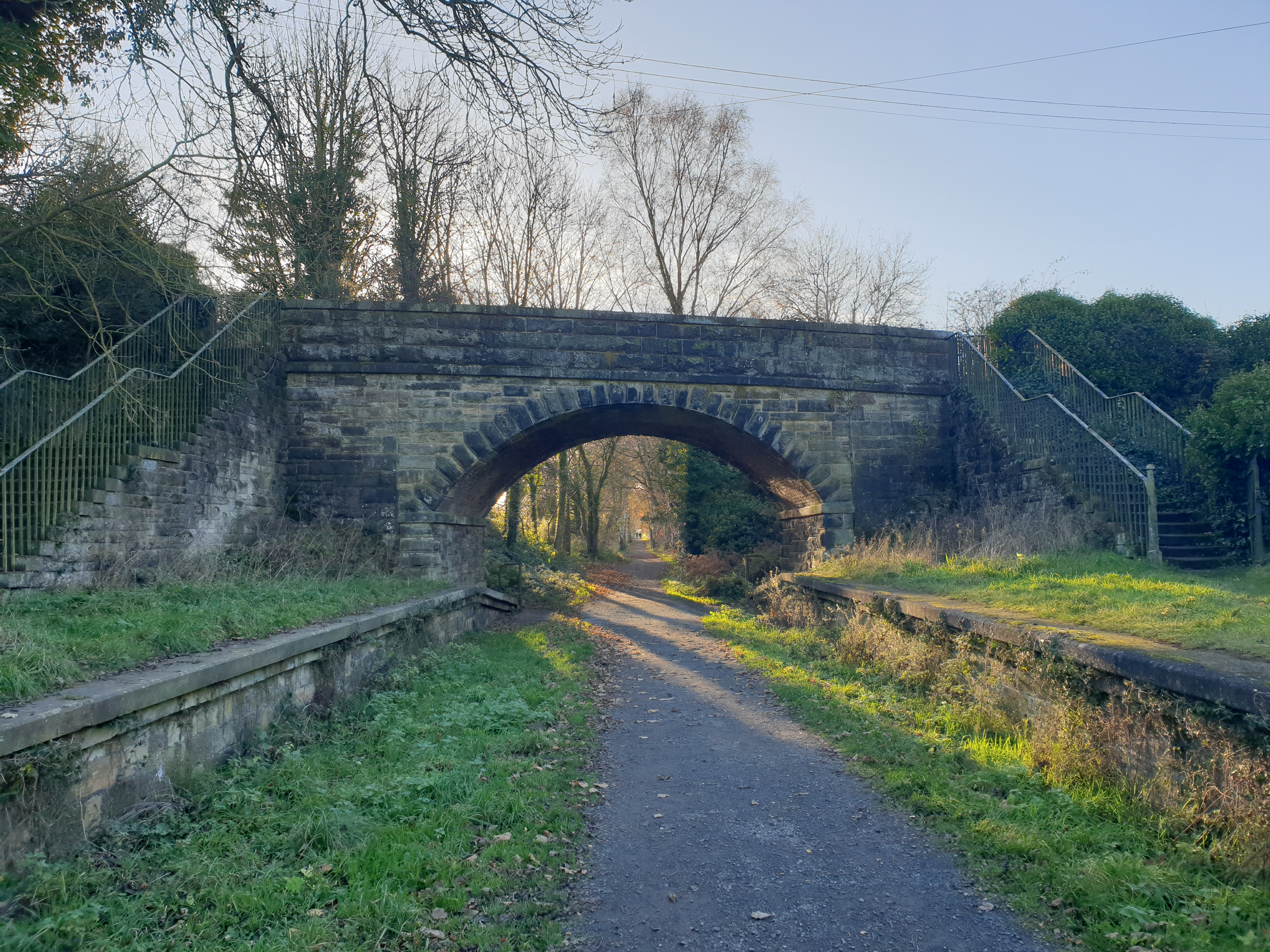
Old railway bridge over the Derwent Walk at Linzford Station

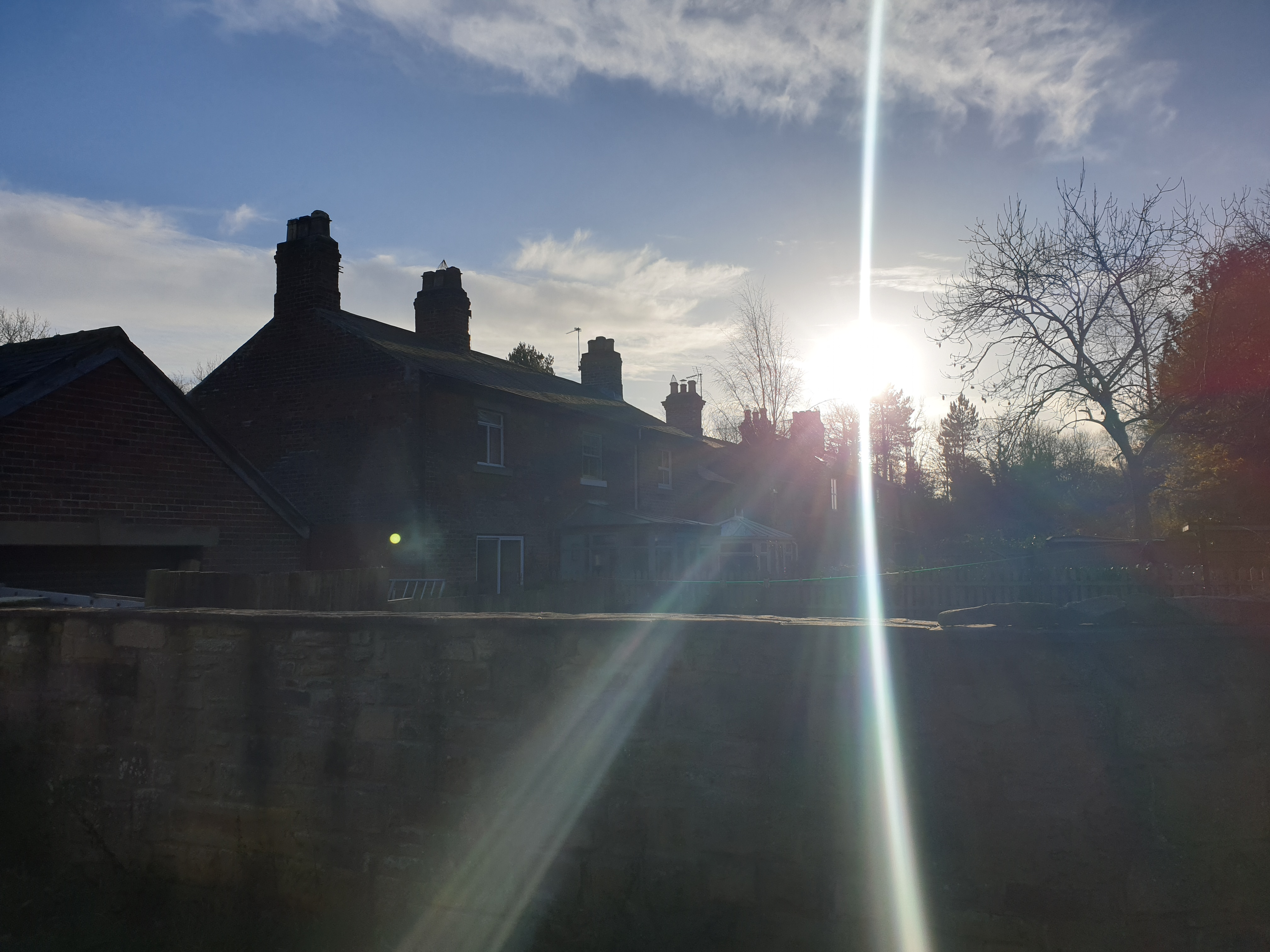
Terrace street at Linzford Station

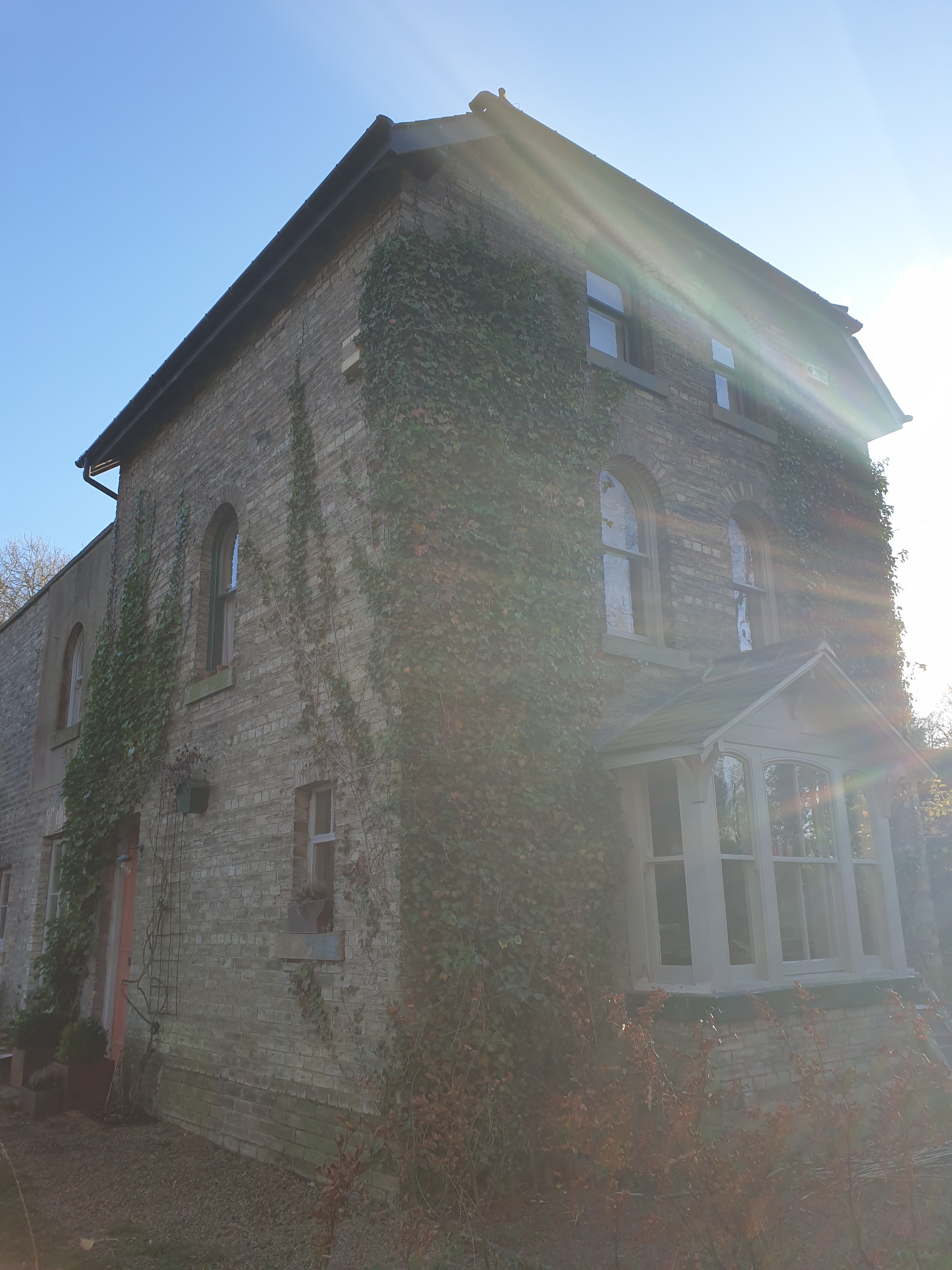
Linzford Station - Old Station House

Linzford Station can be found up a public footpath heading south east from the village on the Derwent Walk and is a short uphill walk after crossing Lintzford Bridge. There is no direct vehicular access, with easiest access via the A694 to the south west to Hamsterly Mill, the a double-left onto the B6310 towards nearby Burnopfield before turning onto the unpaved Lintz Green Road before reaching Burnopfield.

The place name Lintz is taken from the Old English “hlinc” meaning rising ground, ridge, or bank which does describe the geography of the area. Described in 1137 as Lincestrete and Lince, other variations include Linz, Lynce, Lynz, and Lynths.

The single-span bridge linking Linzford with the Newcastle road was designed and built 1834–5, by John Green.

Its population was approximately 200 according to the last census.
