= Carham railway station =

Disused railway station in Roxburgh, Scottish Borders

Carham
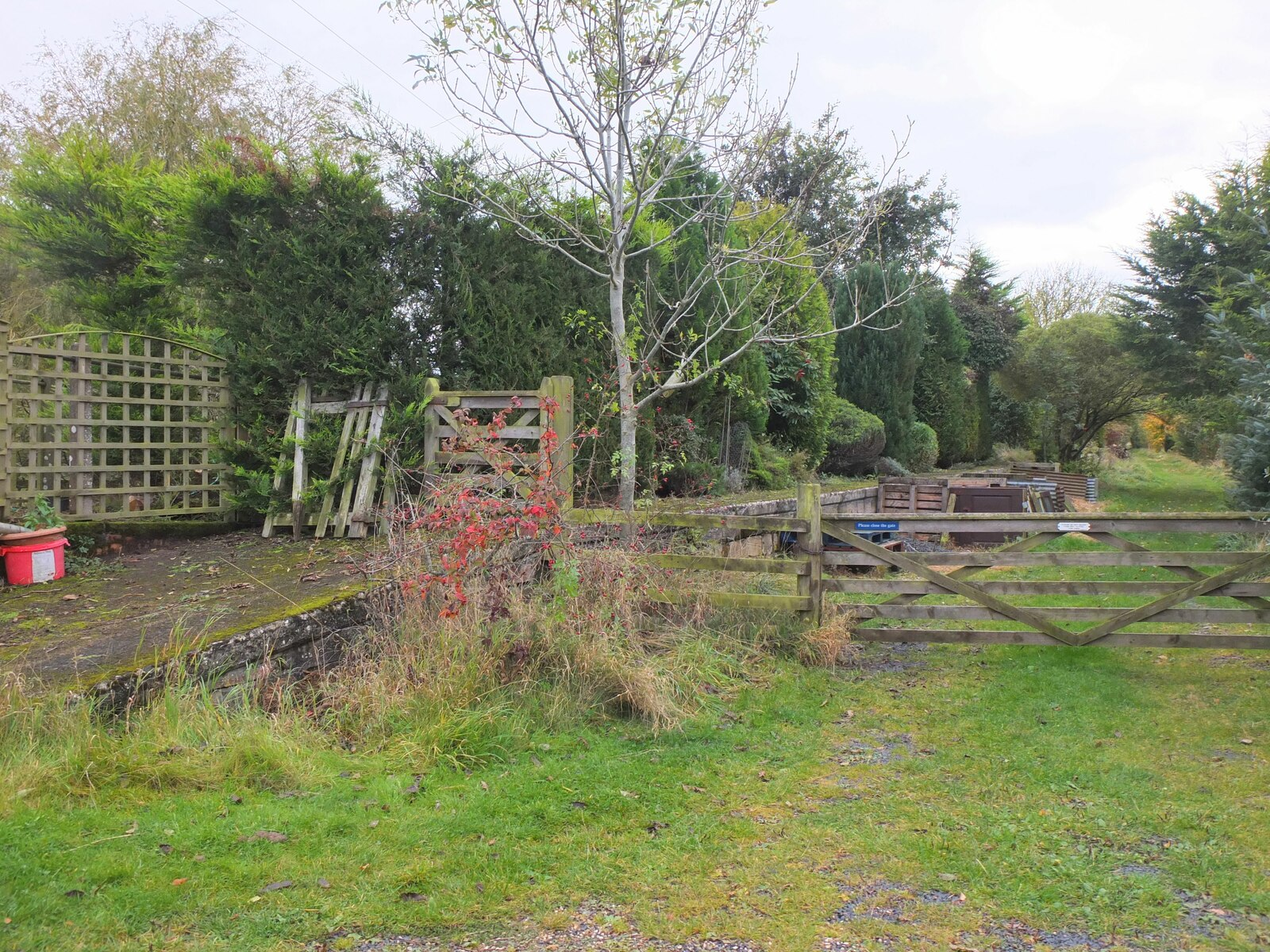
- The former westbound platform of the station in 2020

General information
- Location: Roxburghshire, Scottish Borders; Scotland
- Coordinates: 55.62683°N 2.33376°W
- Grid reference: NT792372
- Platforms: 2

Other information
- Status: Disused

History
- Original company: York, Newcastle and Berwick Railway
- Pre-grouping: North Eastern Railway
- Post-grouping: LNER; British Railways (Scottish Region)

Key dates
- 27 July 1849: Opened
- 4 July 1955: Closed to passengers
- 18 May 1964: Closed to goods
Location

Carham railway station was located in the historic county of Roxburghshire, Scotland, from 1849 to 1964 on the Kelso Branch. It served the village of Carham in Northumberland, England.

== History ==
The station opened on 27 July 1849 by the York, Newcastle and Berwick Railway. It was situated on a minor lane on the B6350. Even though the station was named Carham, it was located in Roxburghshire, being 3 quarters of a mile from the village. To the east was the goods yard and Shidlaw Tile Works, which was served by a siding near the two limekilns to the south. The works closed in 1898. A signal box was built in 1880 but it was replaced by another in 1903 to the southwest of the level crossing. The final passenger train called at the station on 2 July 1955 and passenger trains officially ceased two days later. It closed to goods on 18 May 1964.

Preceding station	Disused railways	Following station
Sprouston; Line and station closed	York, Newcastle and Berwick Railway; Kelso Branch	Sunilaws; Line and station closed
