= Sprouston railway station =

Disused railway station in Sprouston, Scottish Borders

Sprouston

General information
- Location: Sprouston, Scottish Borders; Scotland
- Coordinates: 55.6106°N 2.3841°W
- Grid reference: NT759352
- Platforms: 2

Other information
- Status: Disused

History
- Original company: York, Newcastle and Berwick Railway
- Pre-grouping: North Eastern Railway
- Post-grouping: LNER; British Rail (Scottish Region)

Key dates
- 27 July 1849: Opened
- 4 July 1955: Closed to passengers
- 25 January 1965: Closed to goods
Location

Sprouston railway station served the village of Sprouston, Scottish Borders, Scotland, from 1849 to 1965 on the Kelso Branch.

== History ==
The station opened on 27 July 1849 by the York, Newcastle and Berwick Railway. It was situated on an unnamed road on the B6350. An engine shed was built in 1863 but it was destroyed in a gale in 1881. A replacement was quickly built by the NER but it was built out of brick instead of timber. Initially, there were four sidings to the northeast as well as a coal and lime depot. One of the sidings served a goods shed which was behind the station. A signal box opened in the 1880s but it was replaced in 1912 with a new one on the downside. On 1 March 1940 it was downgraded to a ground frame. The engine shed closed in 1916 as a wartime economy measure but it wasn't demolished until the 1960s. The last train called at the station on 2 July 1955 but official passenger closure happened two days later on 4 July 1955. It remained open for goods until 25 January 1965.

Preceding station	Disused railways	Following station
Kelso; Line and station closed	North Eastern Railway; Kelso Branch	Carham; Line and station closed
