= Sunilaws railway station =

Disused railway station in Carham, Northumberland

Sunilaws
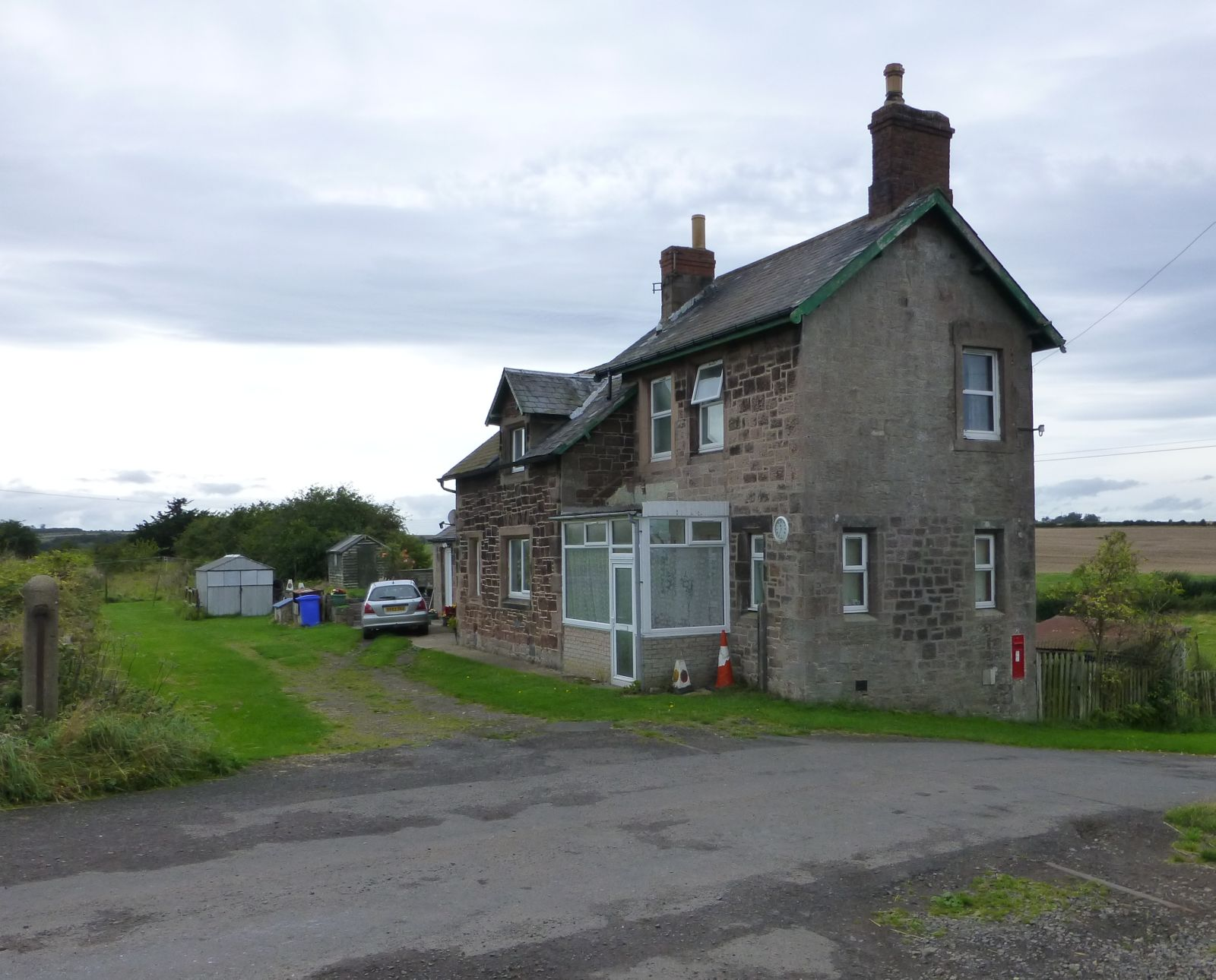
- The site of the station in 2016

General information
- Location: Carham, Northumberland; England
- Coordinates: 55.6302°N 2.2783°W
- Grid reference: NT825374
- Platforms: 2

Other information
- Status: Disused

History
- Original company: York, Newcastle and Berwick Railway
- Pre-grouping: North Eastern Railway
- Post-grouping: LNER; British Railways (North Eastern Region)

Key dates
- July 1859: Opened as Wark
- 1 October 1871: Name changed to Sunilaws
- 4 July 1955: Closed to passengers
- 29 March 1965: Closed to goods
Location

Sunilaws railway station served the parish of Carham, Northumberland, England, from 1859 to 1965 on the Kelso Branch.

== History ==
The station was opened as Wark in July 1859 by the York, Newcastle and Berwick Railway. It was situated on a minor lane to the south of a junction on the B6350. Despite the station's name upon opening, the village of Wark on Tweed was situated almost a mile north, while the station was located in Carham. On 1 October 1871 its name was changed to Sunilaws, which was the name of a nearby farm but was spelled as 'Sunnylaws' until 1924, when it adopted the station's spelling. The signal box opened in 1880 but it was replaced in 1901 and it was located between the timber shelter on the down platform and the level crossing. On the up side of the line was a coal yard and opposite the level crossing was a siding, which served a loading bank. The station closed to passengers on 4 July 1955 and to goods traffic on 29 March 1965.

Preceding station	Disused railways	Following station
Carham; Line and station closed	York, Newcastle and Berwick Railway; Kelso Branch	Coldstream; Line and station closed
