= Hallington, Northumberland =

Hamlet in Northumberland, England

Coordinates: 55.076848°N 2.0255280°W

Hallington
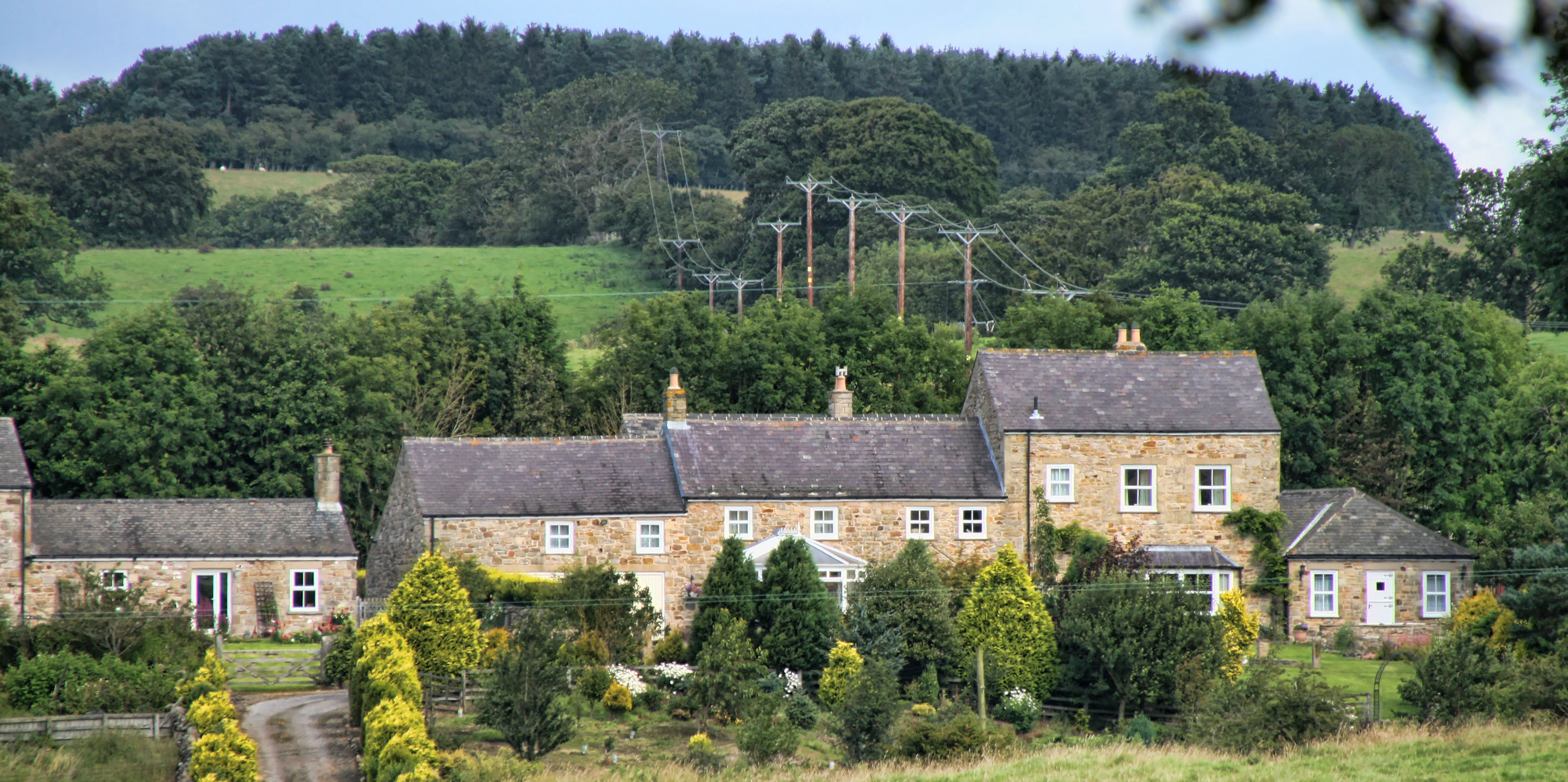

- Location within Northumberland
- Civil parish: Whittington
- Unitary authority: Northumberland
- Shire county: Northumberland
- Region: North East
- Country: England
- Sovereign state: United Kingdom
- Police: Northumbria
- Fire: Northumberland
- Ambulance: North East

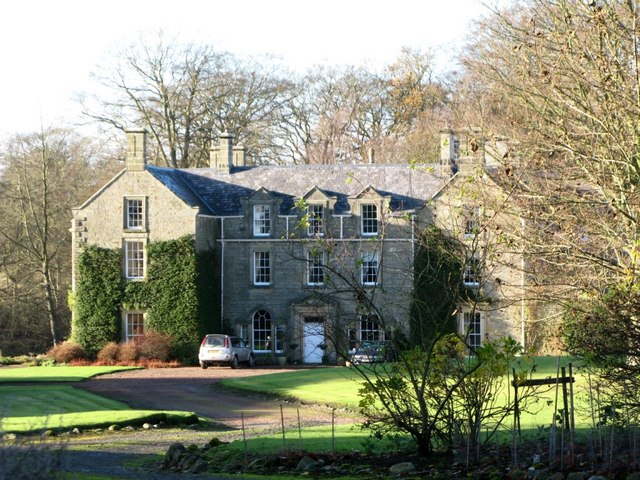
Hallington Hall

Hallington is a hamlet and former civil parish about 9 miles from Hexham, now in the parish of Whittington, in the county of Northumberland, England. In 1951 the parish had a population of 75.

== History ==
The name "Hallington" means 'Holy valley'. There are no remains of the deserted medieval village of Hallington above ground. Hallington was formerly called "Haledon" and "Halydon". Hallington was formerly a township in St. John Lee parish, from 1866 Hallington was a civil parish in its own right until it was abolished on 1 April 1955 to form Whittington.

== See also ==
- Hallington Reservoirs
