= Ouseburn Viaduct =

Railway bridge in Newcastle-upon-Tyne, England

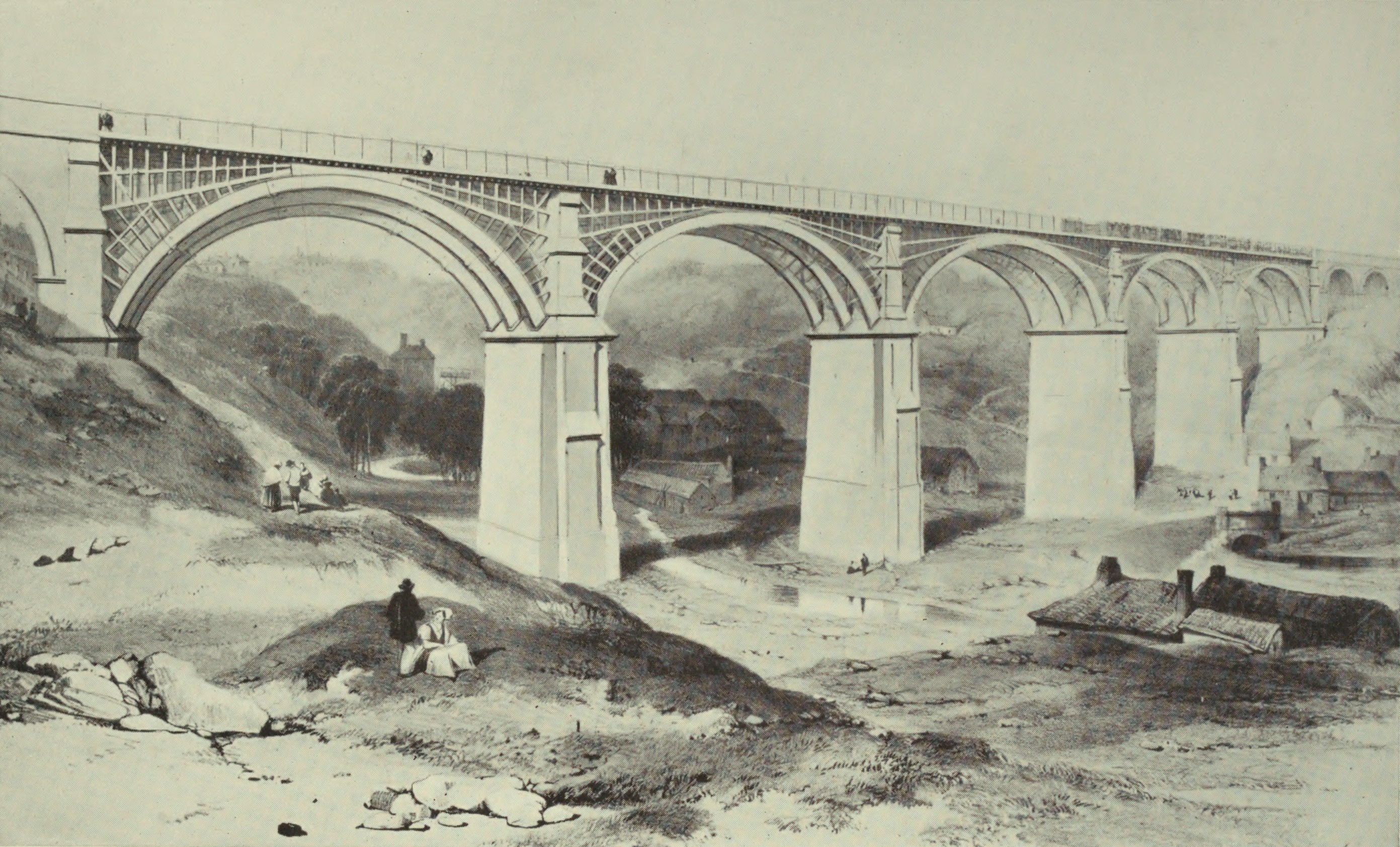
- Ouseburn Viaduct, 1915
- Coordinates: 54°58′35″N 1°35′35″W
- Carries: East Coast Main Line
- Crosses: Ouseburn Valley
- Locale: Newcastle-upon-Tyne, England
- Heritage status: Grade II* listed

History
- Architect: John and Benjamin Green
- Opened: 18 June 1839

Location
- Interactive map of Ouseburn Viaduct

Ouseburn Viaduct is a railway bridge in the East End of Newcastle-upon-Tyne, England. It carries the East Coast Main Line over the Ouseburn Valley just east of the city centre. Designed by architects John and Benjamin Green, it was originally built with timber arches in 1839 for the Newcastle and North Shields Railway. The arches were replaced with near-identical wrought iron spans 30 years later. It is a Grade II* listed building.

== Design ==
The viaduct is 360 yards (330 metres) long. It crosses the Ouseburn, a minor tributary of the River Tyne, and its valley on five arches, reaching a maximum height of 108 feet (33 metres) from the base of the piers to the rails. Three of the arches have a span of 116 feet (35 metres) each and the remaining two span 114 feet (35 metres) each, with a maximum rise of 32 feet 6 inches (10 metres). The viaduct is approached on either side by a pair of smaller stone arches, one of which is on a skew across Stepney Road. Ouseburn is taller and has fewer arches than the Willington Dene Viaduct, built for the same railway a few miles further east at Wallsend, but is otherwise of a very similar design. The arches are supported on sandstone ashlar piers which are heavily sloped and buttressed and have decorative coping.

The arches were originally constructed from laminated timer beams, glued together (glulam) in a technique pioneered by the Bavarian engineer Carl Friedrich von Wiebeking, rather than held together mechanically by nails or bolts, as was more common. The wooden beams consisted of 14 layers of timber measuring 22 × 3 1/2 inches (56 × 9 cm), which were held in place with trenails. They were replaced with near-identical arches in wrought iron in 1869.

== History ==
The viaduct was first built between 1837 and 1839 for the Newcastle and North Shields Railway, the first railway line into Newcastle. It was the work of architects John and Benjamin Green, who were also responsible for Willington Dene. The arches were rebuilt in wrought iron between 1867 and 1869 by the Weardale Iron & Coal Company to the designs of engineer Thomas Elliot Harrison for the North Eastern Railway Company (NER), the successor to the Newcastle and North Shields Railway. At the same time, the NER was quadruple-tracking this section of line and so doubled the width of the viaduct. The route is now part of the East Coast Main Line.

The success of the timber spans led other engineers to use the technique, though few such structures survive. The Greens proposed a similar timber viaduct to span the River Tyne in Newcastle city centre but the scheme never came to fruition. Ouseburn Viaduct is the northernmost of three high-level bridges crossing the valley in close proximity—the Byker road bridge is the furthest south and the Byker Viaduct was built between the two for the Tyne and Wear Metro in the 1970s. The viaduct is a Grade II* listed building, a status which grants it legal protection.

== See also ==
- Grade II* listed buildings in Tyne and Wear
