= Ouseburn =

River in Newcastle upon Tyne, England

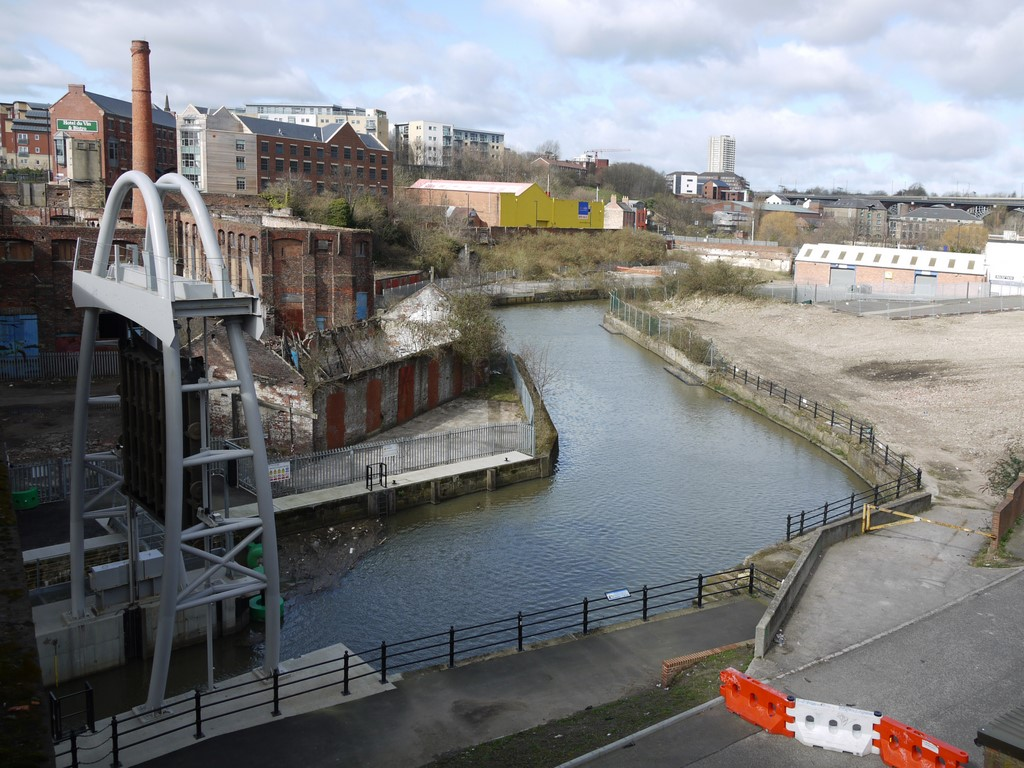
- Ouseburn and Barrage

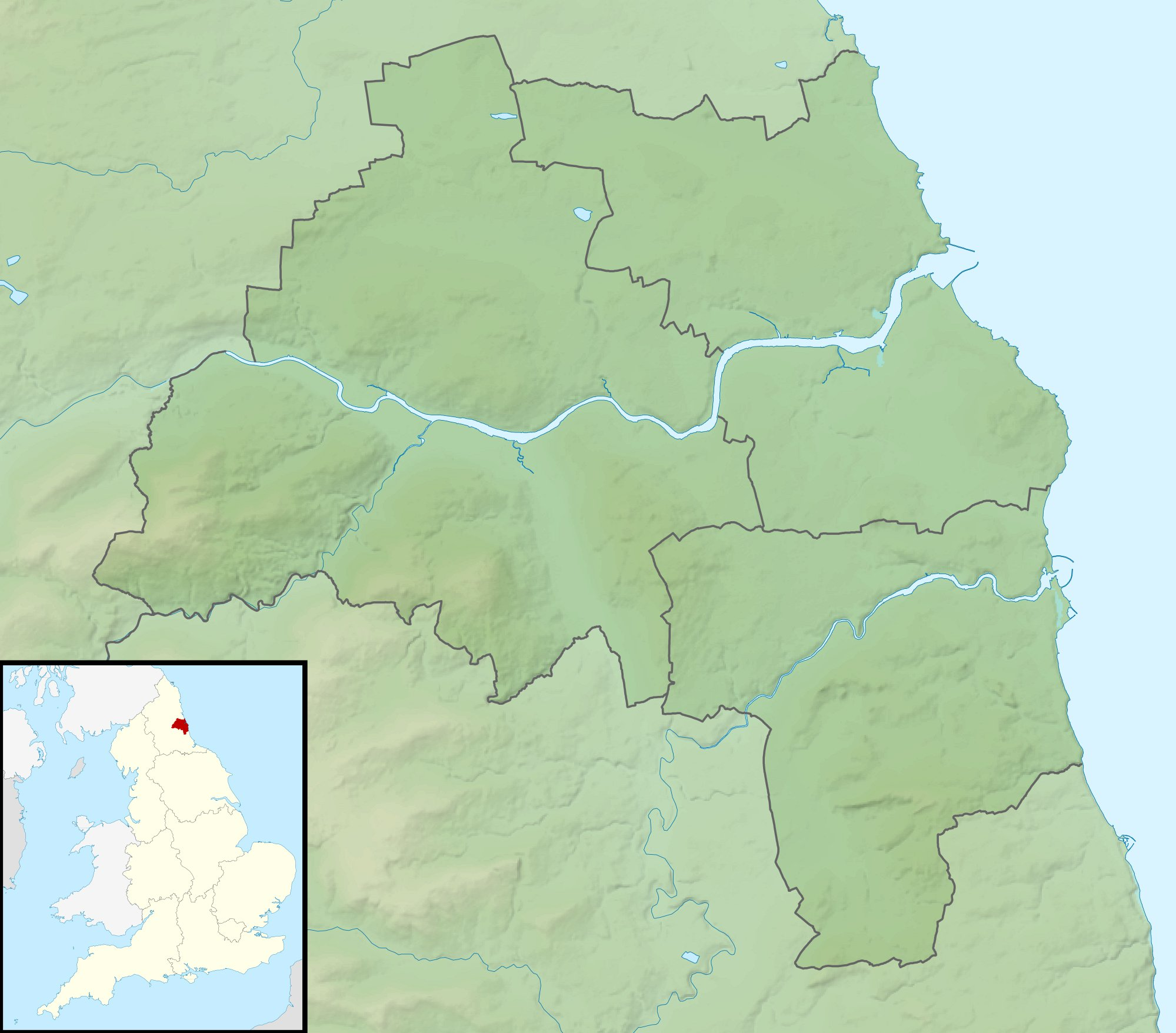
- Location of mouth within Newcastle, shown on map of Tyne & Wear

Location
- Country: United Kingdom
- County: Tyne and Wear; Northumberland (historical)

Physical characteristics
- Mouth
  - location: River Tyne
  - coordinates: 54.9708°N 1.5883°W

The Ouseburn is a small river in Newcastle upon Tyne, England, that flows through the city into the River Tyne. It gives its name to the Ouseburn Valley and the Ouseburn electoral ward for Newcastle City Council elections.

The Ouseburn has its source at Callerton in the north of the city near Newcastle Airport. It then flows through the Kingston Park area of the city, Newcastle Great Park, Gosforth Park and Whitebridge Park. The Ouseburn then continues from South Gosforth into Jesmond Dene, then through Armstrong Park and Heaton Park, where it marks the boundary between Heaton and Sandyford. The river then flows through a culvert before emerging under Ouseburn railway viaduct, whence it flows past the City Farm, Seven Stories and the Toffee Factory and meets the River Tyne.

The river was previously tidal from the Viaduct, revealing dark mud at low tide. However since 2009 a tidal barrage at the river mouth retains high water in the Ouseburn at low tide, with the objective of providing a more pleasant environment alongside its banks at low tide, thus promoting development. Despite the expense of its construction the Ouseburn barrage has had operational problems and was left open for a length of time while they were corrected.

The lower Ouseburn Valley, whilst heavily industrialised in the past, serves as of 2013 as a hub for the arts and creative industries and has a lively pub scene, noted for live music and real ale.

In Roman times the lower Ouseburn Valley was crossed by Hadrian's Wall but there are now no traces to be seen. On the eastern side of the valley, at the eastern end of a new block of flats, there is an information board with an artist's impression of the Wall crossing the valley. This section of the Wall was the later extension from the Roman fort of Pons Aelius (Newcastle) to that of Segedunum (Wallsend). This newer section of the Wall was not backed by the Vallum because the River Tyne rendered it superfluous.

== See also ==
- Ouseburn Valley
- List of rivers of England
