= Whittingham, Northumberland =

Village in Northumberland, England

Coordinates: 55.397°N 1.899°W

Whittingham
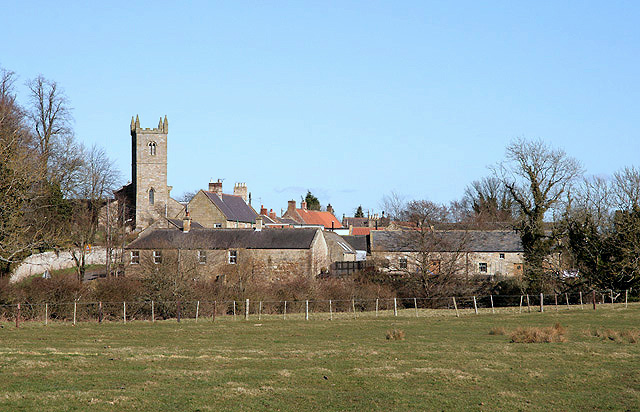
- Whittingham village

- Location within Northumberland
- Population: 525 (2011 census. including Alnham)
- OS grid reference: NU065115
- Unitary authority: Northumberland
- Ceremonial county: Northumberland
- Region: North East
- Country: England
- Sovereign state: United Kingdom
- Post town: ALNWICK
- Postcode district: NE66
- Dialling code: 01665
- Police: Northumbria
- Fire: Northumberland
- Ambulance: North East
- UK Parliament: North Northumberland

River Aln
Settlements

- Alnham
- Alnmouth
- Alnwick
- Lesbury
- Whittingham

Whittingham is a village and civil parish in Northumberland, England. It is situated on the banks of the River Aln, around 4.5 miles (7 km) east of its source at Alnham and 7.3 miles (12 km) west of Alnwick. The thirteenth/fourteenth century pele tower, Whittingham Tower, was converted into almshouses in 1845 and is now in private ownership.

== History ==
The village name is thought to derive from Anglo-Saxon times, meaning 'the meeting place of Hwita's people'. The double ford at the west of the village has led some historians to suggest this is the location of 'Twyford' mentioned in the writings of the Venerable Bede.

In 1847 a hoard (including swords and spears) was found at Thurnton Farm near Whittingham

There were two pele towers in the village. One to the west of the village near the church was used by the clergy. It was listed in a survey in 1541. It was either incorporated into the vicarage or dismantled when the current vicarage was built.

The second pele tower was destroyed during the rebellion of Gilbert de Middleton in 1371. By 1415, it had been replaced and was owned by WillIam Heron; in 1541, it was owned by Robert Collingwood. The tower was restored and modernised in 1845 to serve as an almshouse for the poor of the Ravensworth's estate.

== Governance ==
Whittingham was in the parliamentary constituency of Berwick-upon-Tweed until 2024, when it became part of the reformed constituency of North Northumberland.

It is in the Rothbury division of Northumberland County Council.

== Geography ==
The village lies in the valley of the River Aln, characterised by gentle rolling hills and fertile soils; this area is frequently referred to as the Vale of Whittingham.

At the western end of the village, the River Aln meets Callaly Burn; there is a double ford at the confluence with two footbridges alongside.

There are road bridges over the river at either end of the village and a footbridge in the centre.

== Demography ==
In 1848, the village had 681 residents, with a total of 1896 in the village and surrounding parish. In the 2011 census, the population was 525, including the surrounding parish.

== Economy ==
The village no longer has shops or a pub. Nearby Glanton has a post office and a pub.

== Landmarks ==
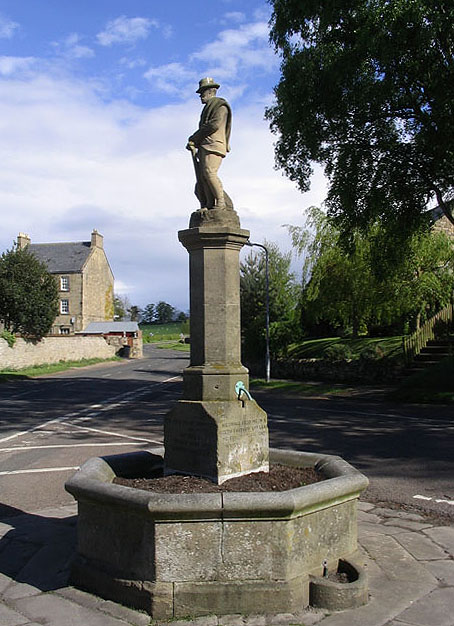
The fountain memorial to Athole, 3rd Earl of Ravensworth

Two Roman roads passed close to the village; to the east is the Devil's Causeway and south of the village is the road from High Rochester; these met at Learchild Fort, about 2 km east of the village.

Eslington Park, on the western side of Whittingham, is a Grade II* listed country house, dating from the 18th century; it was built for the Liddell family (later Earls of Ravensworth), who funded several amenities in the village.

A fortified tower house in the village was used during the border wars with Scotland. It was restored by Lady Ravensworth in 1845 to be used as almshouses.

The village hall was built in 1925, as the Whittingham Memorial Institute, to commemorate those who died in the Great War.

On the green is a village pump, constructed by Lord Ravensworth in 1865. The former police station, overlooking the green, dates from 1859; it is now used as an outdoor expedition centre.

== Transport ==
Whittingham lies just west of the main A697 road, which connects Morpeth on the A1 to the A68 at Oxton, near Edinburgh. The road runs via Wooler and Coldstream, passing through a largely rural area of the Scottish Borders.

The village is served by two bus routes:

- X16 between Kelso, Wooler and Newcastle, operated by Arriva Northumbria
- 473 between Wooler and Alnwick, operated by Glen Valley Tours.

The former Whittingham railway station is on the east side of the main road. It was built in 1887, as a stop on the North Eastern Railway's Cornhill Branch, which connected Alnwick with Coldstream. It was closed in 1953 and has since been restored by a private owner.

== Education ==
The village has a primary school, Whittingham Church of England First School; in 2019, it had around 100 pupils.

== Religious sites ==
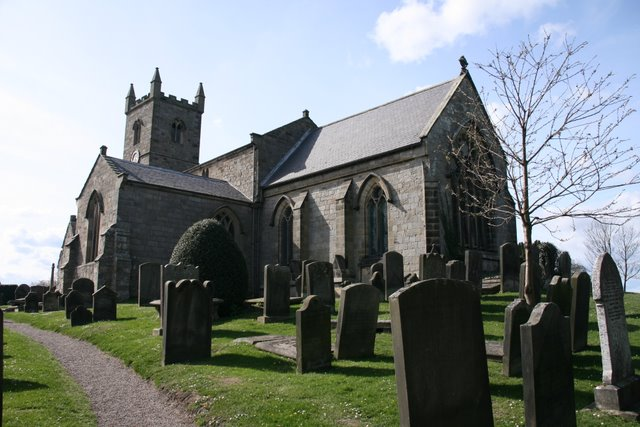
St Bartholomew's church

The parish church is dedicated to St Bartholomew, shown in a stained-glass window. There is Anglo-Saxon stonework in the tower that dates from around 900 AD, but a church was recorded here in 735. The tower arch is plain and massive; the medieval work has been subject to much later alteration. The 19th-century redecoration includes plain lead-glazing in the windows.

There are several gravestones in the churchyard that have skulls incised on them; these are known as Memento Mori stones and are listed monuments.

Halfway between the village and Glanton, situated in a small copse, is St. Mary's Roman Catholic church. The church was built 1877-1881 when the chapel at Callaly Castle was deconsecrated after the Catholic Clavering family sold the castle. The church is built in the Romanesque style. There is also an attached presbytery.

== Sources ==
- Grundy, John (2022). History of Northumberland. Newcastle upon Tyne: Tyne Bridge Publishing. ISBN 9781838280970.
