= Akeld railway station =

Disused railway station in Northumberland, England

Akeld
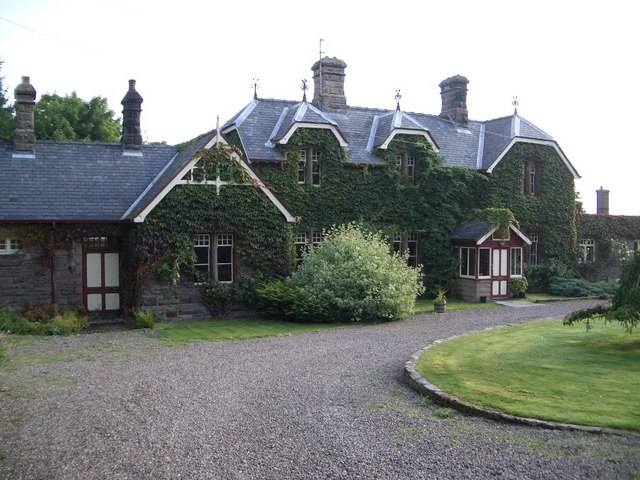

General information
- Location: Akeld, Wooler, Northumberland; England
- Coordinates: 55.5634°N 2.0702°W
- Grid reference: NT956300
- Platforms: 1

Other information
- Status: Disused

History
- Original company: North Eastern Railway
- Post-grouping: London and North Eastern Railway, North Eastern Region of British Railways

Key dates
- 5 September 1887: Station opens
- 22 September 1930: Closed to passengers
- 29 March 1965: Goods services withdrawn
Location

Akeld was a stone-built railway station that served the hamlet of Akeld, in Northumberland, England. It was a stop on the Cornhill Branch, which ran from Alnwick to Cornhill Junction on the Kelso line near Coldstream.

== History ==
Authorised in 1882, the Cornhill Branch was built to link the farming communities of north Northumberland with the market town of Alnwick and link the North Eastern Railway's Kelso line to its Alnwick branch. Construction started by the North Eastern Railway in 1884 and the line opened to freight between Cornhill and Wooperton on 2 May 1887; the whole line for both freight and passengers opened on 5 September of the same year.

The line had difficulty attracting passengers, as many of the stations were some distance from the communities they served. Increased bus competition in the 1920s led to passenger trains being withdrawn on 22 September 1930 although the service resumed briefly during the Second World War to serve RAF Milfield near Akeld.

After a severe storm in August 1948 washed away a bridge north of Ilderton station, British Railways, which had recently taken over the line, decided that the volume of traffic along the line did not warrant replacing it. The line was thus split into two: Alnwick to Ilderton and Coldstream to Wooler, which included Akeld. This, coupled with an infrequent service, caused the line to go further into decline and the section from Alnwick to Ilderton closed on 2 March 1953; the other section and Akeld station followed suit on 29 March 1965.

== Services ==
Preceding station	Disused railways	Following station
Kirknewton	North Eastern Railway; Cornhill branch line	Wooler

== The site today ==
The station building is substantially intact and has undergone restoration as a let to holidaymakers.
