= Whittingham railway station (Northumberland) =

Disused railway station in Northumberland, England

Whittingham
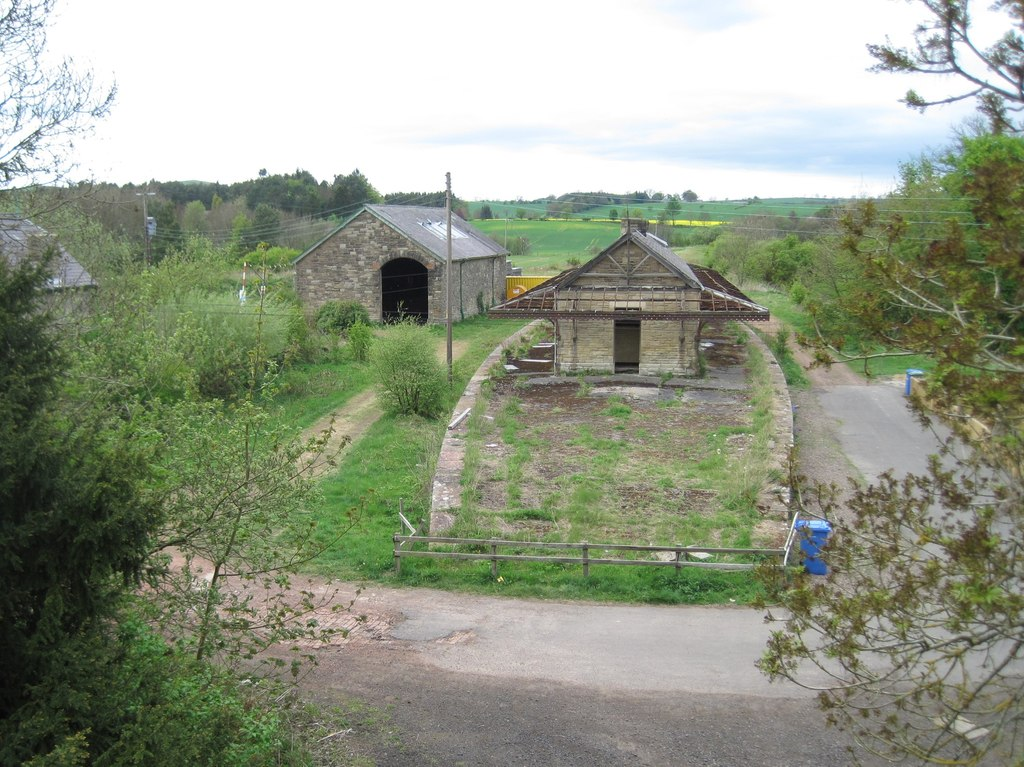
- The remnants of the station in 2010

General information
- Location: Whittingham, Northumberland; England
- Coordinates: 55.4028°N 1.8614°W
- Grid reference: NU088121
- Platforms: 2

Other information
- Status: Disused

History
- Original company: North Eastern Railway
- Post-grouping: LNER

Key dates
- 5 September 1887: Opened
- 22 September 1930: Closed to passengers
- 2 March 1953: Closed completely
Location

Whittingham railway station served the village of Whittingham, in Northumberland, England from 1887 to 1953. It was a stop on the Cornhill Branch, which connected Coldstream with Alnwick.

== History ==
The station was opened on 5 September 1887 by the North Eastern Railway. It was situated on the north side of an unnamed road and immediately west of the junction at the A697. The station had five sidings on the west side, one serving a goods shed, three serving a goods platform and the last one serving a coal drop and a weighbridge.

The station closed to passengers on 22 September 1930 and to goods traffic on 2 March 1953.

The station site was host to a LNER camping coach from 1935 to 1939 and may have had a coach visiting in 1934 and 1935; this was despite the lack of a passenger service. Camping coach residents were transported to and from the coach in a passenger carriage attached to parcels trains.

Preceding station	Disused railways	Following station
Glanton; Line and station closed	North Eastern Railway; Cornhill Branch	Edlingham; Line and station closed

== The site today ==
In 2009, the station was bought by a private individual to transform it into a residence. The work of restoration was documented in the episode "Victorian Railway Station" of the television series The Restoration Man.

In 2016, the restoration work was reported as ongoing.
