= Glanton railway station =

Disused railway station in Northumberland, England

Glanton
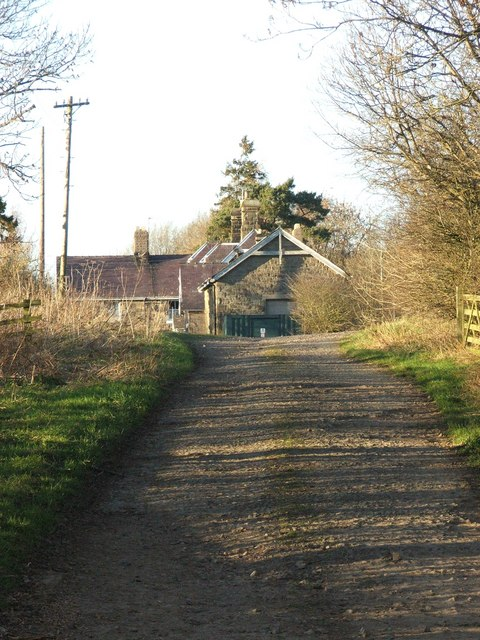
- The site of the station in 2007

General information
- Location: Glanton, Northumberland; England
- Coordinates: 55.4262°N 1.8724°W
- Grid reference: NU081147
- Platforms: 1

Other information
- Status: Disused

History
- Original company: North Eastern Railway
- Post-grouping: London and North Eastern Railway

Key dates
- 5 September 1887: Opened
- 22 September 1930: Closed to passengers
- 2 March 1953: Closed completely
Location

Glanton railway station served the village of Glanton, in Northumberland, England from 1887 to 1953. It was a stop on the Cornhill Branch, which connected Alnwick with Coldstream.

== History ==
The station opened on 5 September 1887 by the North Eastern Railway. It was situated at the end of an approach road, which was on the north side of an unnamed road. After closing to passengers on 22 September 1930, it was downgraded to a public delivery siding on 1 May 1950, before closing to goods on 2 March 1953.

| Preceding station | Disused railways | Following station |
|---|---|---|
| Hedgeley; Line and station closed | North Eastern Railway; Cornhill Branch | Whittingham; Line and station closed |

== The site today ==
The goods shed and three cottages remain near the site of the station.
