= Powburn =

Village in Northumberland, England

Coordinates: 55.443°N 1.896°W

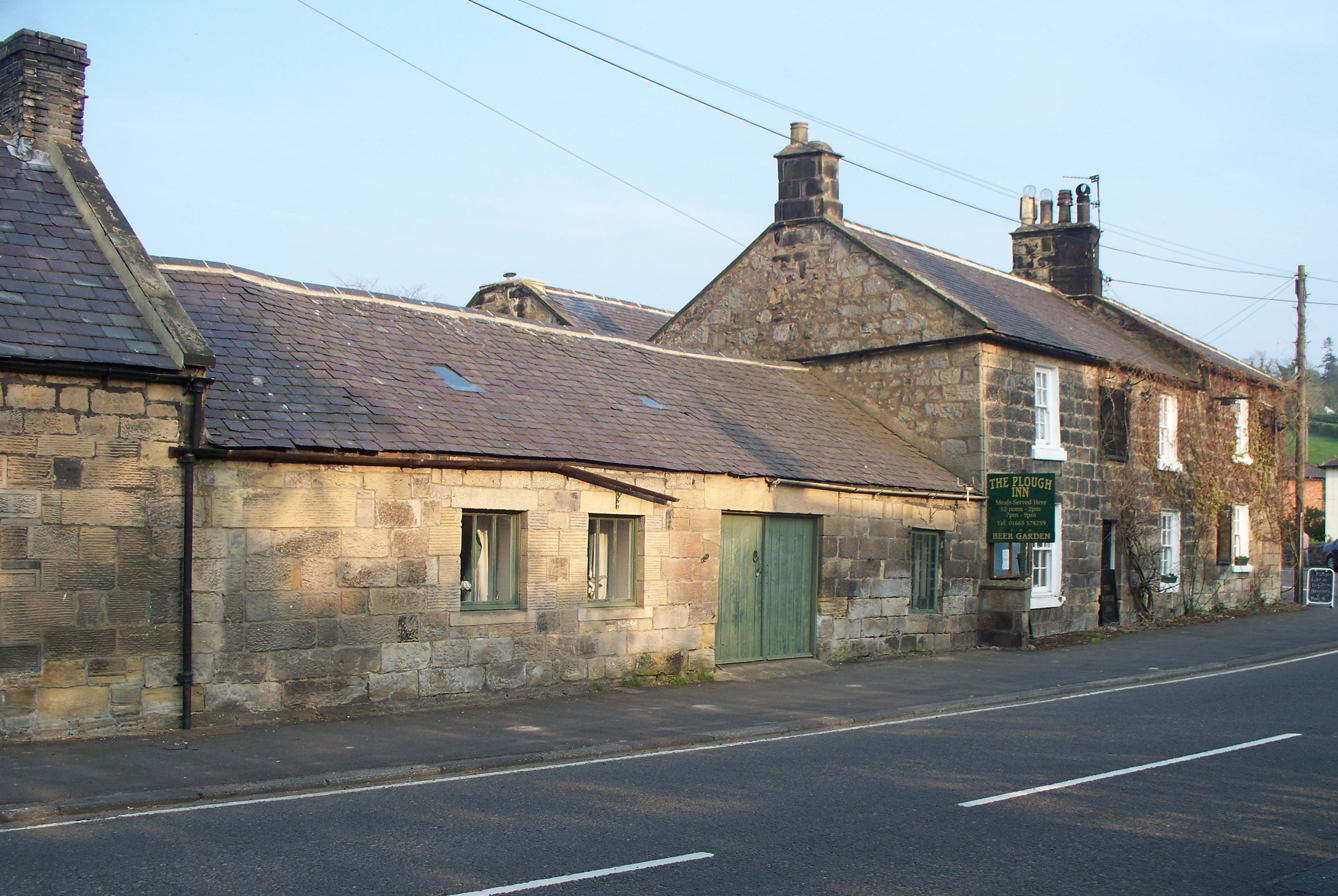
- Powburn

- Location within Northumberland
- OS grid reference: NU065165
- Shire county: Northumberland
- Region: North East
- Country: England
- Sovereign state: United Kingdom
- Post town: Alnwick
- Postcode district: NE66
- Dialling code: 01665
- Police: Northumbria
- Fire: Northumberland
- Ambulance: North East
- UK Parliament: North Northumberland

Powburn is a small village on the A697 in Northumberland, England about 8 miles (13 km) south of Wooler and 10 miles (16 km) northwest of Alnwick.

== Landmarks ==
The Devil's Causeway passes through the village and continues north under the A697 road crossing the River Till. The causeway is a Roman road which starts at Portgate on Hadrian's Wall, north of Corbridge, and extends 55 miles (89 km) northwards across Northumberland to the mouth of the River Tweed at Berwick-upon-Tweed.

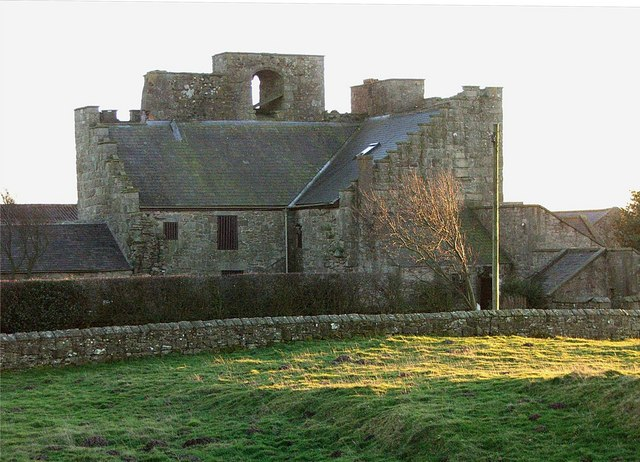
Crawley Tower

By the roadside a stiff half-mile eastwards from Powburn is Crawley Tower, a fine medieval Border pele. The fortification is a strong one (its defensive ditch is still imposing) and probably guarded the crossing, near the former Hedgeley railway station, of the Breamish by the Devil's Causeway.
