= Edlingham railway station =

Disused railway station in Northumberland, England

Edlingham
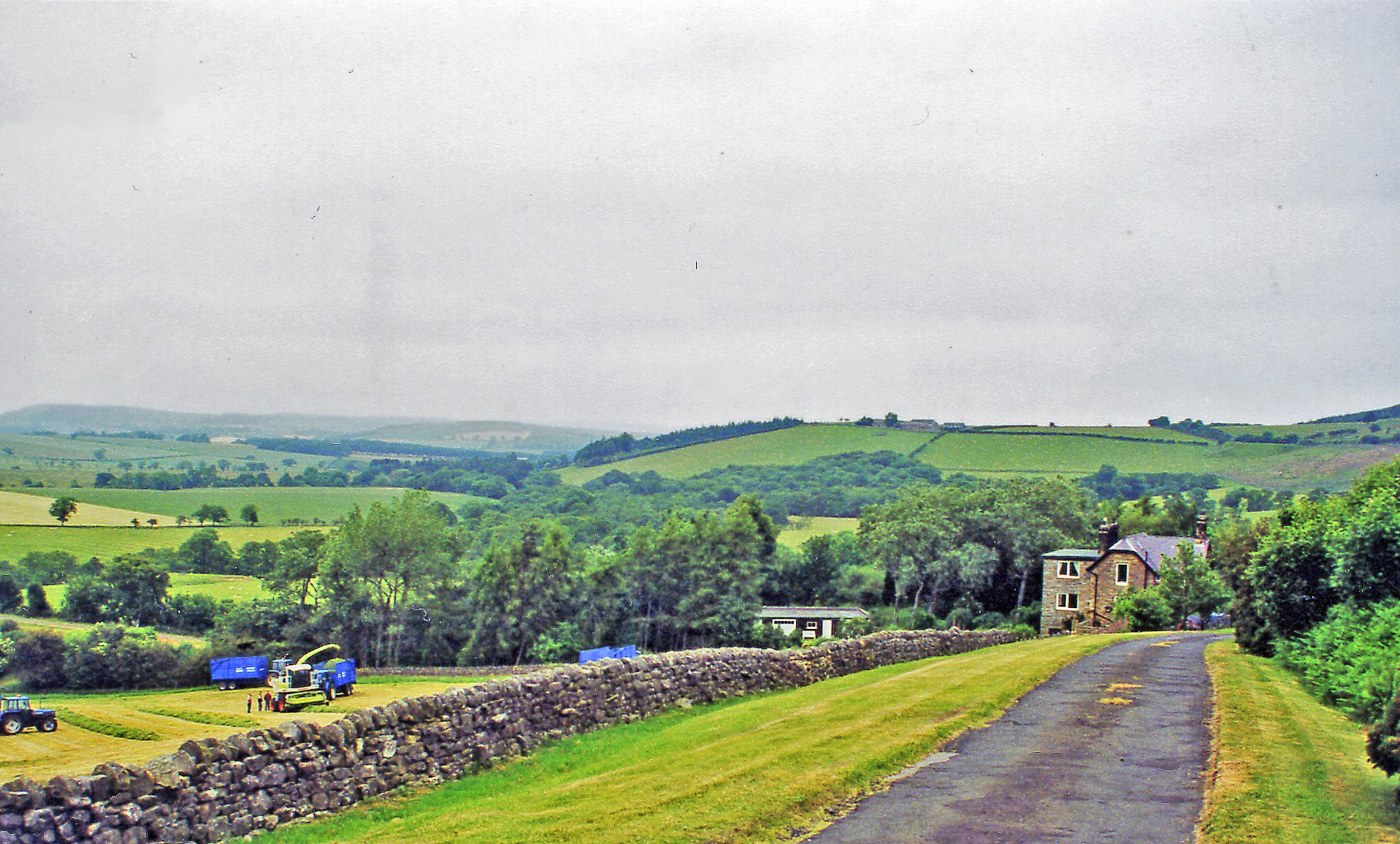
- The site of the station in 2000

General information
- Location: Edlingham, Northumberland; England
- Coordinates: 55.377°N 1.8105°W
- Grid reference: NU121092
- Platforms: 1

Other information
- Status: Disused

History
- Original company: North Eastern Railway
- Post-grouping: London and North Eastern Railway

Key dates
- 5 September 1887: Opened
- 22 September 1930: Closed to passengers
- 2 March 1953: Closed to goods
Location

Edlingham railway station served the village of Edlingham, in Northumberland, England from 1887 to 1953. It was a stop on the Cornhill Branch, which connected Coldstream with Alnwick.

== History ==
The station was opened on 5 September 1887 by the North Eastern Railway. It was situated at the end of an approach road that runs north from the B6341. To the west of the station was a goods yard, which had two sidings: one serving a cattle dock and the other serving a small goods shed. The goods traffic at the station was never large; only six wagons of livestock were loaded in 1913.

The station was downgraded to an unstaffed halt on 23 August 1926 and closed to passengers on 22 September 1930. The name was changed to Edlingham Siding on 14 February 1938.

The station was closed completely on 2 March 1953.

Preceding station	Disused railways	Following station
Whittingham; Line and station closed	Cornhill Branch	Alnwick; Line and station closed

== The site today ==
The platforms, station building and signal box are extant; they are still in good condition. The station building is now a private residence.
