= Akeld =

Village in Northumberland, England

Coordinates: 55.559°N 2.073°W

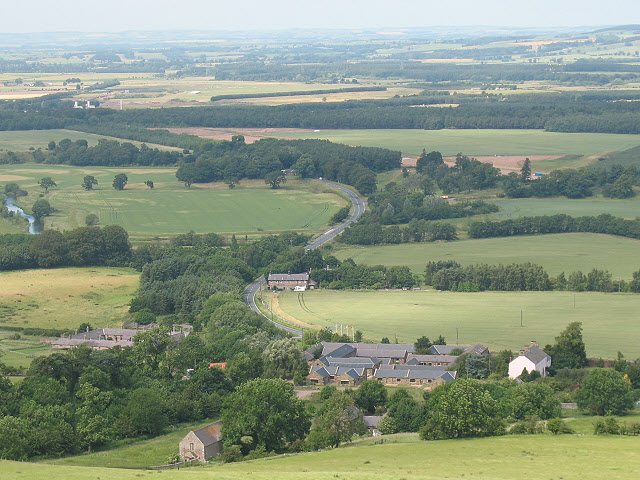
- View over Akeld from the south

- Location within Northumberland
- Population: 221 (2011 census (including Kirknewton))
- OS grid reference: NT955295
- Unitary authority: Northumberland
- Ceremonial county: Northumberland
- Region: North East
- Country: England
- Sovereign state: United Kingdom
- Post town: WOOLER
- Postcode district: NE71
- Dialling code: 01668
- Police: Northumbria
- Fire: Northumberland
- Ambulance: North East
- UK Parliament: Berwick-upon-Tweed

Akeld is a village and civil parish in Northumberland, England. It is situated around 2.7 miles (4.3 km) to the west of Wooler and 9.3 miles (15.0 km) from the border with Scotland at Coldstream. The village lies on the northern limit of Northumberland National Park and on the foot of the Cheviot Hills massif. It is overlooked by Akeld Hill and Harehope Hill to the south. In 2001 Akeld had a population of 82, increasing at the 2011 Census to 221, although this was partly due to the parish merging with that of Kirknewton. The burn which runs through the village and down to the Milfield Basin also bears the name Akeld.

The economy of Akeld has historically been focussed on agriculture. The position of the village between the English and Scottish borders has meant it often suffered at the hand of border raids. In the 19th century, Akeld was served by a railway station which made the village less isolated. The closure of the railway in the 20th century, combined with declining agricultural employment, has led to a reduction in the village's size and population.

== Toponymy ==
The name "Akeld" may derive from the Old West Scandinavian kelda, meaning well or spring. There is not much evidence for Scandinavian settlement in Northumberland, so Akeld would represent one of only a few examples of place-names in this area with Scandinavian origin. Alternatively, the name may derive from the Old English achelda (ā + helde) meaning "oak-tree slope". The spelling of Akeld has changed over time, being recorded as Achelda (1169), Hakedla (1176), Akekeld (1246), Akil (1255), Ak(h)ille (1320), Akyld (1428), Akell (1694), and Yakeld (1733).

== History ==
=== Origins of the settlement ===
The earliest evidence of human occupation in Akeld dates back to the Mesolithic period in the form of a microlith – a small flint tool – discovered in the north of the parish. The slopes of the Cheviots to the south of Akeld would have been wooded during the Mesolithic period, so would have likely been used by hunting or foraging parties. A Neolithic henge was discovered on flat land to the north of the River Glen and is probably part of a larger collection of monuments found in the Milfield Basin. The Milfield Basin was likely at least semi-permanently settled by the end of the Neolithic era. The purpose of the monuments within is unclear, but they may have been religious in nature.

Evidence of Bronze Age and Iron Age habitation can be found in the Cheviot uplands to the south of the village, where there are many upstanding monuments constructed from local rocks. A prehistoric settlement, typical of the north Cheviots area, has been discovered at Houseledge East to the south of the village. The surviving remains consist of three early houses marked by circles of stone. A similar Early Bronze Age site was discovered at Houseledge West, consisting of over 12 house circles. Artefacts were also found at the site, which included Early Bronze Age pottery and a flint knife. Burial sites, including a cairn in Black Law and a site near to Battle Stone, have been discovered in the area. Iron Age hillforts close to Akeld include those on Humbleton Hill and Monday Cleugh, to the south of the village centre. A promontory fort at Glead's Cleugh, to the south-west of the village centre, was likely to have been in existence by the mid-first millennium BC. It stands in a defensive position overlooking Akeld Burn and is protected by double ramparts. The remains of stone huts at both Harehope Hill and Glead's Cleugh may indicate human habitation, but it is also possible that such buildings may have been used as animal enclosures, market places, trading stations, or community focal points.

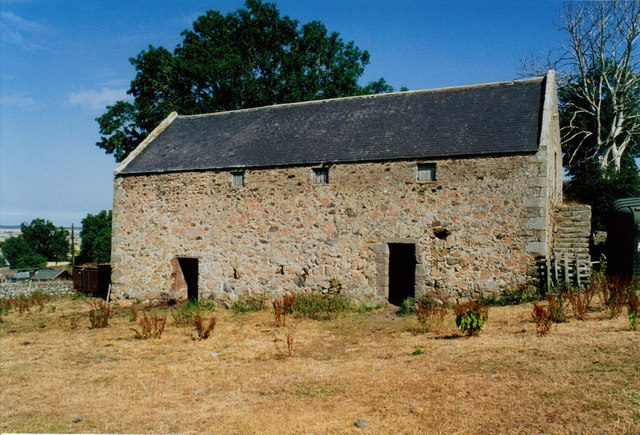
Akeld Bastle, built in the early 16th century.

Not much is known about the early medieval history of Akeld. However, 2 miles west of Akeld in Yeavering is the renowned site of Ad Grefin, the Anglican palace complex. This was described in Bede's Ecclesiastical History of the English People as the centre of Bishop Paulinus of Antioch's mission to Bernicia. The complex was a major royal centre in both Bernicia and later Northumbria. During the early medieval period, the parish of Akeld included the now deserted villages of Ewart and Humbleton. Akeld went through a troubled period during the later medieval and Tudor periods. Glendale was particularly exposed to raids from the clans of Teviotdale, and it was also an invasion route for larger Scottish forces. A bastle – a fortified farmhouse common on the Anglo-Scottish border – was built in 1522 in Akeld which held a garrison of 10 men. Two significant battles occurred near Akeld in the 15th century: the Battle of Homildon Hill in 1420 and the Battle of Geteryne in 1415. In 1580, Akeld was wasted by the Scots, but 16 tenants still remained in the village.

=== Land-ownership history ===
Akeld was one of the constituent manors of the Barony of Wooler. In the 13th century, the township of Akeld was held by Robert Muschamp, Baron of Wooler. It was subinfeudated to William of Akeld, and after Muschamp's death in 1250 his estate was divided to his granddaughters – the daughters of the Earl of Strathearn. By 1443, the township was no longer held in chivalry but by the manor of Wooler by socage. By 1480, the manor had been acquired by the Greys of Chillingham. Ownership of three quarters of the manor under the Greys continued into the 16th and 17th centuries. The township was recorded in 1541 as "of th'inherytaunce of ... Mr Graye of Chyllyngham." In 1663, Lord Grey was recorded as the only landowner in Akeld township. In 1733, three quarters of the manor of Akeld was offered for sale and was bought by Samuel Kettilby of Berwick for £4,200. It was sold again by his son in 1767 to George Sparrow, whose grandson sold the property to Matthew Culley, lord of Denton. The descendants of Culley held the property into the 20th century.

The other quarter of Akeld manor had a separate history. The first holder was probably Thomas Haggerston, first mentioned in 1291. By the mid-15th century, the property was held by Robert Houpyn. It is likely that the Wallis family held the property during the 16th and 17th centuries. In 1713, Ralph Wallis of Knarsdale sold his property in the township for £1,250 to the Ogle family of Newcastle upon Tyne. The fields of the property had not been enclosed which caused trouble involving trespassing and diminished crops. Sir Chaloner Ogle and Samuel Kettilby (owner of the other three quarters of the manor) came to an agreement to resolve these issues. In 1830, the whole of the manor came into the hands of Matthew Culley.

=== Religious history ===
There appears to have been a chapel in Akeld by the first half of the 13th century. Robert of Akeld has responsible for keeping the chapel in repair and providing all necessary books and vestments in return for 10 shillings provided by the canons of Kirkham. By 1389, the chapel has fallen into disuse. The site of the chapel cannot be exactly located, but in 1737, Mr. Kettilby – the owner of three quarters of the manor – wrote a letter which referred to "about 54 acres of land called churchland" situated with the other quarter of the manor. In 1828, Archdeacon Singleton wrote about an old graveyard and noted that "there is a tradition of a parochial chapelyard at Akeld, but it seems now to be alienated, and I was told the high road to Wooler passed through it." The chapel may have been dedicated to the Virgin Mary due to the proximity of the 'Lady's Close' and 'Lady's Well'. Furthermore, during the ownership of Robert of Akeld, the canons of Kirkham obliged him and his heirs to attend the church on all the festivals of Our Lady. The location of the chapel is estimated to be roughly where the modern Akeld-Kirknewton road lies. Today, the nearest churches to Akeld are the Church of St Gregory the Great in Kirknewton, Milfield Methodist Church, and St Ninian's Catholic Church, the Evangelical Church, United Reform Church, and Cheviot Benefice churches in Wooler.

=== Economic history ===
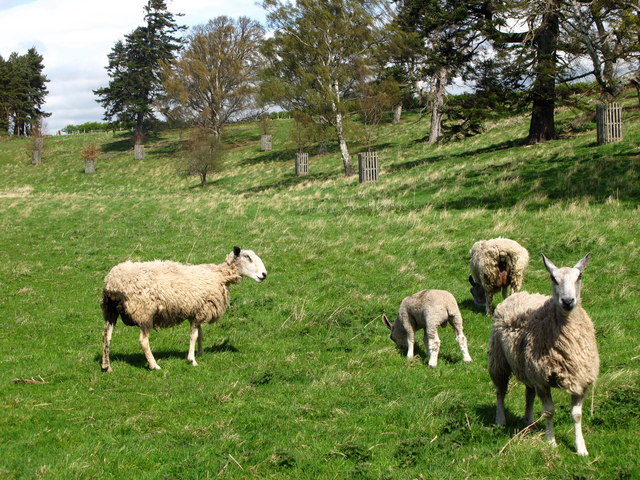
Sheep in a field to the north of Akeld. Agriculture has been the main industry of Akeld for most of its history.

The economy of Akeld has largely been focussed on agriculture throughout its history. The post-Medieval period saw a growth in agriculture in the area. Stone farmhouses, including Akeld Steads Farmhouse, were constructed at this time. In the 18th-19th centuries, Matthew and George Culley are well known for having improved Northumbrian agricultural practices. In Akeld, this likely led to the increase in yield of turnips, recorded in 1910. There is also evidence of watermills in the village from the 18th and 19th centuries. The population of Akeld township grew in the first half of the 19th century, from 153 in 1801 to 186 in 1851. One reason for the increase in population may have been due to the female workers, or bondagers, who were employed to work in the agricultural estates of Scotland and north Northumberland. The population of Akeld declined in the second half of the 19th century down to only 136 residents in 1901. This reduction may be due to a prolonged agricultural depression in the late 19th century and the cessation of the Bondage System.

Throughout the 20th century, fewer people became employed in agricultural practices due to increased mechanisation and the decline in farming incomes. The size of individual farm tenancies increased, which led to many farm complexes becoming redundant. Akeld itself was made a redundant as a farming complex. Domestic service industries, which also employed many people in north Northumberland in the early 20th century, declined by the second half of the century. The closure of the railway line through Glendale also had a negative impact on the population of the area. Akled diminished in size as a village, and by the 21st century it was largely populated by retirees and commuters.

== Demography ==
At the time of the 2011 UK Census, Akeld Parish had 221 usual residents. 15.4% of residents were aged 0–19, and 28.6% were aged 65+. 99.5% of residents identified as white. The majority of residents (67.9%) were Christian, with the remaining population having either "no religion" or no religion stated. 60% of residents were economically active with agriculture, forestry and fishing being the most common industry.

== Governance ==
Throughout its history, Akeld has been incorporated into various territorial units. In the 19th century, the township of Akeld was one of 15 townships incorporated in the parish of Kirknewton. At 38,000 acres (150 km^{2}), Kirknewtown covered the majority of the north Cheviots. Today, Akeld is a civil parish which comprises the former township of Humbledon and part of the Northumberland National Park.

Akeld is in the parliamentary constituency of Berwick-upon-Tweed with Anne-Marie Trevelyan (Conservative) as local MP. In the 2019 UK election, the seat was won with a majority of 14,835 votes. Prior to the 2015 UK General election, the seat was held by Alan Beith (Liberal Democrats). In local government, Akeld is in the Wooler Ward and represented by Northumberland County Councillor Mark George Mather (Conservative).

== Landmarks ==
Akeld consists of two main settlements – one centred on Akeld Manor in the village centre, and another near the former train station at Low Akeld to the north. Akeld and the surrounding area contain a number of listed structures and monuments.

=== Akeld Manor ===
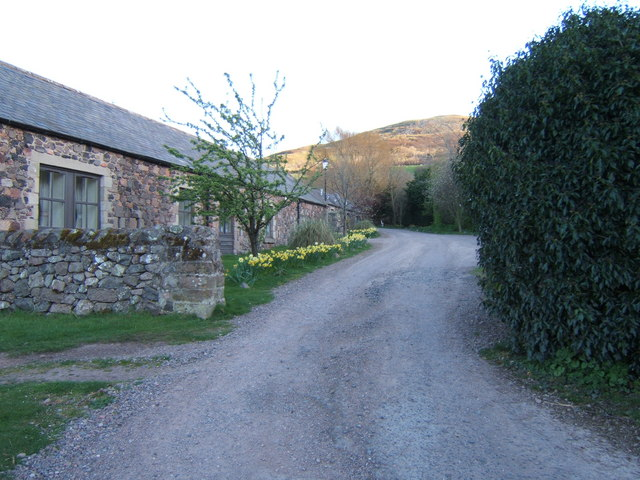
Exterior of Akeld Manor.

Akeld Manor is a Grade II listed 18th or early 19th century six-bay farmhouse located in the village centre. It is rendered with ashlar dressings and has a roof made of Scottish slate. Attached to the north of the Manor is a cottage, carriage house and gateway which are all also Grade II listed. The cottage was built in the late 18th century. Like the Manor, it also has ashlar dressings, but has a Lakeland slate roof. The carriage house is attached to the cottage on the left and the gateway is attached on the right. 30 yards (27 m) to the west of Akeld Manor are a range of farmbuildings. Two of these date from the late 18th and early 19th centuries. There is also an older section of cottages and four stables.

=== Akeld Bastle ===
Akeld Bastle is a Grade II listed building located to the south of Akeld Manor. It was built in the early 16th century. The earliest written reference to the bastle is from 1522 when Lord Dacre proposed to station 10 men there for the defence of the Anglo-Scottish border. Dacre used the term "tower" to describe the building, but Bowes and Ellerker described it in their 1541 survey as "a lytle fortelett or bastle house without a barmekyn". The bastle was most likely in possession of the Wallis family throughout the 16th and 17th centuries as part of their portion of the manor. The structure was in a state of decay by the late 18th century, and the first floor was probably rebuilt in the early 19th century. The design of the bastle is not a common for those built in the county but is similar to a small group near the River Tweed. It is longer than most bastles at around 63 feet (19 m). Akeld Bastle is now used as an animal shelter.

=== Railway station ===
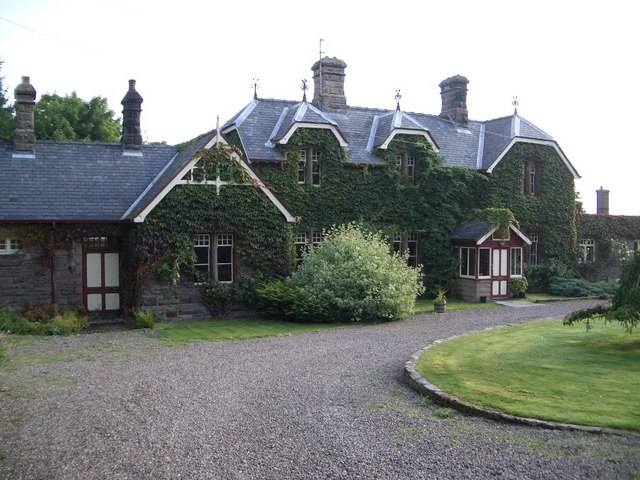
The former railway station in Akeld.

The railway station in Akeld was designed by William Bell. The station was one of his line-style stations on the former Alnwick–Cornhill railway which opened in 1887. The constituent buildings consist of station offices, a goods shed, a weigh cabin house, and cottages. All are built out of red sandstone. All of the buildings on the line are renowned for their quality. The reason for such grand architecture for buildings on a relatively quiet railway line is possibly due to North Eastern Railway wanting to secure territory from their rival, North British Railway. The buildings were built to the same basic design with variations in size. Akeld station was one of the largest stations on the line, with only Wooler station being bigger. The Alnwick–Cornhill line continued in use until the slump in post-World War I passenger services, which in turn led to the closure of Akeld station in 1930. Akeld became an active train station again during World War II when it was used on the line towards a new Royal Air Force base in Millfield. Serious storm damage to the line between 1948 and 1949 led to the closure of the line again. The station subsequently became a holiday destination until the 1960s with carriages and waiting rooms rented out as self-catering accommodation. Akeld station has now been converted into a residential property.

== Transport ==
The centre of Akeld village is located on the junction between the A697, which runs from Morpeth to Scotland, and the B6351, running east–west from Akeld to Kilham. A further road leads south-west from the village centre following the path of Akeld Burn. The village is served by the bus operators Glen Valley Tours and Borders Buses. There are two opposite bus stops in the village centre. The nearest train station is Berwick-upon-Tweed railway, around 18 miles (29 km) away. From 1887 to 1930 the village was served by Akeld railway station on the North Eastern Railway branch line, designed to serve north and central Northumberland. During this time the village became less isolated.
