= Horton, Chatton =

Coordinates: 55.572°N 1.957°W

Horton
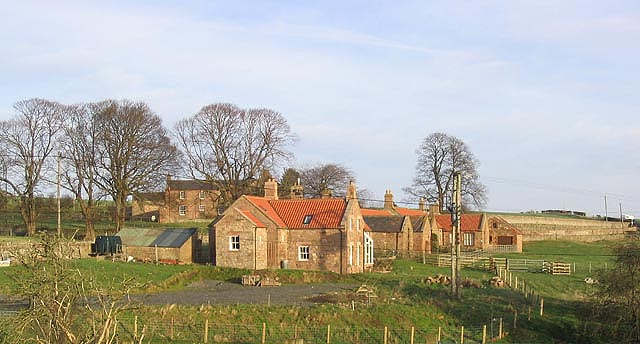
- East Horton

- Location within Northumberland
- OS grid reference: NU028309
- Civil parish: Chatton
- Unitary authority: Northumberland
- Shire county: Northumberland
- Region: North East
- Country: England
- Sovereign state: United Kingdom
- Post town: WOOLER
- Postcode district: NE71
- Police: Northumbria
- Fire: Northumberland
- Ambulance: North East
- UK Parliament: North Northumberland

Horton is a pair of small settlements, West Horton and East Horton, divided by a stream - the Horton Burn - in Northumberland, England 3 miles (5 km) north east of Wooler and 5 miles (8 km) west of Belford. Horton Moor is north of the settlements.

It is first attested as Horton' (Turbervill) ('Horton held by the Turbervill family') in 1242. The place-name Horton is a common one in England. It derives from Old English horu 'dirt' and tūn 'settlement, farm, estate', presumably meaning 'farm on muddy soil'.

== Landmarks ==
The Devil's Causeway passes through the village and continues north under a C Road for about 6 miles (10 km) to Lowick. The causeway was a Roman road which started at the Portgate on Hadrian's Wall, north of Corbridge, and extended 55 miles (89 km) northwards across Northumberland to the mouth of the River Tweed at Berwick-upon-Tweed.

Two miles to the north of the village is Hetton Hall, which comprises a 15th-century pele tower with 18th and 19th century additions.

A little over a mile to the south-west, Weetwood Hall is another medieval tower house, altered and extended in the 18th and 19th centuries.
