= Kirknewton railway station (Northumberland) =

Disused railway station in Kirknewton, Northumberland

Kirknewton
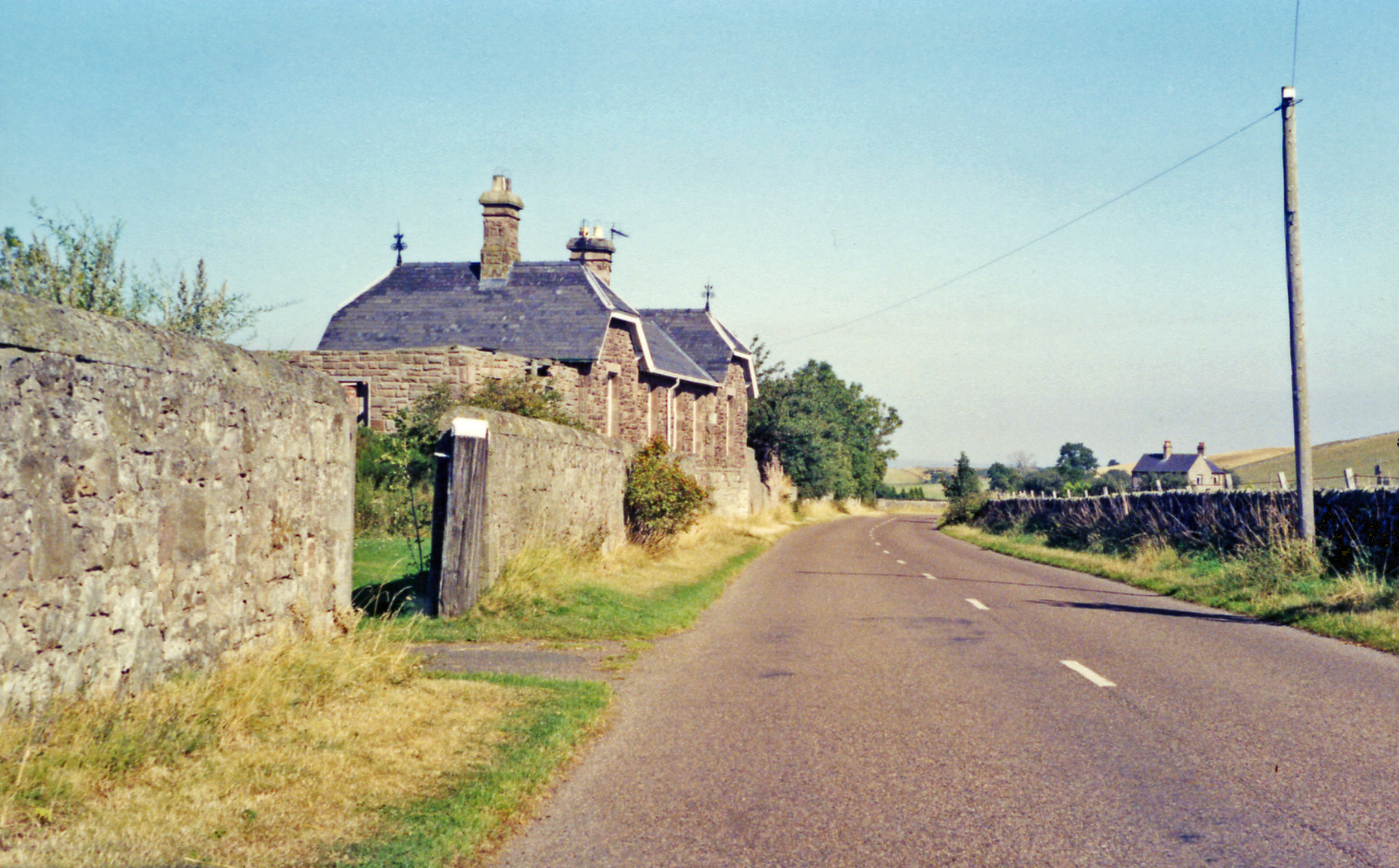
- The site of the station in 1991

General information
- Location: Kirknewton, Northumberland; England
- Coordinates: 55.5674°N 2.1442°W
- Grid reference: NT910304
- Platforms: 1

Other information
- Status: Disused

History
- Original company: North Eastern Railway
- Post-grouping: LNER

Key dates
- 5 September 1887: Opened
- 22 September 1930: Closed to passengers
- 30 March 1953: Closed completely
Location

Kirknewton railway station served the village of Kirknewton, Northumberland, England from 1887 to 1953 on the Cornhill Branch.

== History ==
The station opened on 5 September 1887 by the North Eastern Railway. It was situated on the north side of the B6351 approximately 1/4 mile from the village centre. The station closed to passengers on 22 September 1930 and to goods traffic on 30 March 1953, which was earlier than the northern part of the branch (in 1965). The station consisted of one passenger platform, as well as a marshalling yard for local freight. The bridge crossing the College Burn, a short way west of the station was damaged in floods in 1948, along with a bridge that was washed away near Mindrum.

== Today ==
Both the station building itself and the former Station Master's house are still in existence as private dwellings.

The original signal box also remains, now converted into a storage shed. There is also a prefabricated Nissen Hut and shed in the grounds of the Station Master's house.

The course of the permanent way (track since removed) can be clearly seen to the west and east of the station. Much of this is now used for farming purposes.

Preceding station	Disused railways	Following station
Mindrum; Line and station closed	Cornhill Branch	Akeld; Line and station closed
