= Twizell railway station =

Disused railway station in Belford, Northumberland

Twizell
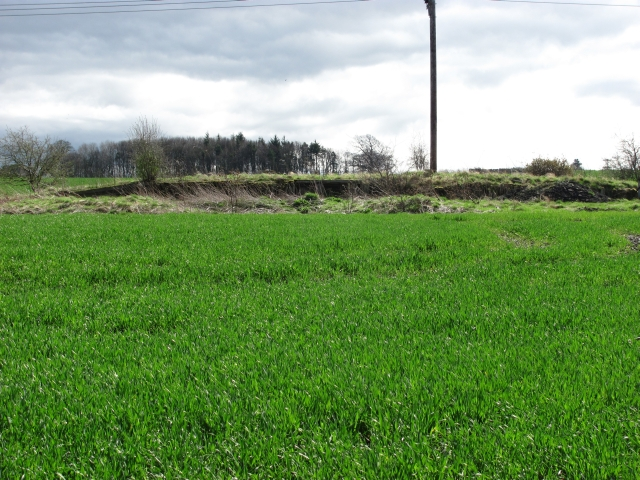
- The site of the station in 2011

General information
- Location: Twizell, Northumberland; England
- Coordinates: 55.6871°N 2.198°W
- Grid reference: NT876437
- Platforms: 2

Other information
- Status: Disused

History
- Original company: North Eastern Railway
- Pre-grouping: North Eastern Railway
- Post-grouping: LNER; British Railways (Scottish Region)

Key dates
- August 1861: Opened
- 4 July 1955: Closed
Location

Twizell railway station served the historic village of Twizell, Northumberland, England, from 1861 to 1955 on the Kelso Branch.

== History ==
The station opened in August 1861 by the North Eastern Railway. It was situated at the end of a minor road. Some timetables misspelled it as 'Twizel'. To the south was the goods yard, which opened in the 1880s. A goods siding was installed in 1882. On the up side of the line was a signal box, which opened in 1880, and was rebuilt from timber in 1900. In 1951 only 537 tickets were sold. On 9 December 1953, the station was downgraded to an unstaffed halt and the goods yard closed. The last passenger train called on 2 July 1955, with the station closing two days later.

Preceding station	Historical railways	Following station
Coldstream; Line and station closed	North Eastern Railway; Kelso Branch	Norham; Line and station closed
