= Milfield =

Village in Northumberland, England

Coordinates: 55.5950°N 2.1047°W

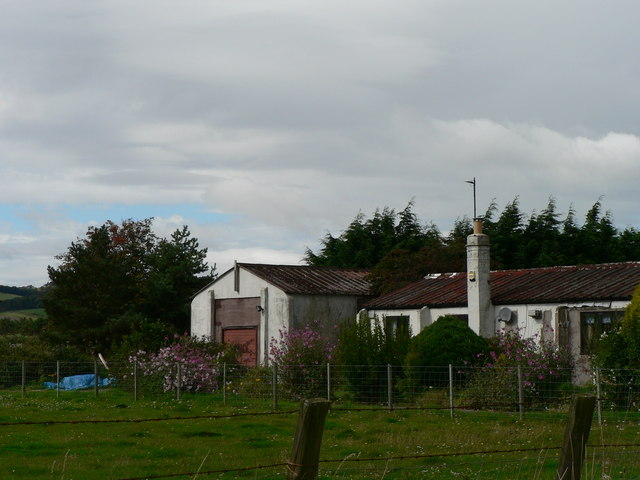
- Old RAF Buildings, Milfield

- Location within Northumberland
- Population: 315 (2011 census)
- OS grid reference: NT935335
- Unitary authority: Northumberland
- Ceremonial county: Northumberland
- Region: North East
- Country: England
- Sovereign state: United Kingdom
- Post town: WOOLER
- Postcode district: NE71
- Police: Northumbria
- Fire: Northumberland
- Ambulance: North East
- UK Parliament: North Northumberland

Milfield is a village in Northumberland, England about 3 miles (5 km) northwest of Wooler. The A697 road passes through the village.

== History ==
Milfield is the likely location of the Northumbrian royal settlement of Maelmin. According to Bede, a residence was built at Maelmin to supersede Edwin of Northumbria's residence of Ad-Gefrin at Yeavering. Evidence of a high-status Anglo-Saxon settlement at Milfield strongly suggests that this is the location of Maelmin, because of its proximity to Yeavering. Maelmin has been identified as a Brittonic place name with a probable meaning of 'decayed edge', though other Brittonic etymologies are also possible.

One of the many battles between the Scots and the English was fought on Milfield Plain, which is part of the bed of the prehistoric Lake of Glendale. In the month before the Battle of Flodden, some Scottish reivers, under Alexander Home, were returning from a raid into England where they had burnt several villages. Carrying stolen property, Home's men were confronted by a band of English under Sir William Bulmer of Brancepeth in County Durham. The Durham men won the battle and for many subsequent years, the Scots name for the road through Milfield was "The Ill Road". Many years after the rout of Home's men, General Monck waited at Milfield with his forces before his march south which brought about the Stuart Restoration.

During the Second World War, an air training unit operated from the nearby RAF Milfield.

== Notable people ==
Josephine Butler, a Victorian social reformer, was born at Milfield House. She was a prominent campaigner against the practice of child prostitution, and led an eventually successful effort to repeal the Contagious Diseases Acts (which granted the right for police to perform compulsory physical examinations on women suspected to be prostitutes). A college was named after her at Durham University and a residency block there was named Milfield in honour of her birthplace.
