= Great Whittington =

Village in Northumberland, England

Coordinates: 55.031°N 1.993°W

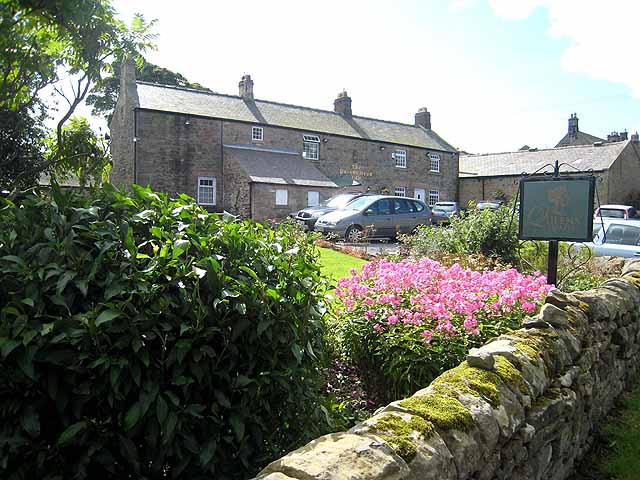
- The Queen's Head, Great Whittington

- Location within Northumberland
- OS grid reference: NZ004708
- Civil parish: Whittington
- Unitary authority: Northumberland
- Ceremonial county: Northumberland
- Region: North East
- Country: England
- Sovereign state: United Kingdom
- Post town: NEWCASTLE UPON TYNE
- Postcode district: NE19
- Dialling code: 01434
- Police: Northumbria
- Fire: Northumberland
- Ambulance: North East
- UK Parliament: Hexham

Great Whittington is a village in the civil parish of Whittington, in Northumberland, England, 7 miles NE of Hexham. In 2011 it had a population of 401.

== Governance ==
Great Whittington is in the parliamentary constituency of Hexham. Great Whittington was formerly a township in Corbridge parish, from 1866 Great Whittington was a civil parish in its own right until it was abolished on 1 April 1955 to form Whittington. In 1951 the parish had a population of 158.

== History ==
Immediately north of Great Whittington, in a field west of the Unnamed Road leading to Matfen, lies Great Whittington Royal Observer Corps Monitoring Post. This was 1 of approx. 1,563 underground monitoring posts built all over the UK during the Cold War to monitor the effects of a Nuclear Strike. They were operated by the ROC who were mostly civilian volunteers. Great Whittington ROC post was opened in June 1962 and closed in September 1992 after the collapse of the Soviet Union, which saw the end of the Cold War.

== Landmarks ==
The Devil's Causeway passes the village about 1 mile (2 km) to the west. The causeway was a Roman road which started at Portgate on Hadrian's Wall, north of Corbridge, and extended 55 miles (89 km) northwards across Northumberland to the mouth of the River Tweed at Berwick-upon-Tweed.

== Transport ==
Great Whittington is served by Go North East's 74 bus service, which provides four buses per day to Newcastle upon Tyne, Ponteland and Hexham.

== Religious sites ==
A now deconsecrated Wesleyan Methodist chapel can be found on the northern side of the village green, distinguishable by a large cross above the door.

== See also ==
- Halton
- Matfen
