= Velvet Hall railway station =

Former railway station in England

Coordinates: 55.73513°N 2.09118°W

Velvet Hall

General information
- Location: Horncliffe, Northumberland; England
- Grid reference: NT943490
- Platforms: 2

Other information
- Status: Disused

History
- Original company: York, Newcastle and Berwick Railway
- Pre-grouping: North Eastern Railway
- Post-grouping: London and North Eastern Railway

Key dates
- 27 July 1849: Station opened
- 4 July 1955: Station closed to passengers
- 29 March 1965: closure to goods
Location

Velvet Hall railway station was a railway station which served the village of Horncliffe in Northumberland, England.

== History ==
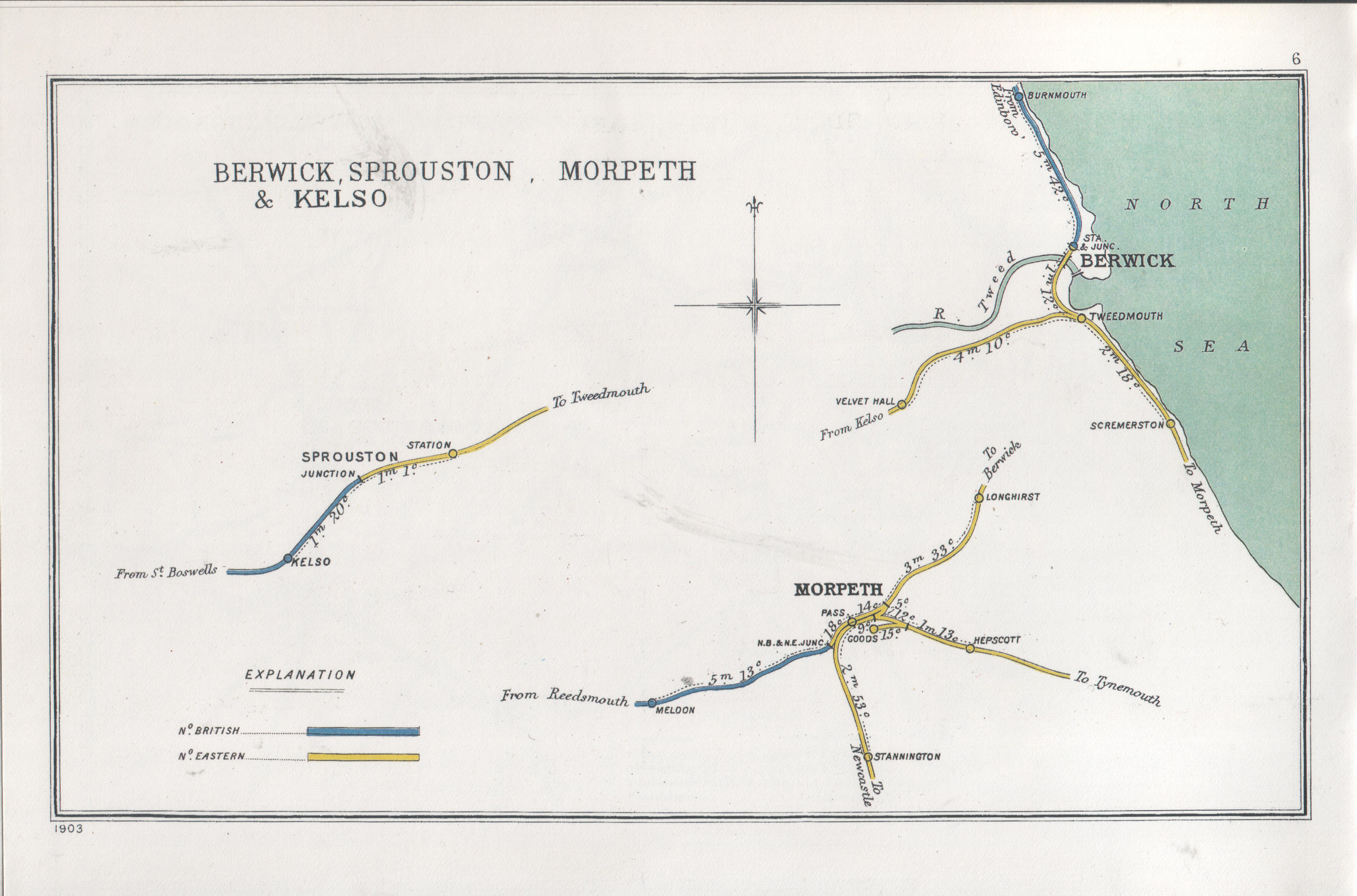
A 1903 Railway Clearing House map showing (upper right) railways in the vicinity of Velvet Hall

The station opened on 27 July 1849. It was situated on the Kelso Branch of the York, Newcastle and Berwick Railway, being the first station after the junction at Tweedmouth.

The station was host to a LNER camping coach from 1935 to 1939 and possibly one for some of 1934. The station closed for passengers on 4 July 1955 and completely on 29 March 1965.

== Routes ==
Preceding station	Disused railways	Following station
Norham; Line and station closed	North Eastern Railway; Kelso Branch	Tweedmouth; Line and station closed
