= Devil's Causeway =

Roman road in England

- Roman Road
- Location in Northumberland

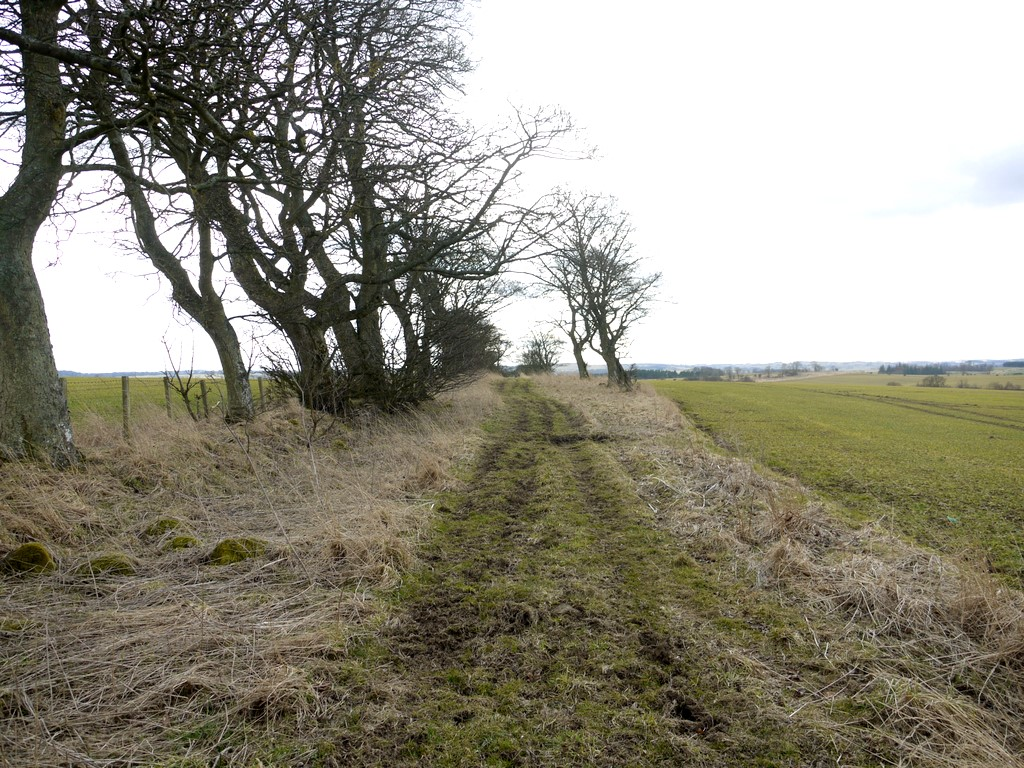
- Devil's Causeway near Hartburn, Northumberland Northumberland

Route information
- Length: 55 mi (89 km)
- Time period: Roman Britain
- Margary number: 87

Major junctions
- From: Bewclay
- To: Berwick-upon-Tweed

Location
- Country: United Kingdom

Road network
- Roman roads in Britannia

The Devil's Causeway is a Roman road in Northumberland, in North East England. It branches off Dere Street north of Corbridge and can be traced through Northumberland for about 55 miles (89 km) north to Berwick-upon-Tweed.

== Description ==
The Devil's Causeway is a Roman roadway that is thought to pre-date Hadrian's Wall. It started at the Portgate, slightly north of Corbridge, where it branched off the Roman Dere Street (A68 road) as it continues north into Redesdale on its way to Caledonia. The Devil's Causeway continued to near the mouth of the River Tweed at Berwick-upon-Tweed, where it was used to support a presumed military port.

Less than 1 mile (2 km) to the east of the Portgate is the Roman fort of Onnum, also known as Halton Chesters. It is probable that the Causeway was patrolled by a cavalry unit based there.

The fort at Halton Chesters was built across the line of the wall facing north, halfway between milecastles 21 and 22 about 0.5 miles (0.80 km) east of Dere Street. The original Hadrianic fort was rather squat in outline, almost square, measuring some 440 feet north-south by 400 feet east-west, with an area of just over 4 acres (c. 134 x 122 m; 1.6 ha).

LEG VI V P F FEC

"The Victorious Sixth Legion, Loyal and Faithful, made this."

A dedicatory slab from the west gate of the fort tells how the Sixth Legion were responsible for the initial building work but does not give the name of the original garrison. It is likely, but not proven, that the Hadrianic unit was a cohors quingenaria equitata, an auxiliary force containing a nominal five-hundred men, approximately half of whom were mounted. Units of this type have been identified at many wall forts, and would have been ideally placed here, the infantry contingent to guard the Fort and Wall, and the cavalry to patrol along Dere Street and the Devil's Causeway to the north.

The road passes by Great Whittington, then north-east to Hartburn, where just to the west it crosses the Hart Burn, a tributary of the River Wansbeck. It continues to the east of Netherwitton, where there was a much-discussed tower.

Devil's Causeway Tower, Netherwitton, was also known as or recorded in historical documents as Highbush Wood. King writes, "Marked on some OS maps as tower but now considered to be remains of cottage." The local sites and monuments record still records it as "site of tower". Long records it as "remains of an irregular shaped tower". This site has been described as a Pele Tower. The confidence that this site is a medieval fortification or palace is questionable.

After Netherwitton, the road passes to the west of Longhorsley. It continues east of north until it crosses the River Coquet east of Brinkburn Priory, where it starts to head west by north, passing the western edge of Longframlington. North of Longframlington the road touches the A697 road, then crosses it before passing west of Edlingham. Near the village of Whittingham, there was a Roman fort at Learchild, from here a road headed west to meet Dere Street at Bremenium (High Rochester). Just north of the fort, the road re-crosses the A697 before passing Glanton and reaching Powburn.

At Powburn the A697 follows the course of the Devil's Causeway to cross the River Breamish and stays with it for 2 miles (3.2 km). The Roman road then heads west by north, passing Newtown, Northumberland, before crossing the River Till just before Horton. At Horton the road continues as a C road for 7 miles (11 km) past Lowick.

The village of Lowick can be found in the northern part of Northumberland, 470 feet above sea level, about 9 miles (14 km) south of Berwick-upon-Tweed and 7 miles (11 km) north-east of Wooler. The ancient road used by the monks of Lindisfarne to Durham crosses the Devil's Causeway here – it was at this crossroads that Lowick began to develop.

The road then passes through Berrington, before heading towards Tweedmouth and the mouth of the River Tweed.

== See also ==
- Roman roads in Britain
