= Coldstream railway station =

Former railway station in Northumberland, England

Coordinates: 55.64945°N 2.21868°W

Coldstream

General information
- Location: Cornhill on Tweed, Coldstream, Northumberland; England
- Grid reference: NT862395
- Platforms: 2

Other information
- Status: Disused

History
- Original company: York, Newcastle and Berwick Railway
- Pre-grouping: North Eastern Railway
- Post-grouping: London and North Eastern Railway, North Eastern Region of British Railways

Key dates
- 27 July 1849: Station opens as Cornhill
- 1 October 1873: Station renamed Coldstream
- 15 June 1964: Closed to passengers
- 29 March 1965: Goods services withdrawn
Location

Coldstream railway station was a train station that served the town of Coldstream, in Berwickshire, Scotland until 1964; however, the station was sited across the River Tweed in Northumberland, England. It was a stop on both the Cornhill Branch, which ran from Alnwick to Cornhill Junction on the Kelso line near Coldstream, and the Kelso to Tweedmouth line.

== History ==
Authorised in 1845, the Kelso Branch was built by the North Eastern Railway to link the communities of the Tweed Valley with the fledgling railway network at Tweedmouth. The line opened in two stages: to Sprouston on 27 July 1849 and to Kelso on 1 June 1851.

The Cornhill Branch project was authorised in 1882 to link the farming communities of north Northumberland with the market town of Alnwick, and link the North Eastern Railway's Kelso line to its Alnwick Branch.

Construction started by the North Eastern Railway in 1884. The line opened to freight between Cornhill and Wooperton on 2 May 1887, with the whole line opening for both freight and passengers on 5 September of the same year.

The line had difficulty attracting passengers, as many of the stations were some distance from the communities they served. Increased bus competition in the 1920s led to passenger trains being withdrawn on 22 September 1930, although the service resumed briefly during the Second World War to serve RAF Milfield near Akeld.

After a severe storm in August 1948 washed away a bridge north of Ilderton station in Northumberland, British Railways, which had recently taken over the line, decided that the volume of traffic along the line did not warrant replacing it. The line was thus split into two: Alnwick to Ilderton and Coldstream to Wooler, which included Akeld.

This, coupled with an infrequent service, caused the line to go further into decline and the section from Alnwick to Ilderton closed on 2 March 1953; the other section following suit on 29 March 1965.

On 15 June 1964, passenger services were withdrawn along the whole line between Tweedmouth and St Boswells. Freight services between Tweedmouth and Kelso followed suit the next year on 29 March with the complete closure of the line. Only one track of the double line between Kelso and Tweedmouth was lifted initially; all track was removed in 1969 from St Boswells through to Tweedmouth, following closure of the freight service to Kelso and complete closure of the Waverley Route.

== Services ==
Preceding station	Disused railways	Following station
Terminus	North Eastern Railway; Cornhill branch line	Mindrum
Sunilaws	North Eastern Railway; Kelso Branch	Twizell

== The site today ==
The station has been demolished and a housing estate occupies the site.
