= Embleton Hall =

Coordinates: 55.305°N 1.797°W

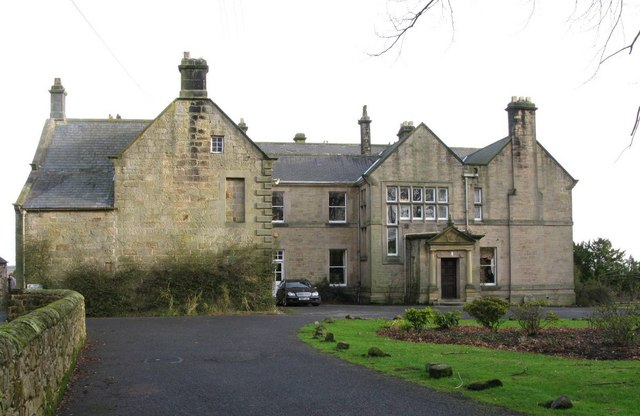
Embleton Hall

Embleton Hall is a country manor house in the small ex-mining village of Longframlington, Northumberland, England. It is a Grade II listed building.

The house was originally built in 1730 but has been extended several times since then. From the 1990s until 2013 it was used a small hotel and is now a private residence again.

The two-storey stone building is set in 5 acres (2.0 ha) of grounds including woodland.

== History ==
Built in 1730 by Thomas Embleton, it was later bought by the Fenwick family in 1780. An extension to the east of the building is also from the 18th century as is a further extension which was added in 1893. It remained in the Fenwick Family until it was acquired by Trevor Thorne, a former banker, and his wife in 1986, who turned it into a small hotel. There was also a restaurant serving lunchtime food. It was then bought by a couple from Tynemouth in 2013 for £875,000, with the Thornes continuing to live in the stable block.

The building was listed as a Grade II listed building in October 1953.

== Architecture ==
The two-storey stone building has slate roofs. The five-bay old house which now forms the west wing has rusticated quoins and pilasters and a frieze at the doorway. There are sash windows. The west front, which now forms the entrance, has a projecting porch with a pediment. The interior includes panelling in some of the rooms and stone or marble fireplaces.

The house stands within 5 acres (2.0 ha) of grounds including deciduous woodland. It also has a tennis court.
