= A697 road =

Road in Northumberland & southern Scotland

A697

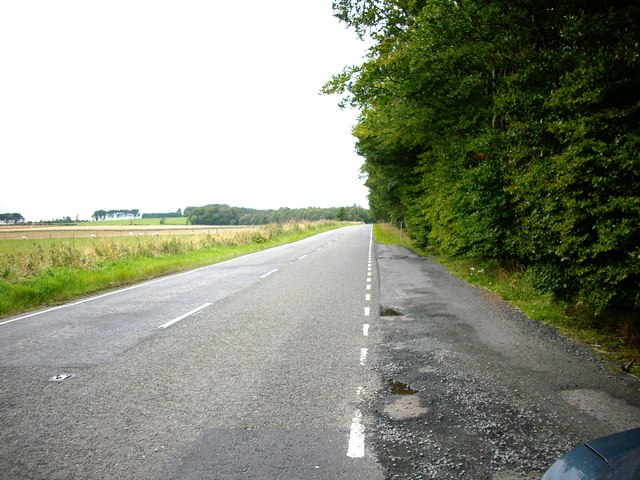
- Long straight on the A697 trunk road in Berwickshire

Route information
- Length: 68 mi (109 km)

Major junctions
- South end: Morpeth; 55.1877°N 1.7155°W
- A1 A698 A6105 A6089; A68
- North end: Oxton; 55.7711°N 2.7874°W

Location
- Country: United Kingdom

Road network
- Roads in the United Kingdom; Motorways; A and B road zones
← A696	→ A698

The A697 is a road that can be used an alternative to the A1 for those travelling between Scotland and England via the North East.

== Route ==
It connects Morpeth on the A1 to the A68 at Oxton, near Edinburgh. The road runs via Wooler and Coldstream, and passes through a largely rural area of the Scottish Borders.

== Devil's Causeway ==
Stretches of the route overlay the Devil's Causeway, a Roman road.

== Speed ==
The A697 is around 15 miles (24 km) shorter and an average time of 23 minutes quicker than travelling up the A1, according to figures from the RAC route planner.

== Settlements on route ==
The road runs through

- Morpeth
- Espley
- Longhorsley
- Weldon
- Longframlington
- Thrunton
- Powburn
- Wooperton
- Haugh Head
- Wooler
- Low Humbleton
- Akeld
- Milfield
- Crookham
- Cornhill on Tweed
- Coldstream
- Orange Lane
- Greenlaw
- Houndslow
- Thirlestane
- Oxton
