= Hedgeley railway station =

Disused railway station in Hedgeley, Northumberland

Hedgeley
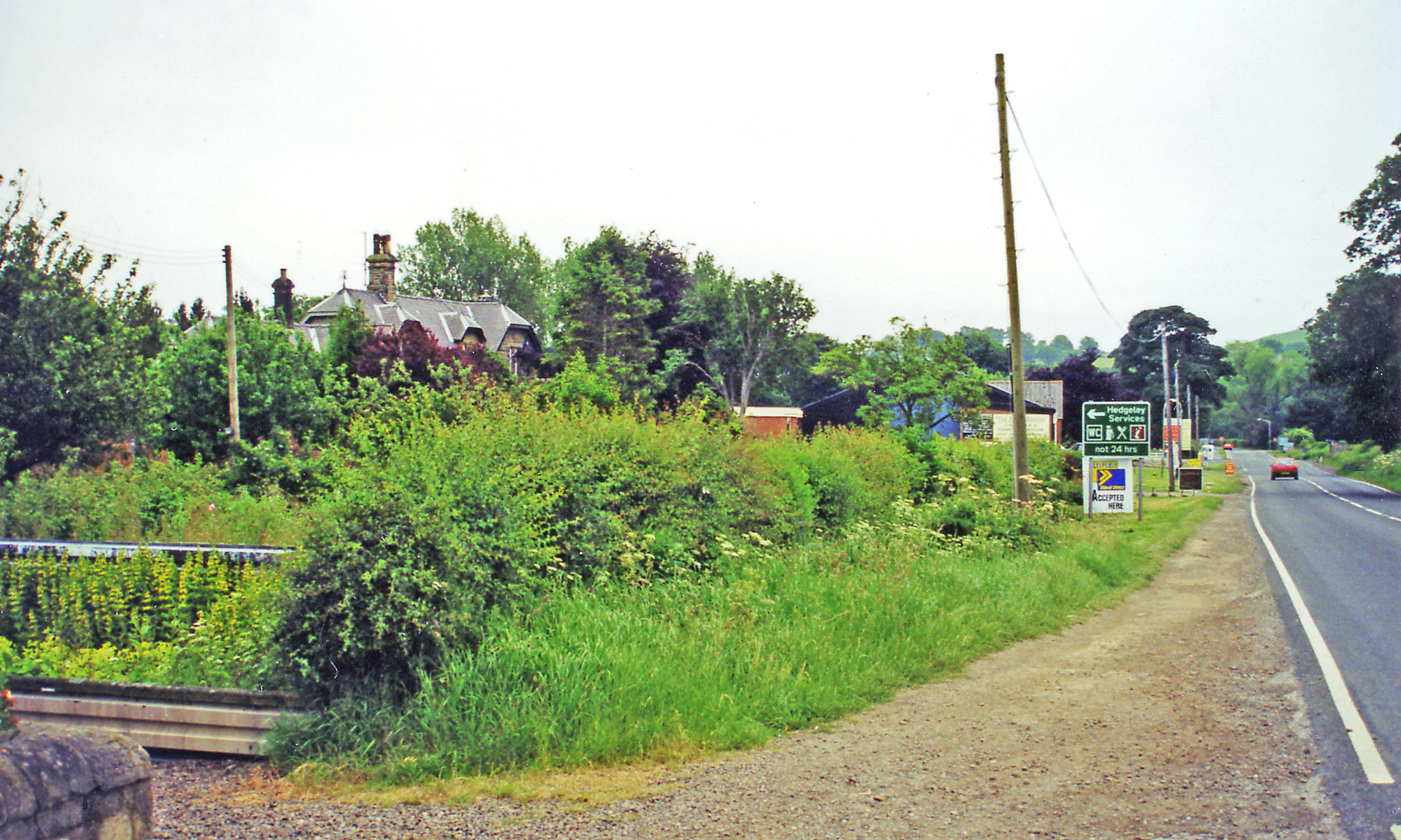
- The site of the station in 2000

General information
- Location: Hedgeley, Northumberland; England
- Coordinates: 55.446°N 1.9066°W
- Grid reference: NU060169
- Platforms: 1

Other information
- Status: Disused

History
- Original company: North Eastern Railway
- Pre-grouping: North Eastern Railway
- Post-grouping: LNER

Key dates
- 5 September 1887: Opened
- 22 September 1930: Closed to passengers
- 2 March 1953: Closed completely
Location

Hedgeley railway station served the area of Hedgeley, Northumberland, England from 1887 to 1953 on the Cornhill Branch.

== History ==
The station opened on 5 September 1887 by the North Eastern Railway. It was situated at the back of a sizable courtyard. There were four sidings, one having a loop, one running through the goods shed and another serving coal drops. The station closed to passengers on 22 September 1930 and to goods traffic on 2 March 1953.

Preceding station	Disused railways	Following station
Wooperton; Line and station closed	North Eastern Railway; Cornhill Branch	Glanton; Line and station closed
