= Norham railway station =

Disused railway station in Norham, Northumberland

Norham

General information
- Location: Norham, Northumberland; England
- Coordinates: 55.7141°N 2.1495°W
- Grid reference: NT907467
- Platforms: 2

Other information
- Status: Disused

History
- Original company: York, Newcastle and Berwick Railway
- Pre-grouping: North Eastern Railway
- Post-grouping: LNER

Key dates
- 27 July 1849: Opened
- 15 June 1964: Closed to passengers
- 29 March 1965: Closed to goods
Location

Norham railway station served the village of Norham, Northumberland, England, from 1849 to 1965 on the Kelso Branch.

== History ==
The station opened on 27 July 1849 by the York, Newcastle and Berwick Railway.It was situated on Norham Road Station off the B6470. It didn't attract many passengers but the goods yard was busy throughout its life. A signal box was built on the down platform in 1880 but it closed in January 1902, being replaced by another near the ramp of the up platform. On the down side were five sidings; one served a coal depot and two served a lime depot. Another siding to the south served a goods warehouse and another served a dock. The station was later downgraded to an unstaffed halt and the down platform was shortened to provide easier access for the signal box. Only 701 passengers were recorded in 1951 but this figure was still higher than Twizell and Velvet Hall. The station closed to passengers on 15 June 1964 and closed to goods traffic on 29 March 1965. After closure the station became a private house.

Preceding station	Historical railways	Following station
Twizell; Line and station closed	North Eastern Railway; Kelso Branch	Velvet Hall; Line and station closed
