= Longframlington =

Coordinates: 55.2984°N 1.7889°W

- Village
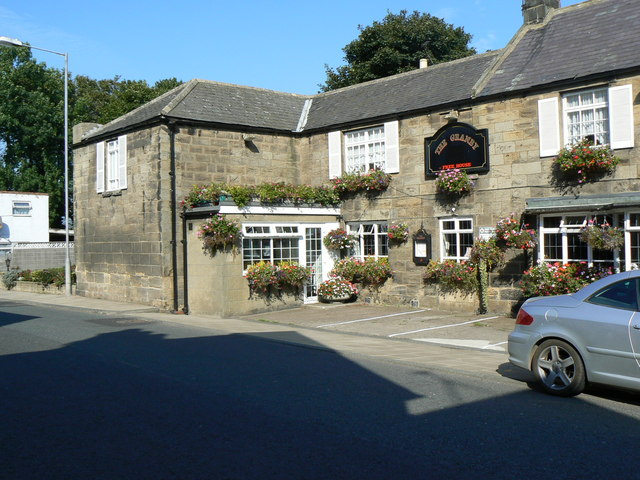
- The Granby Inn, Longframlington

- Location within Northumberland
- Population: 1,360 (2021 census)
- OS grid reference: NU135005
- Shire county: Northumberland
- Region: North East
- Country: England
- Sovereign state: United Kingdom
- Post town: MORPETH
- Postcode district: NE65
- Police: Northumbria
- Fire: Northumberland
- Ambulance: North East
- UK Parliament: North Northumberland

Longframlington is a small village in Northumberland, England, located on the A697, 11 miles (18 km) north-west of Morpeth and 5 miles (8 km) south-east of Rothbury. Longframlington is a former pit village and on the site of the pit now stands Fram Park, a log cabin holiday park. The village was previously the site of the Longframlington Music Festival.

== Landmarks ==
A branch of the Roman road, Dere Street, known as the Devil's Causeway, passes close by Longframlington en route to Berwick-upon-Tweed, and the mounds visible on the Hall Hill in the angle of the Pauperhaugh and Weldon Bridge roads may be those of a Roman camp.

Embleton Hall is a country manor house which was built around 1730 and is a Grade II listed building.

Longframlington has a Tank Turn in the local park, used during WW2.

== Religious sites ==
The church of St Mary the Virgin dates from the late 12th century and until 1891 was a chapel of ease to Felton; since that date Longframlington has been an independent parish. The church was carefully restored in the late 19th century retaining its fine Norman chancel arch. The church is identified as being dedicated to St. Laurence on maps of Longframlington shown on website Communities.Northumberland.gov.uk (Longframlington - Ordnance maps) dated 1897 and 1920.
