= Mindrum =

Village in Northumberland, England

Coordinates: 55.590°N 2.253°W

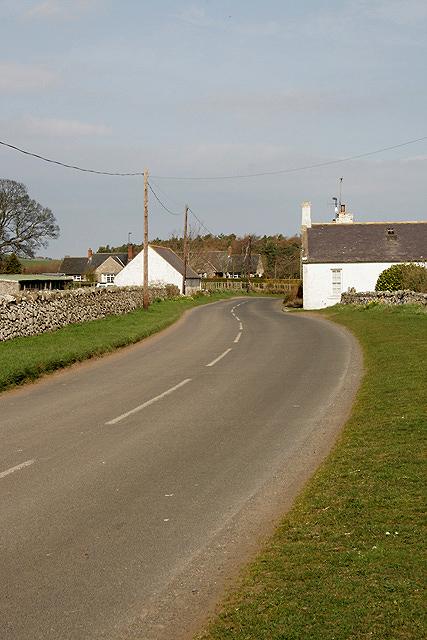
- B6352 at Mindrum

- Location within Northumberland
- OS grid reference: NT845325
- Civil parish: Carham
- Unitary authority: Northumberland
- Ceremonial county: Northumberland
- Region: North East
- Country: England
- Sovereign state: United Kingdom
- Post town: MINDRUM
- Postcode district: TD12
- Dialling code: 01890
- Police: Northumbria
- Fire: Northumberland
- Ambulance: North East
- UK Parliament: North Northumberland

Mindrum is a village in the civil parish of Carham, in Northumberland, England. Now little more than a postal address, it forms the centre of a number of farms.

== Geography ==
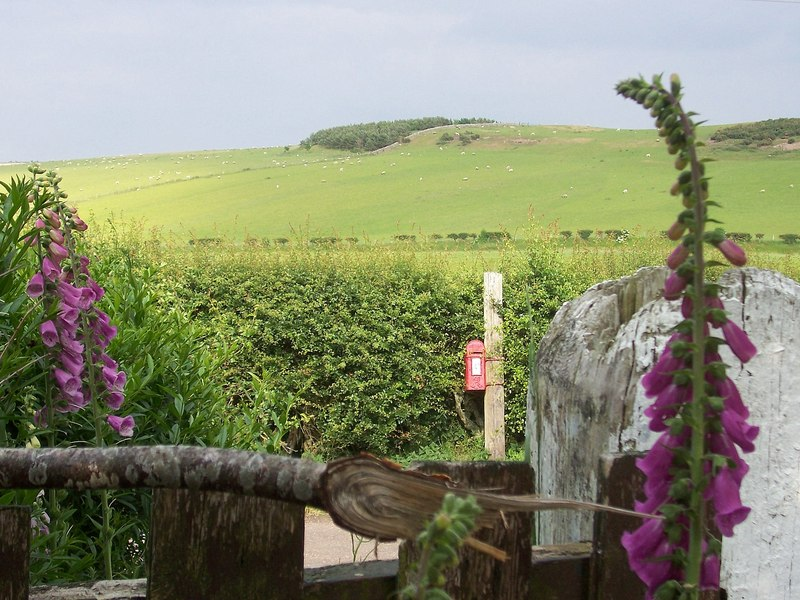
Postbox at Mindrum railway station

Mindrum is located on the North West Foothills of the Cheviot Hills on the Bowmont Water, one of the Tributaries of the River Tweed. Whilst the term Mountain may be optimistic, the village is flanked by a clear ridge running from Camp Hill to the Mindrum Mill Crag on its North West Flank.

== Etymology ==
The name Mindrum is thought to be of Cumbric origin. It can be explained as a compound of the words equivalent to Welsh mynydd, 'mountain' and drum, 'ridge'. Mindrum appears to have the same etymology as Mynydd y Drum, Wales. Whilst the term 'mountain' may be optimistic, the village is flanked by a clear ridge running from Camp Hill to the Mindrum Mill Crag on its North West Flank. Although the word "Min" in Welsh means an "edge". Thus an alternative, and perhaps more logical, etymology is "edge of the ridge".

== Governance ==
Mindrum is in the parliamentary constituency of North Northumberland.
