= Ilderton railway station =

Disused railway station in Northumberland, England

Ilderton
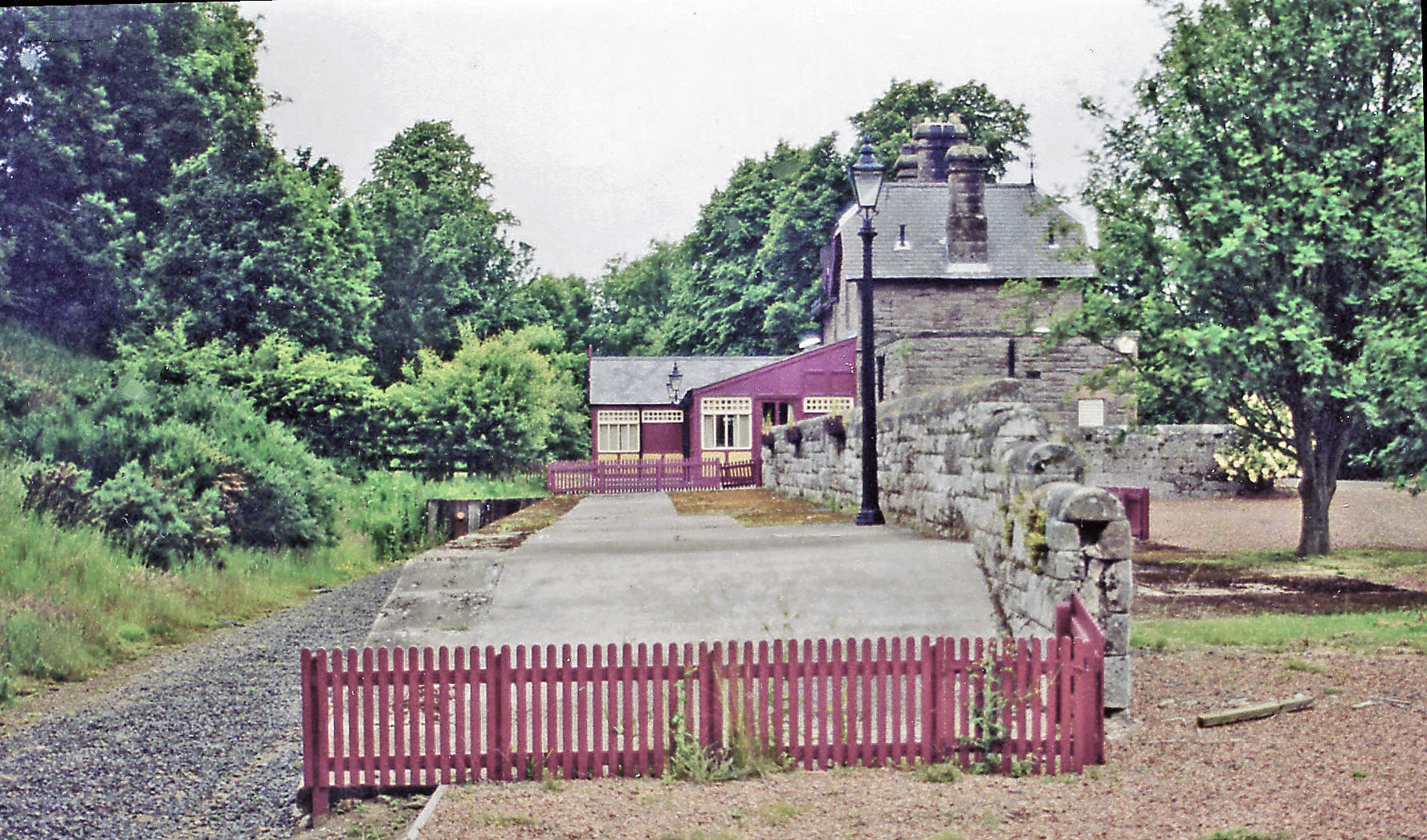
- The site of the station in 2000

General information
- Location: Ilderton, Northumberland, England
- Coordinates: 55.5062°N 1.9711°W
- Grid reference: NU019236
- Platforms: 1

Other information
- Status: Disused

History
- Original company: North Eastern Railway
- Post-grouping: London and North Eastern Railway

Key dates
- 5 September 1887: Opened
- 22 September 1930: Closed to passengers
- 2 March 1953: Closed completely
Location

Ilderton railway station served the village of Ilderton, in Northumberland, England, between 1887 and 1953. It was a stop on the Cornhill Branch, which connected Alnwick and Cornhill.

== History ==
The station opened on 5 September 1887 by the North Eastern Railway. It was situated on the west side of the A697. There were a wide range of buildings, including the station building, a stone warehouse, coal and lime drops, an office, and livestock loading facilities. There were four sidings: one serving the goods shed and three serving a goods platform.

In 1911, the station sold 4,279 tickets, with the population of the local village being 1,252.

It closed to passengers on 22 September 1930 and to goods traffic on 2 March 1953.

Preceding station	Disused railways	Following station
Wooler; Line and station closed	North Eastern Railway; Cornhill Branch	Wooperton; Line and station closed

== The site today ==
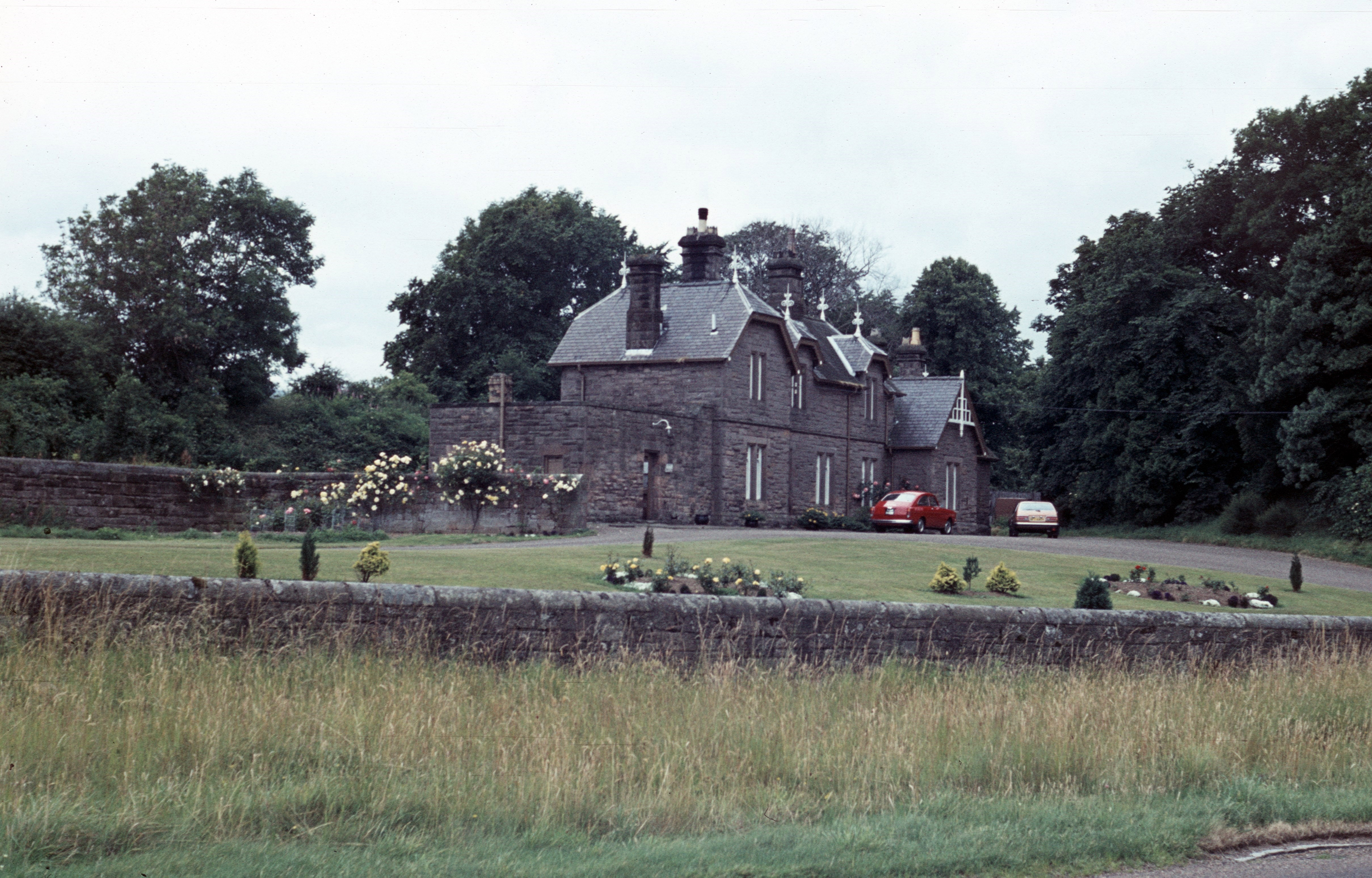
The station building in 1981

The station is largely intact, although the goods yard buildings have been demolished over time; the main building has been extended and converted into a restaurant. The railway cottages are extant.
