= Humbleton Hill =

Hill in Northumberland, England

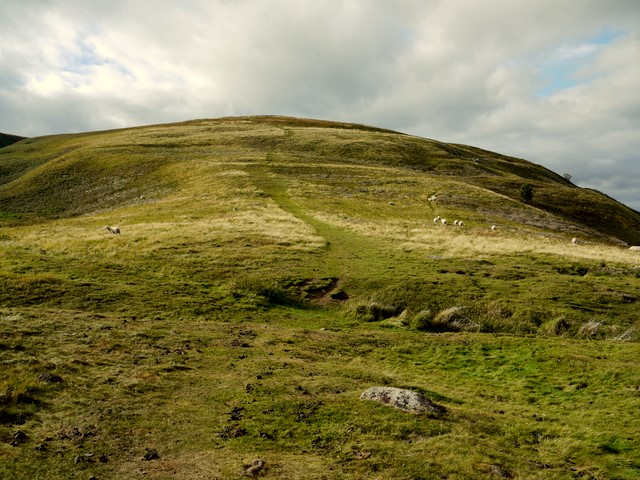
- Viewed from the east

- Location within Northumberland
- 55°32′53″N 2°3′14″W
- Type: Hillfort
- Periods: Neolithic; Iron Age
- Location: near Wooler
- OS grid reference: NT 967 283

Site notes
- Elevation: 298 m (978 ft)

Scheduled monument
- Designated: 24 September 1934
- Reference no.: 1016714

Humbleton Hill is a hill in Northumberland, England, about 1.5 miles (2.4 km) west of Wooler.

It is the location of the Battle of Homildon Hill of 1402, between English and Scottish armies. There is an archaeological site on the summit, with remains of an enclosed settlement of the Neolithic Age and a later Iron Age hillfort. It is a scheduled monument.

== Description ==
The hill is part of the Cheviot Hills. Its height is 298 metres (978 ft), with a prominence of 62 metres (203 ft).

=== Prehistory ===
There are remains of a hillfort of the Iron Age, within an earlier enclosure thought to be of the Neolithic or Bronze Age. The earlier enclosure has an irregular shape and measures up to 290 metres (950 ft) west to east and 210 metres (690 ft) north to south. It is defined by a low bank of earth and stone; on the south side a steep ravine adds to the defence. At the south-west corner, large stones set on edge probably mark the original entrance, 4 metres (13 ft) wide.

The more massive inner enclosure, dating from the Iron Age, measures 110 metres (360 ft) both north to south and west to east. A stone bank about 10 metres (33 ft) wide is the remains of the rampart; there is a second rampart on the east side, now a bank of loose stones 9.5 metres (31 ft) wide. On the south side the edge of the ravine provides the defence, and there is no rampart. The entrance is on the south-east, 1.5 metres (4 ft 11 in) wide, marked by boulders.

There are traces of 20 roundhouses, diameter 4 to 8 metres (13 to 26 ft), within the inner rampart, and about 8 roundhouses between the ramparts. There are remains of some small enclosures, thought to be medieval shielings or livestock pens, set against the hillfort enclosure and the outer bank.
