= Tweedmouth railway station =

Disused railway station in Northumberland, England

Tweedmouth
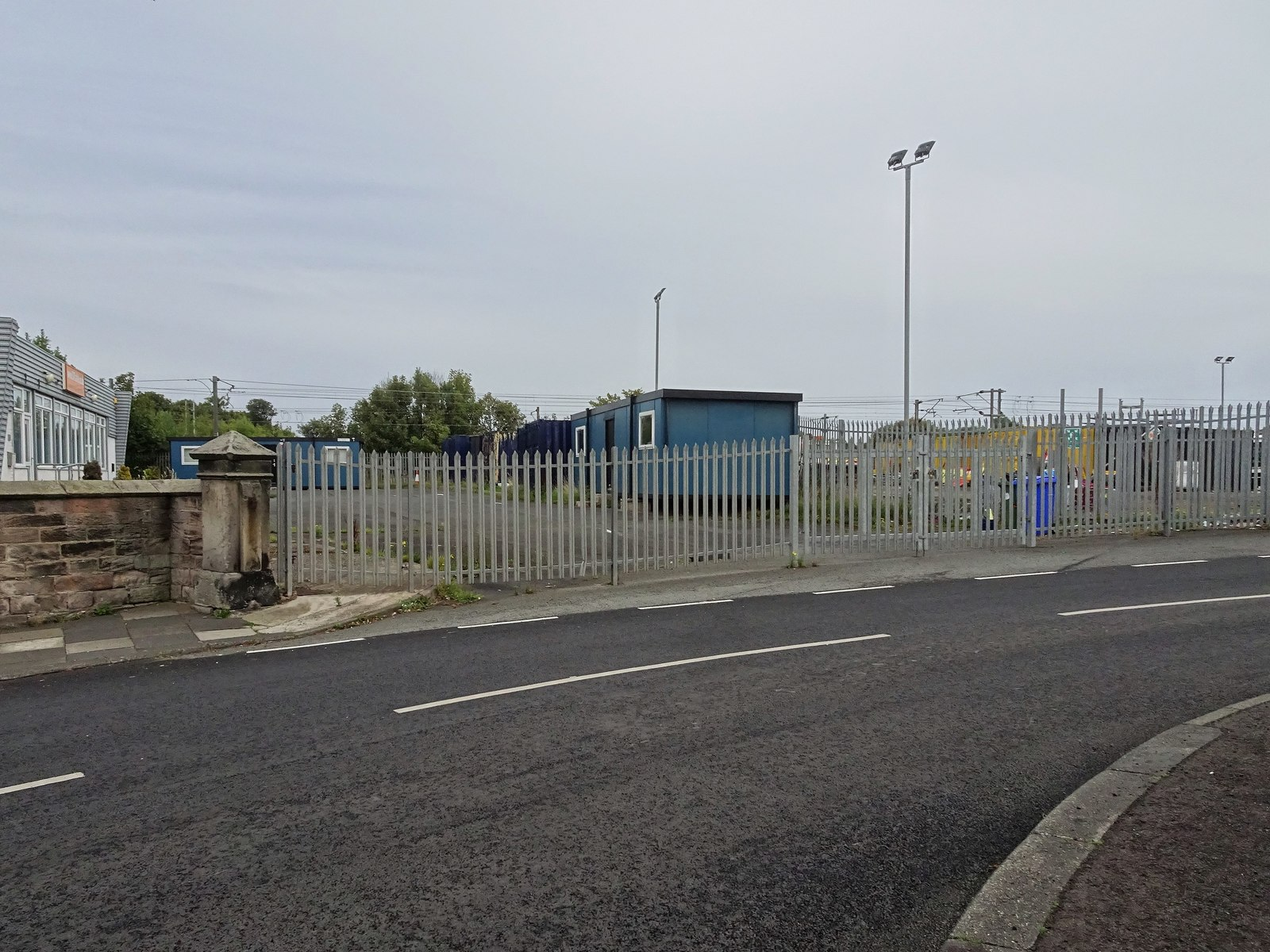
- The site of the station in 2018

General information
- Location: Tweedmouth, Northumberland; England
- Coordinates: 55.761°N 2.008°W
- Grid reference: NT994519
- Platforms: 2

Other information
- Status: Disused

History
- Original company: Newcastle and Berwick Railway
- Pre-grouping: North Eastern Railway
- Post-grouping: London and North Eastern Railway; North Eastern Region of British Railways

Key dates
- 29 March 1847: Station opens
- 15 June 1964: Closed to passengers
Location

Tweedmouth railway station was a railway station which served the Tweedmouth area of Berwick-on-Tweed in Northumberland, England. It was located on the East Coast Main Line. As well as a railway station for passengers, it was also the main service yard and goods yard between Newcastle upon Tyne and Edinburgh. Also Tweedmouth station was the terminus for the Tweed Valley Railway line (opened in 1849), which connected the East Coast Main Line with the Waverley Line at Newtown St. Boswells. The station lies to the south of the Royal Border Bridge.

It was opened on 29 March 1847 and initially was the terminus on the East Coast Main Line as the Royal Border Bridge was not yet complete, so trains could not pass over the River Tweed. Once the Royal Border Bridge had been completed in 1850 and opened by Queen Victoria, trains had an unbroken run from London to Edinburgh.

The station was designed (like all the other Newcastle and Berwick Railway ones) by Benjamin Green, but was considerably more ornate - costing over £8600 to construct (due to company chairman George Hudson's insistence that it be as ornate as the North British Railway's depot on the other side of the River Tweed). The main single-storey building was on the southbound side, with a two-storey hotel and refreshment room attached to it at its northern end. Behind this were the two active platforms, which were served by loops off the main running lines. A substantial goods shed was also built, along with a four track locomotive depot in 1850. Despite this, its proximity to the main Berwick station (which was barely a mile (1.6 km) to the north) meant that it remained little more than a wayside halt for mainline local trains and the Kelso branch throughout its lifetime.

However it was considerably more important in operational terms for the NER, who used it as a major goods traffic hub and locomotive stabling and maintenance facility; they expanded the original loco depot significantly in 1877–8 and added a goods warehouse and accompanying sidings in 1902–3. After the 1923 Grouping, the London and North Eastern Railway concentrated all of its shed provision there, closing the old North British depot at Berwick station as part of the rebuild there in 1927.

After nationalisation in 1948, usage of the station gradually declined; by 1960, only a single train to and from Newcastle called each weekday, along with two in each direction on the Kelso and Newtown St Boswells branch line. British Railways closed the station to passengers on 15 June 1964 (along with the Kelso branch), a victim of the Beeching Axe. The loco shed suffered a similar fate two years later, though goods traffic continued to be handled until October 1984.

The station buildings were subsequently demolished, but a number of engineers' sidings remain on the eastern side, along with the 1961 power signal box that supervises the main line from the Scottish border southwards towards Alnmouth and a number of former railway staff cottages.

Preceding station	Historical railways	Following station
Scremerston; Line open, station closed	North Eastern Railway; East Coast Main Line	Berwick-upon-Tweed; Line and station open
	Disused railways	
Velvet Hall; Line and station closed	North Eastern Railway; Kelso Branch	Terminus
