= Kelso Branch =

Former railway line in Scotland

Overview
- Locale: Northumberland
- Successor: North Eastern Railway

Technical
- Track gauge: 4 ft 8 1/2 in (1,435 mm)

The Kelso Branch was a 23.5 miles (37.8 km) twin track branch railway in Northumberland, England and Roxburghshire, Scotland that ran from Tweedmouth on the East Coast Main Line via seven intermediate stations to Kelso.

== History ==
Plans for a horse drawn railway between Berwick-upon-Tweed and Kelso were put forward as early as 1809. An Act of Parliament was passed in 1811 allowing the enterprise to proceed, but it was formally abandoned in 1827 after failing to secure sufficient investment. There was a brief flurry of interest in reviving the scheme in 1836, when estimates showed that the two towns could be linked by rail for the relatively modest sum of £100,000. Nevertheless, attempts to raise the necessary funds were once more unsuccessful.

In 1844, two rival proposals for a main line between Newcastle upon Tyne and Berwick were submitted to Parliament, both of which included the building of a branch to Kelso. The accepted bid was that of the Newcastle and Berwick Railway, supported by George Hudson.

=== Opening ===
Authorised in 1845 the Kelso Branch was built by the York, Newcastle and Berwick Railway to link the communities of the Tweed valley with the fledgling railway network at Tweedmouth. The line opened in two stages, to Sprouston on 27 July 1849, and to Kelso on 1 June 1851.

=== Alnwick Branch ===
In 1887 the Alnwick Branch was opened linking to the line just to the west of Coldstream station.

The Tweedmouth-Kelso-St Boswells line provided part of an alternative route when the East Coast Main Line was blocked north of Tweedmouth most notably when in August 1948 when the main line was closed for three months.

=== Closure ===
In 1955 all the stations on the line apart from Coldstream and Norham closed to passengers, and on 15 June 1964 passenger services were withdrawn along the whole line. Freight services between Tweedmouth and Kelso followed suit the next year on 29 March with the complete closure of the line. The Kelso to St Boswells section closed to all traffic on 30 March 1968. Only one track of the double line between Kelso and Tweedmouth was initially lifted, but all track was removed in 1969 from St Boswells through to Tweedmouth following closure of the freight service to Kelso and complete closure of the Waverley Route.

== See also ==
The Kelso and Jedburgh railway branch lines
