= Wooperton railway station =

Disused railway station in Wooperton, Northumberland

Wooperton
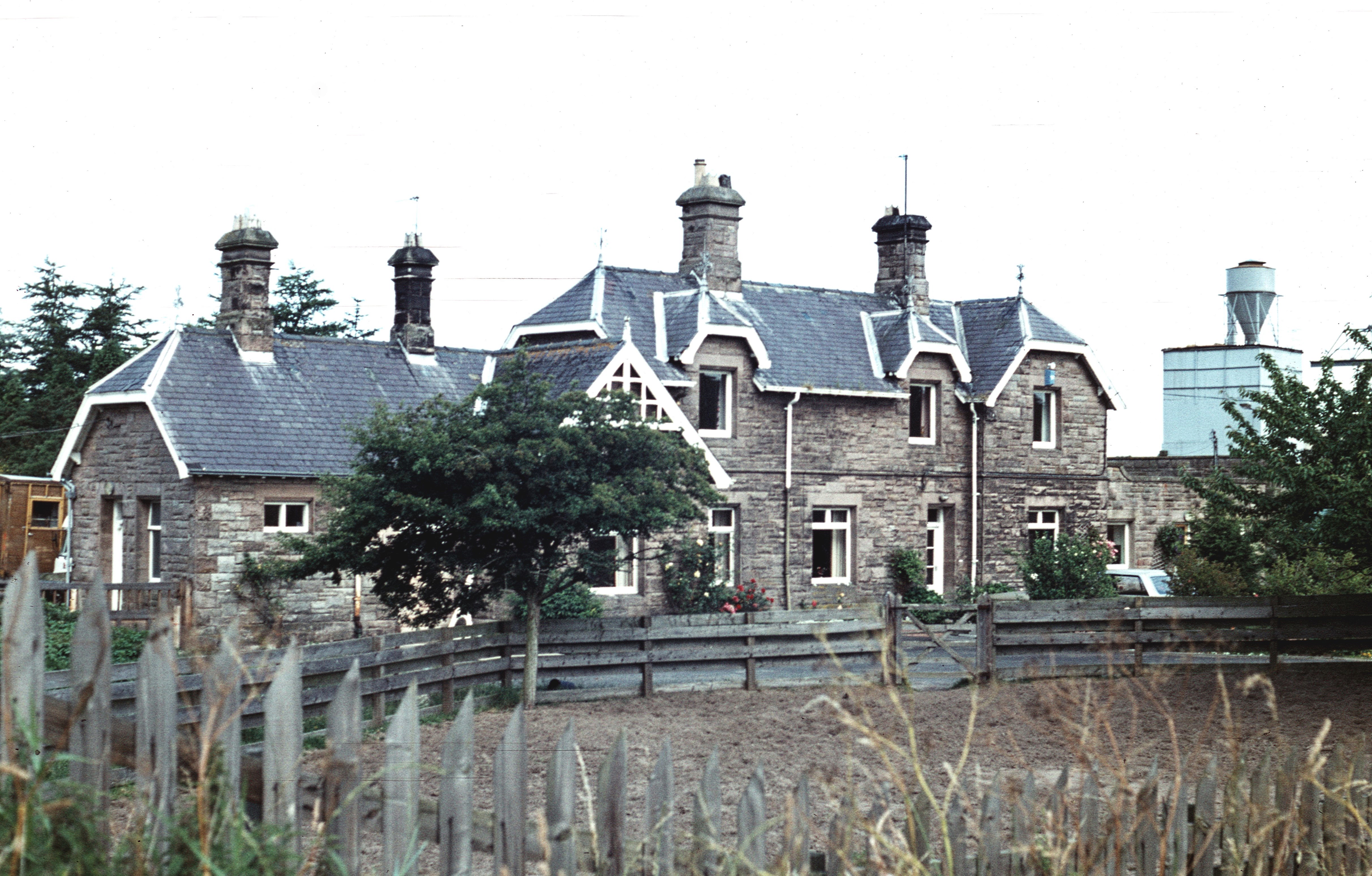
- The site of the station in 1981

General information
- Location: Wooperton, Northumberland; England
- Coordinates: 55.4745°N 1.9255°W
- Grid reference: NU048200
- Platforms: 1

Other information
- Status: Disused

History
- Original company: North Eastern Railway
- Post-grouping: LNER

Key dates
- 5 September 1887: Opened
- 22 September 1930: Closed to passengers
- 1 December 1954: Closed completely
Location

Wooperton railway station served the hamlet of Wooperton, Roddam, Northumberland, England from 1887 to 1954 on the Cornhill Branch.

== History ==
The station opened 5 September 1887 by the North Eastern Railway. It was situated immediately south of the B6346. The goods yard was situated east from the A697. The station closed to passengers on 22 September 1930 and to goods traffic on 1 December 1954. The station building and station master's house are now private residences.

Preceding station	Disused railways	Following station
Ilderton; Line and station closed	North Eastern Railway; Cornhill Branch	Hedgeley; Line and station closed
