= Wooler =

Town in Northumberland, England

Coordinates: 55.5461°N 2.0166°W

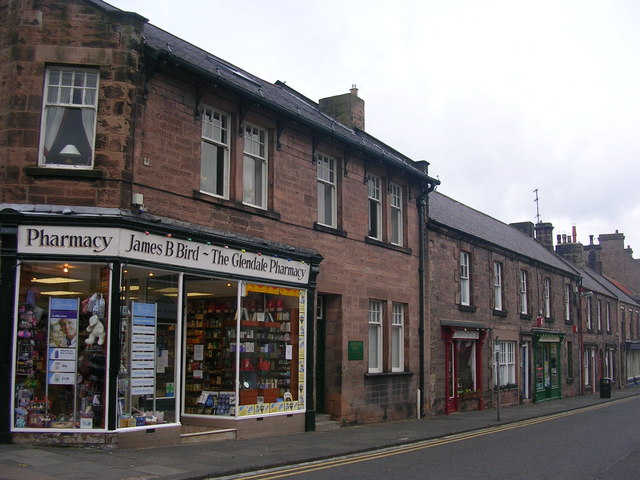
- Wooler Town Centre

- Location within Northumberland
- Population: 1,983 (2011 census (including Earle))
- OS grid reference: NT989280
- Civil parish: Wooler
- Unitary authority: Northumberland
- Ceremonial county: Northumberland
- Region: North East
- Country: England
- Sovereign state: United Kingdom
- Post town: WOOLER
- Postcode district: NE71
- Dialling code: 01668
- Police: Northumbria
- Fire: Northumberland
- Ambulance: North East
- UK Parliament: North Northumberland

Wooler (/ˈwʊlə/ WUUL-ə) is a town in Northumberland, England on the edge of the Northumberland National Park, near the Cheviot Hills. It is a popular base for walkers and is referred to as the "Gateway to the Cheviots". As well as shops and public houses, the town has a youth hostel, hotels and campsites. It lies on the St Cuthbert's Way long-distance footpath between Melrose Abbey and Lindisfarne.

The main A697 road links the town with Morpeth and Coldstream in the Scottish Borders. Wooler has two schools; Wooler First School (including Little Acorns Nursery) and Glendale Community Middle School. They share a single campus on Brewery Road providing education for children in the Glendale area from 2 years old to 13 years old.

Close by to the west is Yeavering Bell, crowned by an Iron Age fort, a stronghold of the Votadini. The remnants of many stone huts can be seen on its summit, which is surrounded by a collapsed stone wall. At the northern base of the hill is the site of Yeavering (Ad Gefrin in Bede's Ecclesiastical History of the English People), which was the summer residence of the early Anglo-Saxon kings of Northumbria.

== History ==
Wooler was not recorded in Domesday Book because in 1086 northern Northumbria was not under Norman control. By 1107, at the time of the creation of the 1st Baron Wooler, the settlement was described as "situated in an ill-cultivated country under the influence of vast mountains, from whence it is subject to impetuous rains". Wooler subsequently enjoyed a period of prosperity and with its expansion it was granted a licence in 1199 to hold a market every Thursday. St Mary Magdalene Hospital was established around 1288.

Wooler is close to Humbleton Hill, the site of a severe Scottish defeat at the hands of Harry Hotspur in 1402. The battle is referred to at the beginning of William Shakespeare's play Henry IV, Part 1 – of which Hotspur is the dashing hero.

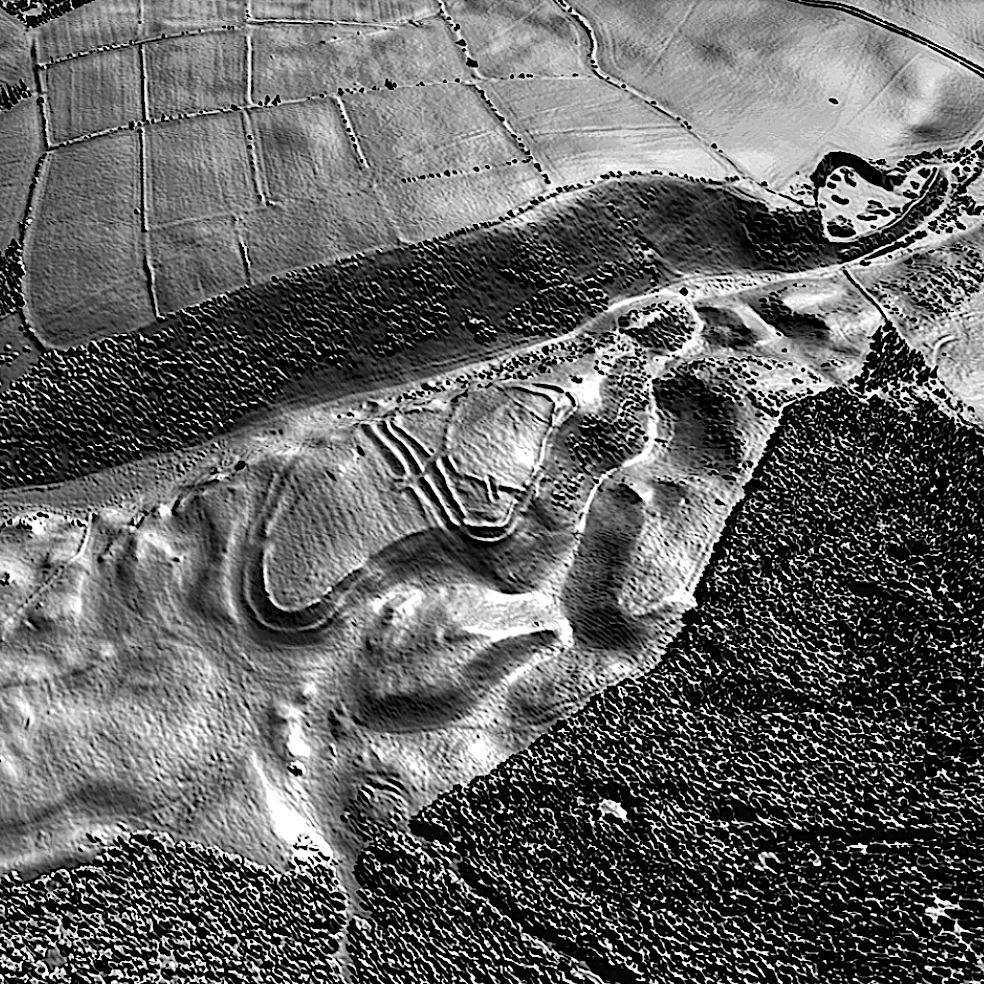
A lidar view of Wooler's nearby Iron Age and Roman settlement site, The Kettles.

After the Dissolution of the Monasteries the patronage and tithe income from the parish church passed from the Bishop of Durham to the Earl of Tankerville.

Alexander Dalziel of Wooler (1781–1832) was the father of the celebrated Dalziel Brothers. Seven of his eight children were artists and became celebrated wood-engravers in London. Their sister Margaret was also a wood-engraver.

There was once a fountain at the top of Church Street. Between 1887 and 1965 the town was served by Wooler railway station on the Alnwick to Cornhill Branch.

Wooler formerly had a drill hall, which was also used as a picture house. Children were evacuated to Wooler in World War II. During the war the area played an important role in military training, including RAF Milfield. A wartime ordnance depot on Scotts Park in Wooler led to the discovery in 2025 of 177 practice bombs buried under the children's playground in the park.

== Places of worship ==
Wooler has several places of worship including:

- St Mary's Parish Church (Anglican, 1765), Church Street, a Grade II listed building. (There has been a building on the site for over 700 years.)
- Wooler United Reformed Church (1784), Cheviot Street, a Grade II listed building. (Before the union that formed the United Reformed Church in 1972, this was Wooler Presbyterian Church.)
- St Ninian's Catholic Church (1856), Burnhouse Road, a Grade II listed building.
- Wooler Evangelical Church (Fellowship of Independent Evangelical Churches, 2003), Cheviot Street.

At one time, there was a Methodist congregation in Wooler. The old Methodist chapel on Cheviot Street is now the Glendale Hall.

== Meaning of place-name ==
Wooler may be from Old English wella ‘well, spring’ and ofer (ridge, hill). A record of the name as Welnfver in 1186 seems to suggest this origin. The well or spring referred to is the River Till. The Wooler Water, part of which is also known as Happy Valley, is a tributary of the River Till and is formed by a confluence of the Harthope and Carey Burns, which rise in the Cheviot Hills to the south of Wooler.

Another possible origin is ‘Wulfa's hillside’, from the Old English personal name Wulfa ‘wolf’ and őra ‘hillside, slope’, although this word in place-names usually means ‘river mouth, shore’. A record of the name as Wulloir in 1232 may suggest this origin.

== Governance ==
An electoral ward of the same name exists. This ward stretches from the Scottish Border south-east to Ingram and had a total population taken at the 2011 Census of 4,266.

== Media ==
Local news and television programmes are provided by BBC North East and Cumbria and ITV Tyne Tees. Television signals are received from the Chatton TV transmitter and the local relay transmitter situated south west of the town. Local radio stations are BBC Radio Newcastle, Heart North East, Capital North East, Hits Radio North East, and Lionheart Radio, a community based station which broadcast from Alnwick. The town is served by the local newspaper, Northumberland Gazette.

== Freedom of the Parish ==
The following people and military units have received the Freedom of the Parish of Wooler.

- Anthony Murray: 27 May 2021.
