= Portgate =

Fortified gateway in Hadrian's Wall, Northumberland, England

- Northumberland, England, UK
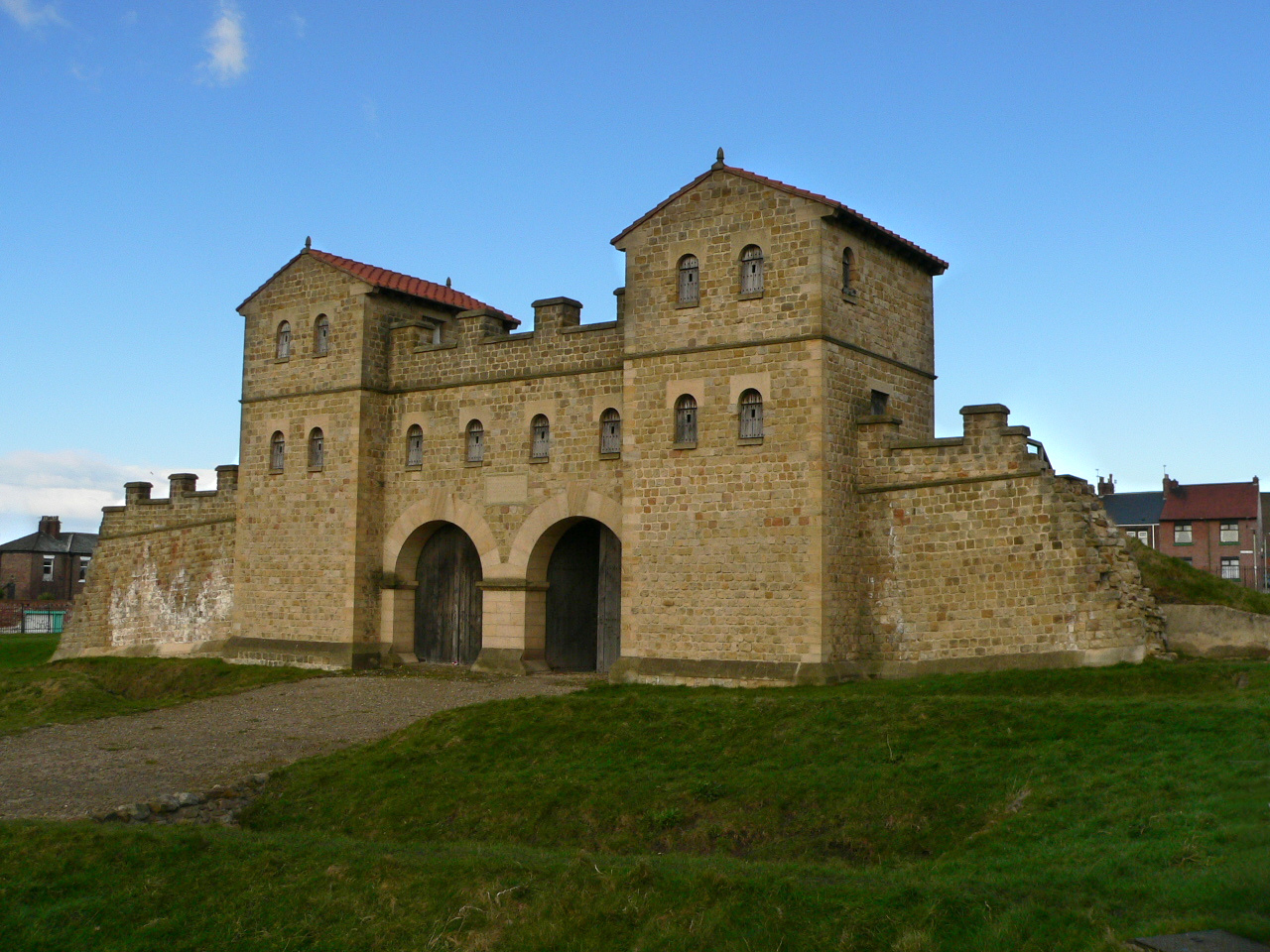
- Although the structure of the Portgate is unknown, it is likely to have resembled this reconstruction gateway at Arbeia

Location
- Location in Northumberland
- Coordinates: 55.012663°N 2.021612°W
- Grid reference: NY98736869

The Portgate was a fortified gateway, constructed as part of Hadrian's Wall where it crossed the Roman road now known as Dere Street, which preceded Hadrian's Wall by around 50 years. It was built to control traffic along Dere Street as it passed north through Hadrian's Wall. The gate's remains exist beneath the old B6318 Military Road to the south-west of the Stagshaw Roundabout (the B6318 was diverted slightly for the construction of the Stagshaw Roundabout, leaving two short sections of the existing road unlinked – the remains of the Portgate are buried beneath the western section).

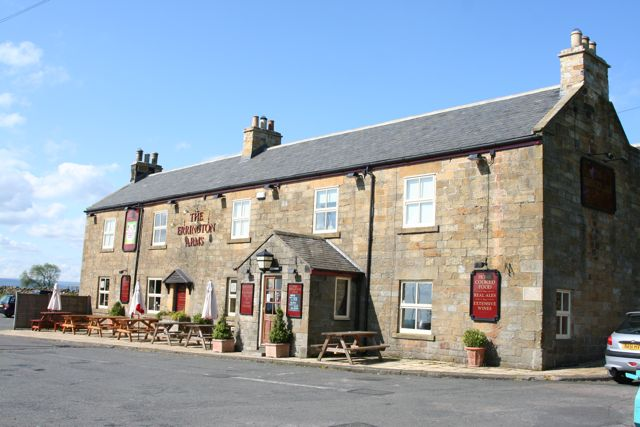
The Portgate is located just to the north of the Errington Arms pub at Stagshaw Roundabout

== Origins of the name ==
If any name was given to the structure by the Romans, it is no longer known. The name Portgate is thought to be of Anglo-Saxon origin.

== Construction ==
The Portgate was constructed from very large masonry blocks. It projected between 3.06 metres (10.0 ft) and 3.66 metres (12.0 ft) north of the wall, sitting astride the wall. It was probably a square or rectangular structure.

== Excavations and investigations ==
- 1732 - John Horsley reported visible remains of a fortification at the location, stating

There has been a square castellum, half within the wall and half without. There is a suggestion even today that the ditch of the wall turned northward round such a building.

- 1955 - English Heritage Field Investigation. It was noted that to the east of Dere Street there is a suggestion that the ditch turned north and followed the road for a short distance, however it is probable that this effect is due to contemporary drainage ditches.
- 1966 - Excavation directed by Miss D. Charlesworth exposed the west tower of the Portgate in the verge a few inches North of the kerb of the B6318.

== Civil parish ==
Portgate was a civil parish, in 1951 the parish had a population of 52. Portgate was formerly a township in St John-Lee parish; from 1866 Portgate was a civil parish in its own right until it was abolished on 1 April 1955 and merged with Corbridge.

== Monument records ==
Monument	Monument Number	English Heritage Archive Number
Portgate	181662	NY 96 NE 5

== Bibliography ==
- Daniels, Charles (1979), "Review: Fact and Theory on Hadrian's Wall", Britannia, 10: 357–364, doi:10.2307/526069, JSTOR 526069
