= RAF Milfield =

Royal Air Force station located near Milfield, Northumberland, England

RAF Milfield
- Milfield, Northumberland in England

Site information
- Type: Royal Air Force station
- Code: IL
- Owner: Air Ministry
- Operator: Royal Air Force
- Controlled by: RAF Fighter Command * No. 9 Group RAF * No. 81 (OTU) Group RAF

Location
- Shown within Northumberland
- Coordinates: 55°35′26″N 2°5′14″W

Site history
- Built: 1917 & 1942
- In use: 1917 - Unknown; August 1942 - February 1946
- Battles/wars: European theatre of World War II

Airfield information
- Elevation: 150 feet (46 m) AMSL
Runways
Direction	Length and surface
00/00	Concrete
00/00	Concrete
00/00	Concrete

Royal Air Force Milfield or more simply RAF Milfield is a former Royal Air Force station which operated during the Second World War, located near Milfield, Northumberland, England.

== History ==
The airfield opened on 26 January 1942, hosting No. 59 Operational Training Unit RAF, a fighter training unit, later joined by the Specialised Low Attack Instructors School RAF. The OTU trained ground-attack pilots for the Hawker Typhoon.

In January 1944, both units were disbanded and merged to become the Fighter Leaders School RAF. That specialised in training officers in commanding ground attack units, with a focus on the skills which would be needed to lead close support operations from front-line airfields in Europe.

No. 56 Operational Training Unit RAF operated from Milfield from January 1945 onwards, training replacement Hawker Tempest pilots for Second Tactical Air Force in Europe. That continued to operate until 14 February 1946, when it was disbanded and RAF Milfield closed.

The following units were based at RAF Milfield at some point:

- No. 77 Squadron RAF
- No. 183 Squadron RAF
- No. 184 Squadron RAF
- Day Fighter Development Wing RAF

== Post war use ==
After the RAF had departed, some of the outlying buildings at the site were converted into housing. The central airfield continued in use by the Borders Gliding Club until the mid-1970s, and was briefly used by Air Anglia for regional flights in 1977-78.

The Borders Gliding Club moved back to Milfield in 1992 by which time the remaining part of the airfield had been levelled and grassed over.

The site now contains a food-processing facility and sawmill, as well as a former sand and gravel quarry operated by Tarmac Limited.
