= Cornhill Branch =

Railway line in Northumberland, England

The Cornhill Branch was a 35.5-mile (57 km) single track branch railway line in Northumberland, England, that ran from Alnwick on the terminus of the three mile long Alnmouth to Alnwick line via ten intermediate stations to a junction on the Tweedmouth to Kelso Branch line at Cornhill-on-Tweed.

== History ==
North-eastern Railway Company's (Alnwick and Cornhill Branch) Act 1882
- Act of Parliament
- Parliament of the United Kingdom
- Long title: An Act for enabling the North-eastern Railway Company to construct a Railway from Alnwick to Cornhill in the county of Northumberland; and for other purposes.
- Citation: 45 & 46 Vict. c. xxii

Dates
- Royal assent: 19 May 1882

Text of statute as originally enacted

Authorised by the North-eastern Railway Company's (Alnwick and Cornhill Branch) Act 1882 (45 & 46 Vict. c. xxii), the Cornhill Branch was built to link the farming communities of north Northumberland with the market town of Alnwick, and link the North Eastern Railway's Kelso line to its Alnwick Branch. Construction was started by the North Eastern Railway in 1884. The line opened to freight between Cornhill and Wooperton on 2 May 1887, and the whole line for both freight and passengers on 5 September of the same year. The line had difficulty attracting passengers because many of the stations were some distance from the communities they served. Increased bus competition in the 1920s led to passenger trains being withdrawn on 22 September 1930, although the service resumed briefly during the Second World War to serve RAF Milfield, near Akeld.

After a severe storm in August 1948 washed away a bridge north of Ilderton station, British Railways, which had recently taken over the line, decided that the low volume of rail traffic did not warrant replacing the bridge. The line was thus split into two: Alnwick to Ilderton, and Coldstream to Wooler. That, coupled with an infrequent service, caused the line to go further into decline. The section from Alnwick to Ilderton closed on 2 March 1953, with the other section following suit on 29 March 1965.

- Mindrum Station: 55°35'55.26"N 2°13'52.79"W
- Kirknewton Station: 55°34'2.26"N 2° 8'38.20"W
- Akeld Station: 55°33′48″N 2°04′13″W
- Wooler Station: 55°32′59″N 2°00′42″W
- Ilderton Station: 55°30'22.31"N 1°58'14.28"W
- Wooperton Station: 55°28'29.35"N 1°55'33.56"W
- Hedgeley Station: 55°26'44.95"N 1°54'25.53"W
- Glanton Station: 55°25'34.33"N 1°52'20.35"W
- Whittingham Station: 55°24'11.22"N 1°51'37.04"W
- Edlingham Station:..........

== Inglenook Sidings ==
Inglenook Sidings, created by Alan Wright (1928 - January 2005), is a well-known model railway train shunting puzzle. It consists of a specific track layout, a set of initial conditions, a defined goal, and rules which must be obeyed while performing the shunting operations.

The puzzle is based on Kilham Sidings, on the Alnwick-Cornhill branch of the North Eastern Railway (NER).
