= Alnwick railway station =

Disused railway station in Northumberland, England

Alnwick

General information
- Location: Alnwick, Northumberland; England
- Coordinates: 55.410°N 1.699°W
- Platforms: 2

Other information
- Status: Disused

History
- Original company: North Eastern Railway
- Pre-grouping: North Eastern Railway
- Post-grouping: London and North Eastern Railway, North Eastern Region of British Railways

Key dates
- 19 August 1850: Station opens
- 5 September 1887: Station relocated
- 29 January 1968: Passenger service withdrawn
- 7 October 1968: Freight service withdrawn
Location

Alnwick railway station served the town of Alnwick, in Northumberland, England. It was the terminus of two routes: the Alnwick branch line, which diverged from the East Coast Main Line at Alnmouth, and the Cornhill branch line to Coldstream.

== History ==
The first station on the edge of the town opened, along with the branch, on 19 August 1850; it was first used by a special train on 6 August.

It was replaced by a station nearer the town centre, which was opened in 1887 by the North Eastern Railway. It became part of the London and North Eastern Railway during the Grouping of 1923. The station then passed on to the North Eastern Region of British Railways on nationalisation in 1948.

The station was also the terminus of the Cornhill branch line to Coldstream, which closed to passengers on 22 September 1930.

It was closed to passengers by the British Railways Board in January 1968 and completely in October 1968. After the station's closure, the building was used as a storage facility until 1991, when it was purchased by its present owners.

In 1993, a proposal to redevelop the site into a supermarket failed.

Preceding station	Disused railways	Following station
Terminus	North Eastern Railway; Alnwick branch line	Alnmouth; Line closed; station open
Edlingham; Line and station closed	North Eastern Railway; Cornhill branch line	Terminus

== Present use ==
Inside the modern-day bookshop

The trainshed remains intact; the platforms have been in-filled.

In 1991, the station was purchased by an American-British couple, Stuart and Mary Manley, who turned the trainshed into a second-hand bookshop named Barter Books. It is now the UK's largest second-hand bookshop, with a stock of over 350,000 titles (as of October 2026). It was here that the motivational World War II poster Keep Calm and Carry On was rediscovered in 2020.

The bookshop, with its model railway network, was featured in Michael Portillo's Great British Railway Journeys (first broadcast on BBC2, 23 January 2012) and Tim Dunn's The Architecture the Railways Built (first broadcast on Yesterday, 25 October 2021).
