= Jedburgh Railway =

Former railway line in Scotland

The Jedburgh Railway was a 9 1/2-mile (15 km) single-track branch railway in the Borders, Scotland, built by the Jedburgh Railway Company. It ran from a point south of Roxburgh Junction on the Kelso Line to Jedburgh via three intermediate stations, Kirkbank, Nisbet and Jedfoot.

== History ==
Jedburgh Railway Act 1855
- Act of Parliament
- Parliament of the United Kingdom
- Long title: An Act for making a Railway from the Town of Jedburgh to the Kelso Branch of the North British Railway at or near the Roxburgh Station, and for other Purposes.
- Citation: 18 & 19 Vict. c. xxx

Dates
- Royal assent: 25 May 1855

Other legislation
- Repealed by: North British and Jedburgh Railways Amalgamation Act 1860

Text of statute as originally enacted

North British and Jedburgh Railways Amalgamation Act 1860
- Act of Parliament
- Parliament of the United Kingdom
- Long title: An Act to amalgamate the Jedburgh Railway Company with the North British Railway Company, and for other Purposes.
- Citation: 23 & 24 Vict. c. cxl

Dates
- Royal assent: 3 July 1860

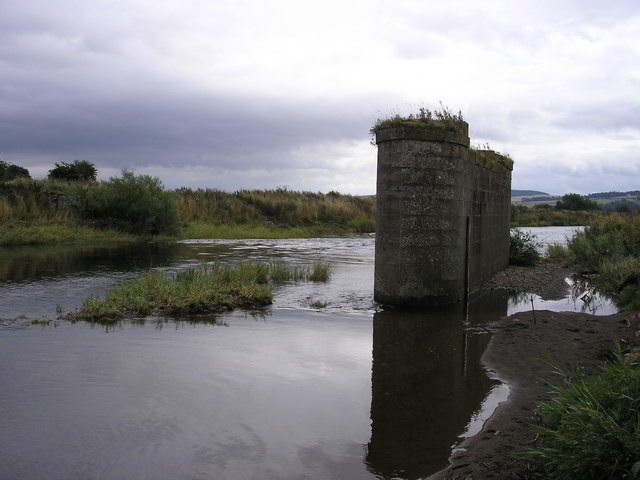
Remains of the bridge across the River Teviot

Authorised by the Jedburgh Railway Act 1855 (18 & 19 Vict. c. xxx), the line was opened in July of the next year. It was run by the North British Railway from its opening and was absorbed by that company by the North British and Jedburgh Railways Amalgamation Act 1860 (23 & 24 Vict. c. cxl). The line closed to passengers on 13 August 1948, the day after large-scale flooding took out the bridge over the Teviot at Nisbet. The line closed to freight on 10 August 1964.

The track where the rails lay is now part of the Borders Abbeys Way walking route.

== See also ==
The Kelso and Jedburgh railway branch lines
