= Kelso and Jedburgh railway branch lines =

Former railway lines in Scotland

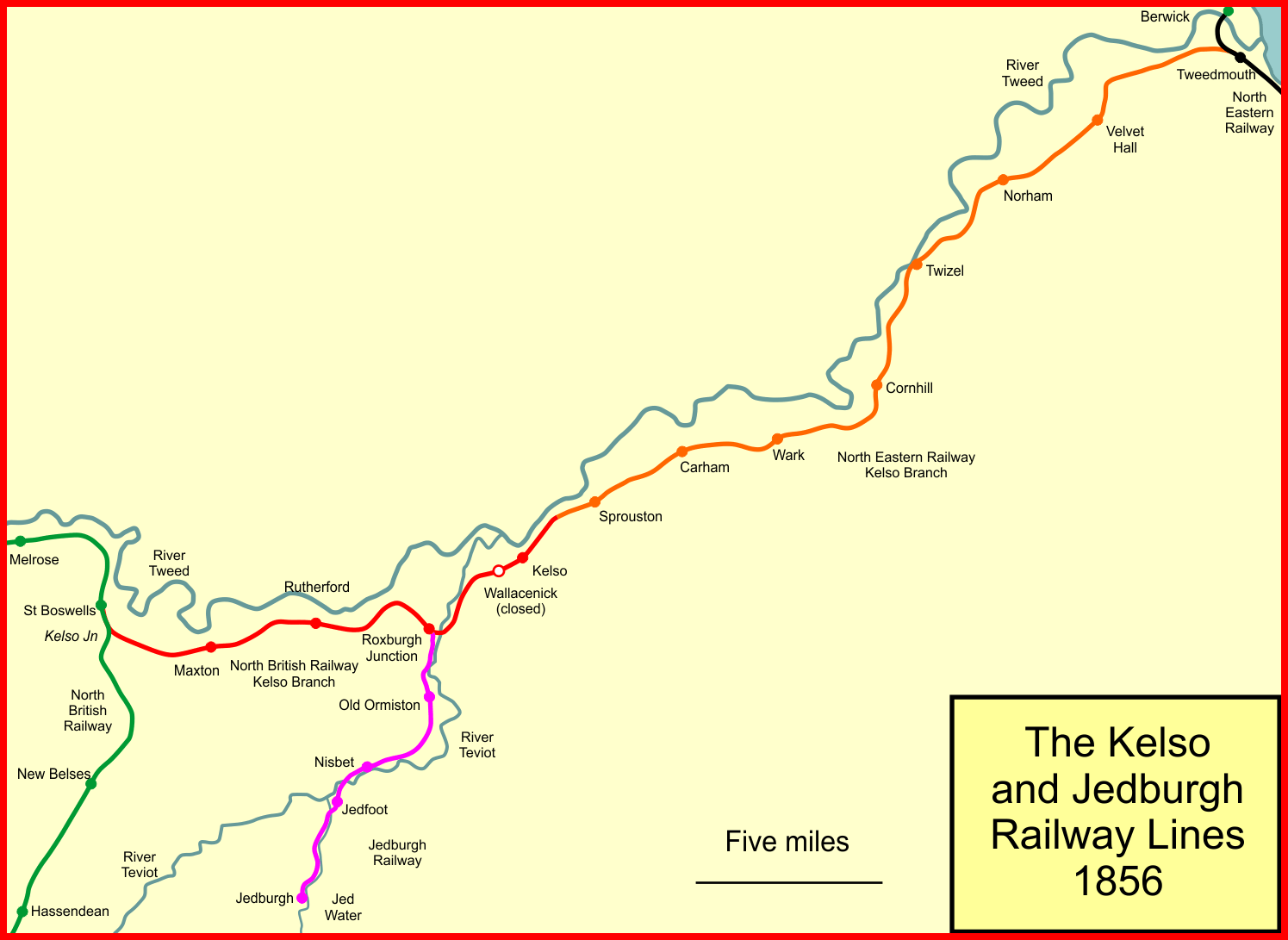
The Kelso and Jedburgh lines in 1856

The Railway of Kelso and Jedburgh branch lines was a 'network' of three distinct railway services serving Kelso in the Scottish Borders.

The first of these was a branch of the Newcastle and Berwick Railway, departing from a junction at Tweedmouth, near Berwick-upon-Tweed, and initially terminating at Sprouston, two miles west of Kelso. This was opened in 1849.

The second line, opened in 1850, was a branch of the North British Railway which departed from the line for Hawick at St Boswells and initially terminated at a second temporary station just outside Kelso. After another year, in 1851, the gap between the two Kelso stations was closed and a permanent station at Kelso opened. The two companies, however, operated under competing managements and failed to develop a through service over the line.

Around five years later, in 1856, a further independent company, the Jedburgh Railway, opened its connection for Jedburgh. This branch departed from the Kelso line at the Roxburgh junction, around four miles to the south-west of Kelso.

Although woollen manufacture and shoe-making were important local industries, Kelso's economy was largely agricultural. From the 1930s onwards, transport policies increasingly pushed for road transportation over rail and, by the mid-twentieth century, goods and passenger carryings on the lines were being reduced. The Jedburgh line passenger service was closed in 1948. Passenger services on the other lines were heavily reduced in 1955 and withdrawn in 1964.

== History ==
=== Background ===
Kelso's industry was a little different to that of the other famous woollen towns of the borders; a writer in 1825 said:

Kelso, though not entitled to rank among the commercial towns of Scotland, has nevertheless a considerable trade... The first and principal branch is the dressing of lamb and sheep skins, the tanning of hides and the currying of leather, all which are carried on to a vast extent ... Pork is here cured to a great extent, which finds a ready sale in the English market. The manufacture of flannel is pretty extensive, as is also that of different kinds of linen. Woollen cloth is likewise made here but not in any great quantity... Boot and shoe-making is carried on upon a very large scale... disposing of immense quantities at the different fairs and markets in the north of England.

Jedburgh, with a population of 5,251 in 1821, was predominantly engaged in agriculture, although the manufacture of blankets and carpets was also significant, as well as there being an iron foundry and a manufacturer of printing presses.

The location of the towns, remote from navigable water, made transport of products and raw materials difficult.

=== First railway authorisation ===
Berwick and Kelso Railway and Bridge over Tweed Act 1811
- Act of Parliament
- Parliament of the United Kingdom
- Long title: An Act for making and maintaining a Railway from or near Spittal, in the County of Durham, to Kelso, in the County of Roxburgh; and for erecting and maintaining a Bridge over the River Tweed from the Parish of Norham, in the County of Durham, to the Parish of Coldstream, in the County of Berwick.
- Citation: 51 Geo. 3. c. cxxxiii

Dates
- Royal assent: 31 May 1811

Text of statute as originally enacted

A railway connecting Kelso in Roxburghshire with Berwick-upon-Tweed, thereby providing the Scottish Borders with access to the North Sea and coastal shipping, was first seriously proposed in 1809. Authorisation for the projected Berwick and Kelso Railway was obtained in an act of Parliament, the Berwick and Kelso Railway and Bridge over Tweed Act 1811 (51 Geo. 3. c. cxxxiii), on 31 May 1811, the first 'Northumbrian' line to obtain an authorising act of Parliament, and the first anywhere to refer to the conveyance of passengers in its act. The intended terminus was to be Spittal, near Tweedmouth, which at that time was part of an enclave under the jurisdiction of County Durham. These early plans did not ultimately proceed and were formally abandoned in 1827. Local promoters again attempted to revive the scheme in 1836, with updated estimates for construction amounting to £100,000 for a 22 mile line. This too came to nothing, and the Berwick and Kelso Railway Company was dissolved in January 1838.

=== Main line railways ===
The Edinburgh and Glasgow Railway opened its main line in 1842, showing that a general railway could be successful, where in the past practically all railways had been involved with bringing coal or another mineral from its source. At the same time as the E&GR was being built, the English network seemed to be taking shape, and it was considered urgently necessary to determine the route that a line from central Scotland to England might take. For some time it was assumed that only a single railway route could be commercially viable, and great consideration was given to the route it might take. This was particularly significant because of the barrier of the Southern Uplands and the Cheviot Hills, both considered passable only with great difficulty.

A route put forward by G Remington was proposed to run from Edinburgh through Lauder, Kelso, Wooler and Morpeth to Newcastle; the line was to use the Edinburgh and Dalkeith Railway, a horse-drawn line using stone block sleepers, for access to Edinburgh. A Government commission, the so-called Smith-Barlow Commission, examined this and numerous other routes, but Remington had not prepared estimates of cost for his line; it was said to require works of a most formidable character, and would cost so much that it could not conceivably pay. His scheme fell by the wayside.

In fact the first main line between central Scotland and England was the North British Railway route, running from Edinburgh through Dunbar to Berwick, where it met the Newcastle and Berwick Railway. At first the line was not carried over the River Tweed and through passengers had to walk, or be conveyed by coach, across the road bridge.

While the North British Railway was building its main line, the Newcastle and Berwick Railway, authorised by the Newcastle and Berwick Railway Act 1845 (8 & 9 Vict. c. clxiii) of 13 July 1845, with capital of £1,400,000, was building its line. Its prime objective was to further the chain of railways that was to form the East Coast route from London to Scotland; its main line was to be 65 miles in length, but there were to be several branches, for which powers were obtained in 1846, including a branch from Tweedmouth to Kelso. The Newcastle and Berwick Railway merged with the York and Newcastle Railway, becoming the York, Newcastle and Berwick Railway on 9 August 1847.

The Newcastle and Berwick Railway completed its line between Tweedmouth and Newcastle on 1 July 1847.

=== Tweedmouth to Sprouston ===
Construction of the branch from Tweedmouth to Sprouston followed, and it opened as a double track on 27 July 1849. Goods train operation seems to have started earlier.

The line followed the southern bank of the River Tweed as far as Sprouston. It had been intended to reach Kelso, another two miles, but hostility from the Duke of Roxburghe prevented this for the time being, so Sprouston became the station for Kelso.

The Berwick and Kelso Railway: This railway, a branch of the York, Newcastle and Berwick line was on Monday last (23 July 1849) examined by Capt. Wynne, the Inspector-General of Railways... The whole length of the line is 20¼ miles from Tweedmouth to the village of Sprouston, which is the Kelso terminus of the railway, though at a distance of between two and three miles from the town of Kelso. There are stations at Velvet Hall, Norham, Cornhill, Carham and Sprouston, from whence omnibuses are to run to Kelso in connection with each train... Goods trains have for several weeks been running between Tweedmouth and Sprouston, but the line is to be opened tomorrow [27 July 1849].

At this stage the Royal Border Bridge crossing the River Tweed and connecting Berwick and Tweedmouth had not yet opened; it did so on 29 July 1850, to goods trains only at first. The junction at Tweedmouth faced the south, so that through trains from Berwick had to reverse there. Sprouston was regarded as a permanent terminus, and all facilities including an engine shed and turntable were provided there.

The initial train service was three trains daily each way, two on Sunday.

The Y&NBR stations at Carham and Sprouston and 3½ miles of track in their vicinity "were the only conquests ever made by an English company on Scottish soil".

=== St Boswells to Kelso ===
By the end of 1844, with their main line not yet open, the North British Railway were planning a branch line to Carlisle. This prodigious scheme was portrayed at first as simply a branch from near Edinburgh to Hawick, in itself a huge project, and a branch to Kelso was being discussed. The plans took shape and at a shareholders' meeting on 9 February 1846 a large collection of branches were approved, including a group from the Hawick line to Kelso, Jedburgh, Selkirk and Peebles, with share capital of £770,000. The North British Railway (Hawick Branch) Act 1846 (9 & 10 Vict. c. lxxiii) was secured on 26 June 1846. Tenders were accepted in early 1847.

The Kelso branch route was 12½ miles long from Kelso Junction at St Boswells; it ran for eight miles down the Tweed Valley before crossing the River Teviot on a high stone arch viaduct (Roxburgh Viaduct).

The line from St Boswells to Kelso opened on 17 June 1850, (Note: Ross, pages 34 and 239, says 7 June 1850, but this seems to be a mistake.) but at first this was only to a temporary station at Wallace Nick (often spelt Wallacenick), about a mile west of Kelso. This too was due to the objections of the Duke of Roxburghe.

=== Closing the gap ===
Two railways had tried to reach Kelso but were obliged to stop short: the York, Newcastle and Berwick Railway (Note: The York, Newcastle and Berwick Railway was the successor to the Newcastle and Berwick Railway, since a merger on 9 August 1847. In 1854 a further merger made the YN&BR part of the North Eastern Railway.) branch from Tweedmouth at Sprouston, and the North British Railway branch from St Boswells at Wallace Nick.

An accommodation with the Duke of Roxburghe seems to have been made, and the two railways worked together to close the gap. In fact they met half way, by an end-on junction at Mellendean Farm, east of Kelso. There was no station or other facility there. The North British built the new Kelso station, but this was in a district of Kelso called Maxwellheugh, inconveniently located south of the River Tweed. The new railway opened between Wallace Nick and Sprouston on 1 June 1851, and Wallace Nick station closed. (Note: 1 June 1851 seems to be the consensus. Dissenters are Thomas (volume 1 page 239): Wallacenick to Maxwellheugh 1 January 1851; Ross (page 239): Wallacenick to Maxwellheugh 7 January 1851; Darsley and Lovett (caption to picture 59): the North Eastern (sic) "did not reach the town until 27th January 1851"; also (caption to map XVIII) Wallacenick to Sprouston opened 27 July 1851; Lewin (page 522): NBR to Maxwellheugh 27 January 1851; Maxwellheugh to Sprouston NBR and YN&BR 1 June 1851; and Quick (page 168), quoting Grevill: 27 January 1851.)

In building a portion of line beyond Kelso, the North British Railway clearly had expectations of running through to Berwick. The YN&BR trains used the NBR Kelso station. For a short time in 1854 a through passenger service was operated, but relations between the NBR and the North Eastern Railway (successor to the YN&BR) became strained over negotiations for through running between Berwick and Edinburgh, and from the Border Counties Railway to Newcastle upon Tyne, and as a result of the antagonism the service at Kelso was stopped from running through. Punctuality leaving Tweedmouth was heavily dependent on the timekeeping of main line trains from the south, and for local passengers from Kelso westward this made the service hopelessly unreliable. By 1859 through tickets were not available; passengers had to rebook at Kelso., and in fact the timetables were not co-ordinated to give useful connections there. Many references use the term Maxwellheugh for Kelso station.

=== Jedburgh branch ===
Construction of the Jedburgh branch was authorised in the North British Railway Act 1846 (9 & 10 Vict. c. lxxiv) of 26 June 1846, along with the Kelso line and other branches. However the Jedburgh line was not proceeded with, and an independent company, the Jedburgh Railway Company obtained its own authorising act of Parliament, the Jedburgh Railway Act 1855 (18 & 19 Vict. c. xxx), on 25 July 1855; capital was £35,000. It opened its line on 17 July 1856, and the line was worked by the North British Railway. The Jedburgh Railway Company was absorbed by the North British Railway by the North British and Jedburgh Railways Amalgamation Act 1860 (23 & 24 Vict. c. cxl) of 3 July 1860, effective from 31 July 1860, and from that time the line was simply a branch of the North British.

The line was seven miles long, and kept to the west bank of the River Teviot as far as Nisbet; it then crossed to the south bank following the Jed Water into Jedburgh. Stations were (at first) Old Ormiston, Nisbet, Jedfoot and Jedburgh. Jedburgh station had an overall roof, but the location of the station at ¾ mile from the market place was awkward, and an omnibus connection was operated for some years.

Passenger trains generally ran to Kelso, reversing at Roxburgh.

=== Alnwick branch ===
In 1887 the North Eastern Railway built a branch line from Alnwick to Coldstream, on the Kelso line; it opened on 5 September 1887. It was never heavily used, and the Alnwick line closed to passengers in September 1930, but goods trains continued to serve Wooler until 29 July 1965.

=== Train service in 1895 ===
The passenger train service in 1895 consisted of five trains each way on weekdays between Berwick and Kelso, with an additional short working from Berwick to Coldstream, in connection with the Alnwick branch there. There were two trains each way throughout on Sundays. On the Kelso to St Boswells and Jedburgh section there were five trains each way weekdays, two on Sundays, making connections at Roxburgh for the Jedburgh line which had a similar service, running from Kelso to Jedburgh. There seems to have been no attempt to arrange good connections at Kelso.

== The twentieth century ==
=== Shunting at Kelso ===
There was a celebrated horse at Kelso in the early years of the twentieth century, employed in shunting. The curves in the yard were exceptionally severe and a steam locomotive was unable to negotiate them. However in 1921 the North British acquired a petrol shunting locomotive of extremely short wheelbase, such that the driver sat athwart the vehicle. This replaced the horse shunting and reduced the annual cost from £1,180 to £904, although the company spent £121 on easing the curves in addition.

Darsley and Lovett have it arriving a little later: Petrol engine no 1 arrived at Kelso in September 1923; it cost £1,200. It was sent to Cowlairs works and fitted with a much larger cab, and returned to Kelso in December 1927. The LNER classified it as class Z6 no 8431. In July 1930 it was transferred to Ware, on the Great Eastern section. It was the North British Railway's only non-steam motive power.

A Sentinel shunting locomotive class Y1 no 7134 was based at Kelso from 1928 to 1955; it was the only Sentinel locomotive in Scotland. After 1955 it was moved to Ayr, where it worked until 1959.

=== 1920 traffic ===
The year 1920 was a peak year for the towns in the area; the Jedburgh branch in particular took £21,126 in the year, and Kirkbank station dispatched 11,748 head of cattle.

The passenger train service had declined, however, with three trains plus two short workings between Berwick and Kelso weekdays, two on Sundays; and six westbound, five eastbound on the Kelso to St Boswells section; one eastbound train is noted as through to Berwick. The Jedburgh line had six trains each way weekdays, not so carefully arranged to connect from Jedburgh to St Boswells at Roxburgh. There was no Sunday service west of Kelso.

=== Grouping of the railways ===
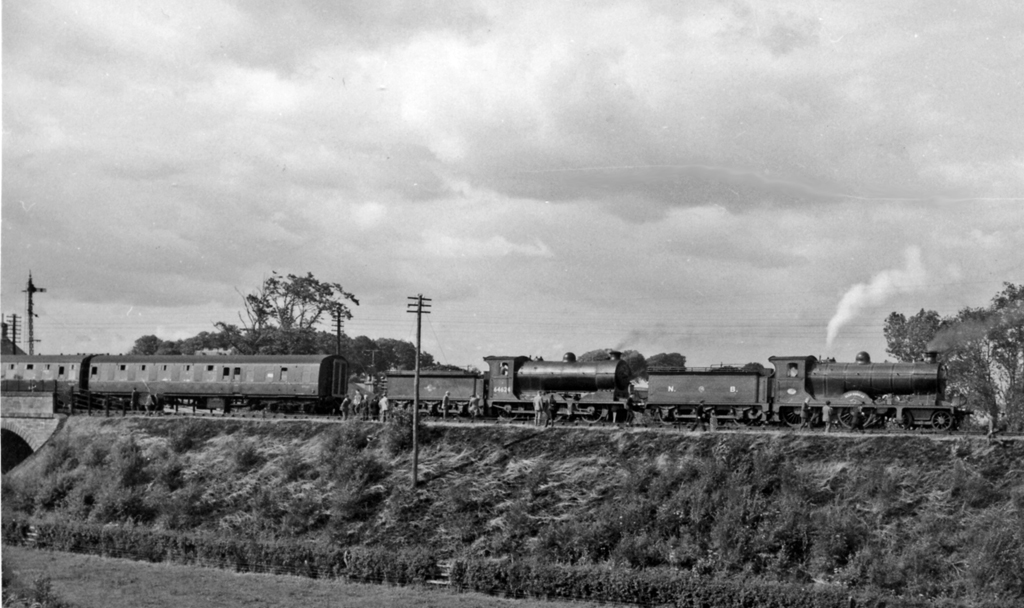
A rail tour on the line in the Roxburgh area in 1961.

In 1923 the railways of Great Britain were "grouped" under the Railways Act 1921. Both the North Eastern Railway and the North British Railway were constituents of the new London and North Eastern Railway (LNER). The combined management of the railways west and east of Kelso did not result in any improved co-ordination of the passenger services through the town.

=== Singling ===
In 1933 the St Boswells (Kelso Junction) to Kelso section was reduced from double track to single: Kelso Junction to Roxburgh Junction was singled on 5 November whilst Roxburgh Junction to Kelso was singled on 10 December.

After closure to freight traffic from Tweedmouth to Kelso in 1965 by NERegion/ScRegion, only one track of this double track section was removed, and, for a few years, a single, but out-of-use line remained between Kelso and Tweedmouth.

After withdrawal of the ScRegion freight service to Kelso (now utilising a 350hp 0-6-0 shunter based at Galashiels) in 1968, lifting of the complete branch started at the Kelso Junction in 1969, the contractors working eastwards to Tweedmouth.

=== 1938 train service ===
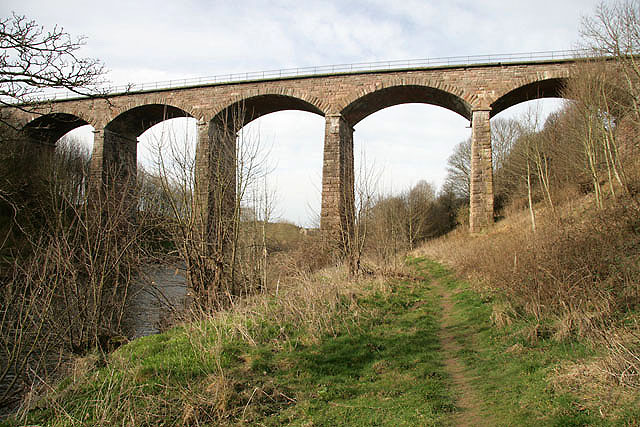
Twizel Viaduct

In 1938 the passenger train service was under unified command under the LNER, but there was still limited evidence of co-ordination of the two lines at Kelso. The Berwick line had four trains plus a short working to Coldstream on weekdays, with an additional Saturday train. The St Boswells line had seven daily trains with two extra Saturday trains; several had through carriages to or from Edinburgh via St Boswells and one ran through to and from Berwick. None of the other connections at Kelso were practical.

However there was a Sunday through train from Newcastle to Edinburgh via Tweedmouth, Kelso and St Boswells, with a buffet car. It left Newcastle at 10:30 a.m. and called at Morpeth, Alnmouth, Tweedmouth 11:58 - 12:05, Norham, Coldstream, Kelso 12:39, St Boswells 1:04 to 1:09 p.m., Melrose, Galashiels, Portobello, and arrived at Edinburgh at 2:15 p.m. The return journey left Edinburgh at 5:45 p.m., Portobello, Galashiels, Melrose, St Boswells 6:58, Kelso 7:20, Coldstream, Norham, Tweedmouth 8:00 to 8.07, Alnmouth, Morpeth and arrived at Newcastle 8:57. This service ran from 1933 to 1939.

The Jedburgh branch had 6 trains each way on weekdays, with two additional trains on Saturdays.

== Nationalisation ==
In 1948 the main line railways of Great Britain were nationalised, and the lines in the area came under the control of British Railways (BR). The BR Scottish Region controlled the lines from Carham westward, and the BR North Eastern Region the lines eastward from Carham boundary marker.

=== 1948 floods ===
During the autumn of 1948, the Borders area and the east coast of Berwickshire experienced exceptional rainfall, which reached a peak on 12 August 1948. This resulted in the breaching of the main line between Berwick and Dunbar in several places, as well as the Jedburgh branch. The Jedburgh branch service was suspended temporarily on 13 August, and for some time, through main line passenger and goods trains were diverted over the Kelso line, from Tweedmouth to St Boswells, and then over the Waverley Route to Edinburgh. The decision was made not to resume the Jedburgh line passenger service, partly due to the increased movement of trains between Roxburgh and Kelso, a section of track that most of the branch trains also used.

=== Line closures ===
Although the Jedburgh branch passenger service never recommenced, goods services were reinstated. They were discontinued from 10 August 1964. For many years after the closure to passengers, there was an annual Church excursion from Jedburgh to Spittal Beach at Tweedmouth. A thousand passengers were the norm on these trains, which continued until June 1964.

The Tweedmouth to St Boswells passenger service was threatened with closure in 1955, but the train service was cut considerably instead:

Five stations to be closed on Tweedmouth - St Boswellls Line. British Railways estimate that they will save £7,744 in a year as a result of economies which are to be introduced on the Berwick to St Boswells Branch line. Five stations—Velvet Hall, Twizell, Sunilaws, Sprouston and Carham are to be closed, and the number of trains each day will be slashed by half ... The British Railways authorities had considered the withdrawal of all trains running between St Boswells and Berwick ... but because of the heavy parcels traffic, consisting mainly of fresh meat, game and poultry, it was decided not to enforce a complete closure ...

It was reported that revenue from Sunilaws in a year amounted to £217, Twizell £66, and Velvet Hall £125, and the number of passengers travelling daily in an October census were four, six and two respectively.

The forecast of a reduced service was correct:

Border Railway line cuts begin on July 4: July 4 [1955] is the date fixed for the reduced rail services on the St Boswells - Tweedmouth branch line. From that date only two trains will run in each direction per day, instead of four each day as at present ... The cut in the number of trains has been enforced as an economy measure ... As a result the stations of Twizell, Sunnilaws, Velvet Hall, Sprouston and Carham will be closed to passengers, and the trains will stop only at Kelso, Coldstream, Norham and Tweedmouth.

The stations between Kelso and St Boswells were not affected at that stage, but the skeleton service continued to lose money. In the final years of passenger operation, trains consisted of a BR Standard 2MT locomotive (from Hawick shed) and a single brake composite coach. Passenger loadings were desperately thin and often the crew of 3 (driver, fireman and guard) would outnumber the passengers. The line between St Boswells and Tweedmouth closed to passengers on 15 June 1964, and to all trains on 1 April 1968.

== Railway replacement ==
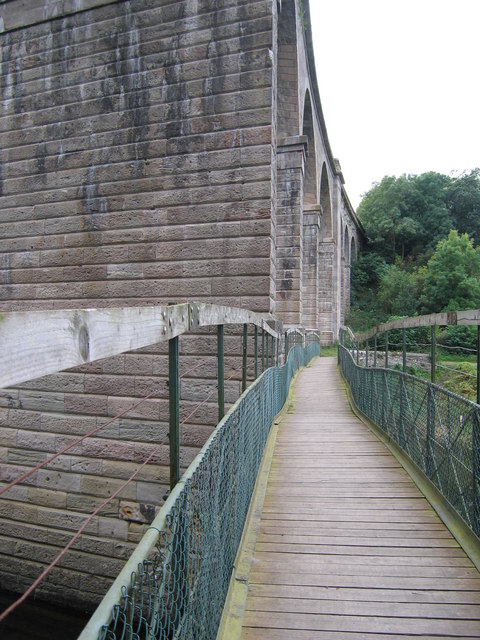
Footbridge below Roxburgh Viaduct

In 1998–1999 the footbridge attached to the Roxburgh Viaduct was being repaired. By then it had become the responsibility of the British Railway Board Residuary Body, responsible for former British Railways liabilities that had not been disposed of. The viaduct was legitimately used as a footpath, but it had to be closed during the works, and the alternative walking route for schoolchildren in Heiton attending Roxburgh school was unreasonably long and circuitous. The BRB residuary body arranged a replacement school bus during the work.

== Topography ==
=== Tweedmouth to Kelso ===
Built as double track. The line opened from Tweedmouth to Sprouston on 27 July 1849 and closed to passengers on 15 June 1964.

Stations were at:

- Tweedmouth; trains for Kelso left northwards;
- Velvet Hall; closed 4 July 1955;
- Norham;
- Twizel; opened November 1861; closed 4 July 1955;
- Cornhill; renamed Coldstream 1 October 1873;
- Wark; renamed Sunilaws 1 October 1871; closed 4 July 1955;
- Carham; open 27 July 1849; closed 4 July 1955;
- Sprouston; opened 27 July 1849; closed 4 July 1955; originally terminus; closed 4 July 1955;
- Kelso; opened 27 January 1851.

Carham village was in England but the station was in Scotland; Carham and Sprouston are the only Scottish railway stations belonging to an English railway company.

Gradients: from the zero mile post at Tweedmouth the line undulated then climbing at 1 in 140 for much of the way to Velvet Hall; further undulations followed, though generally falling as far as Twizell then climbing at 1 in 167 towards Coldstream. From there a three mile climb at 1 in 330 followed to past Sunilaws, with further undulations ending with a 1 in 72 climb into Kelso station.

=== Kelso to St Boswells ===
Built as double track; opened from Wallace Nick to Kelso Junction on 17 June 1850; closed to passengers on 15 June 1964. The line was singled in stages in 1933.

- Kelso; above;
- Wallace Nick; opened as temporary terminus 17 June 1850; closed on extension to permanent Kelso station 27 January 1851;
- Roxburgh; sometimes known as Roxburgh Junction during currency of the Jedburgh branch;
- Rutherford;
- Maxton;
- Charlsfield Depot; not a station but a loop and siding connection near Merwick cottage; the depot was an Ordnance Depot; it opened in 1942 and closed in 1945; it was then a Royal Naval Armaments Depot in 1949, but finally closed in 1961;
- Kelso Junction; convergence with Hawick line;
- New Town St Boswells; station on Hawick line; later renamed St Boswells.

Gradients: from the zero milepost at Kelso Junction, the line fell at 1 in 100 to Maxton, rising gently to Rutherford and then descending again at a ruling gradient of 1 in 100 to Roxburgh; from there it climbed at 1 in 135 for 1½ miles before descending at 1 in 72 to Kelso station.

=== Jedburgh branch ===
The line was opened on 17 July 1856, and closed to ordinary passenger trains on 13 August 1948. It was a single line.

- Roxburgh Junction; above;
- Old Ormiston; renamed Kirkbank 20 May 1868; closed 13 August 1948;
- Nisbet;
- Jedfoot Bridge; early renamed Jedfoot;
- Jedburgh.

The line fell with gradients at 1 in 110 and level sections to beyond the 2 milepost (zero was at Roxburgh Junction); there was then a mile of level and further falls to beyond Nisbet, where the line climbed again from the 5 milepost to Jedburgh at a ruling gradient of 1 in 147.

== See also ==
- http://spellerweb.net/rhindex/UKRH/NorthBritish/BosKel.html John Speller's page on the NBR branch
