= Maxton railway station =

Disused railway station in Maxton, Roxburghshire

Maxton
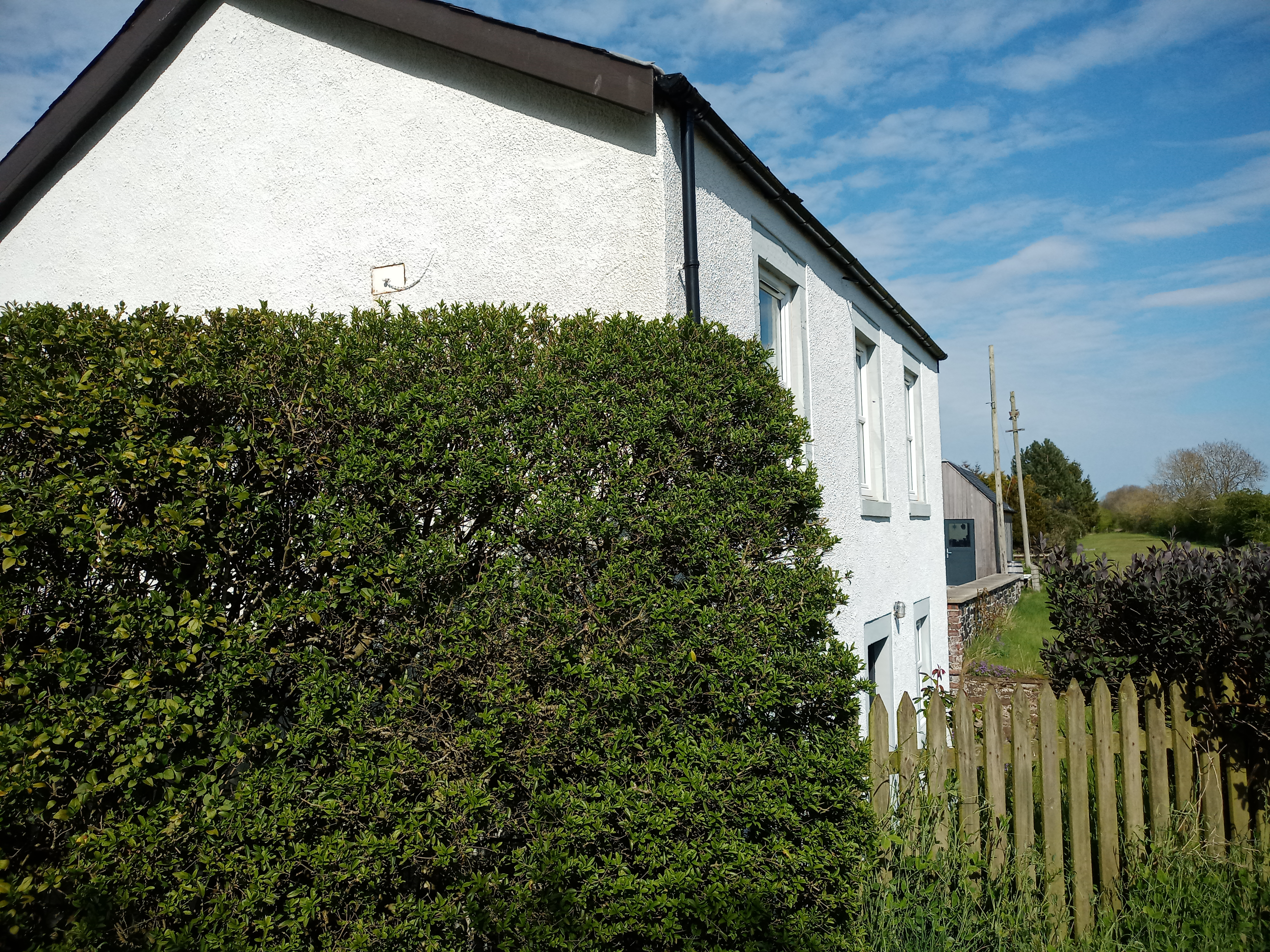
- The site of the station in 2022

General information
- Location: Maxton, Roxburghshire; Scotland
- Coordinates: 55.5619°N 2.6091°W
- Grid reference: NT616299
- Platforms: 2

Other information
- Status: Disused

History
- Original company: North British Railway
- Pre-grouping: North British Railway
- Post-grouping: LNER British Rail (Scottish Region)

Key dates
- June 1851: Opened
- 15 June 1964: Closed

Maxton railway station served the hamlet of Maxton, Roxburghshire, Scotland from 1851 to 1964 on the Kelso Line.

== History ==
The station opened in June 1851 by the North British Railway. It was closed to both passengers and goods traffic on 15 June 1964.

Preceding station	Disused railways	Following station
St. Boswells; Line and station closed	North British Railway; Kelso Line	Rutherford; Line and station closed
