= Rutherford railway station =

Disused railway station in Maxton, Roxburghshire

Rutherford

General information
- Location: Maxton, Roxburghshire; Scotland
- Coordinates: 55.5701°N 2.5486°W
- Grid reference: NT655308
- Platforms: 2

Other information
- Status: Disused

History
- Original company: North British Railway
- Pre-grouping: North British Railway
- Post-grouping: LNER; British Rail (Scottish Region)

Key dates
- June 1851: Opened
- 15 June 1964: Closed

Rutherford railway station served the parish of Maxton, Roxburghshire, Scotland from 1851 to 1964 on the Kelso Line.

== History ==
The station opened in June 1851 by the North British Railway. It closed to both passengers and goods traffic on 15 June 1964.

Preceding station	Historical railways	Following station
Maxton; Line and station closed	North British Railway; Kelso Line	Roxburgh; Line and station closed
