= Jedfoot railway station =

Disused railway station in Jedburgh, Scottish Borders

Jedfoot
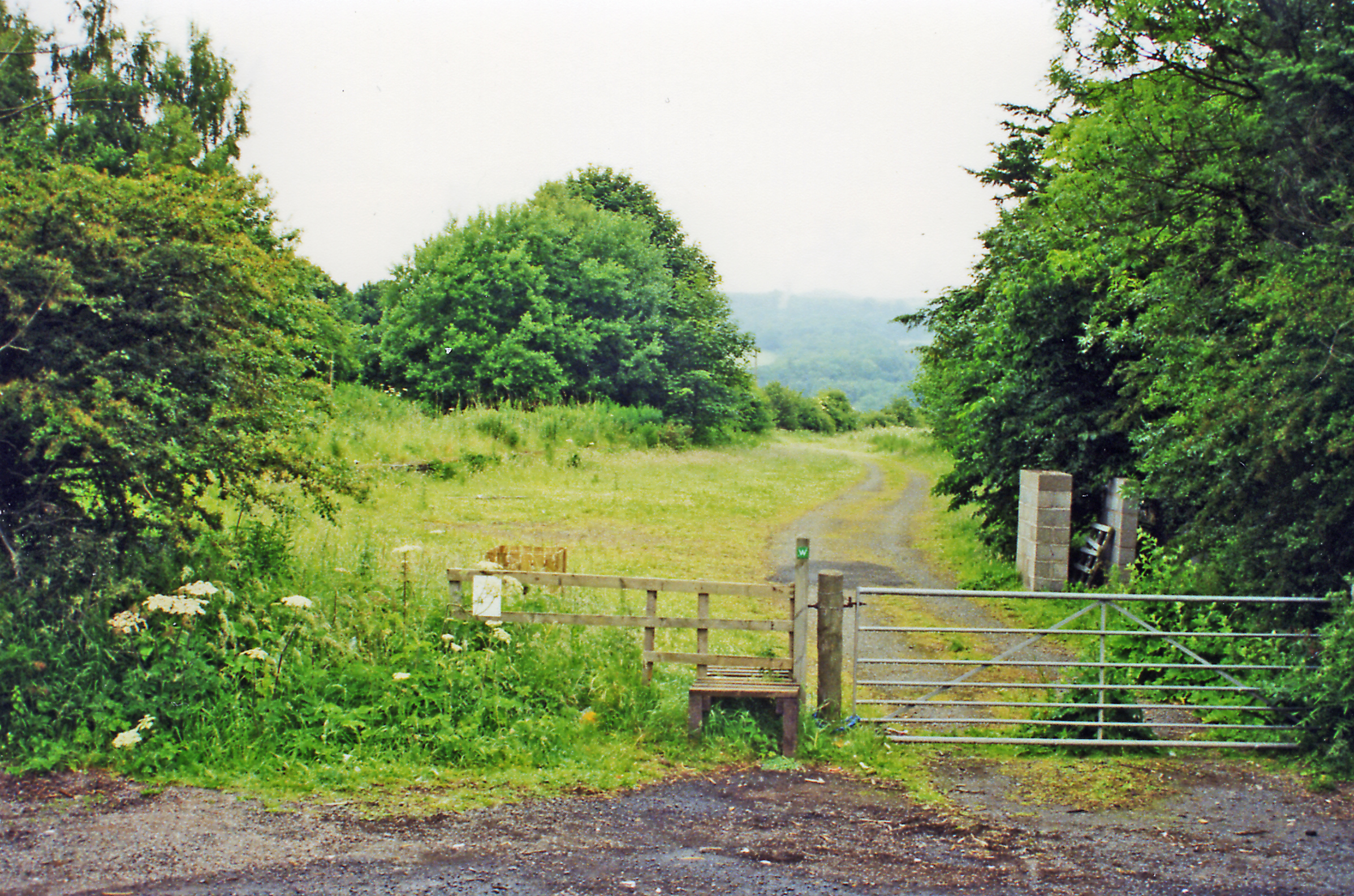
- The site of the station, looking north towards Roxburgh, in 2000

General information
- Location: Jedburgh, Scottish Borders; Scotland
- Coordinates: 55.5095°N 2.5383°W
- Grid reference: NT661241
- Platforms: 1

Other information
- Status: Disused

History
- Original company: Jedburgh Railway Company
- Pre-grouping: North British Railway
- Post-grouping: LNER; British Railways (Scottish Region)

Key dates
- 17 July 1856: Opened as Jedfoot Bridge
- 1913: Name changed to Jedfoot
- 13 August 1948: Closed
Location

Jedfoot railway station served the town of Jedburgh, Scottish Borders, Scotland from 1856 to 1948 on the Jedburgh Railway.

== History ==
The station opened as Jedfoot Bridge on 17 July 1856 by the Jedburgh Railway Company. To the northeast was a goods siding. The station's name was changed to Jedfoot in 1913. It closed on 13 August 1948. The platform still remains, albeit in an overgrown state.

Preceding station	Disused railways	Following station
Nisbet; Line and station closed	North British Railway; Jedburgh Railway	Jedburgh; Line and station closed
