= Kelso Line =

Former railway line in Scotland

The Kelso Line was a ten-and-a-half-mile (16.9 km) long North British Railway built double track branch railway line in the Borders, Scotland, that ran from a junction south of St. Boswells on the Waverley Line to Kelso (the line ended at a temporary terminus at Wallace Nick until 1851) via three intermediate stations, Maxton, Rutherford and Roxburgh Junction where a branch line to Jedburgh joined the line.

Little of the existing railway line remains, with most of the former track now occupied by the A6968 Kelso Bypass. Kelso railway station building – where the Kelso Line turned into the Kelso Branch, continuing on to Sprouston, and terminating at Berwick Upon Tweed – is no longer standing.

== History ==
=== Opening ===
The line opened as far as a temporary terminus at Wallace Neuk to the west of Kelso on 17 January 1850, and to Kelso itself in the January of the next year. The North Eastern Railway Kelso Branch line coming into Kelso from the west had reached Sprouston on 27 July 1849 leaving a two-mile gap between the two railheads. This gap was closed on 1 June 1851 when the North Eastern Railway line reached its destination.

=== Alternative route ===
The joined line provided part of an alternative route when the East Coast Main Line was blocked north of Tweedmouth most notably in August 1948 when the main line was closed for three months. The line served the same purpose in 1954.

Singling in the 1930s of the double track section between Kelso and the Waverley Route and an overall speed restriction made diversion working difficult.

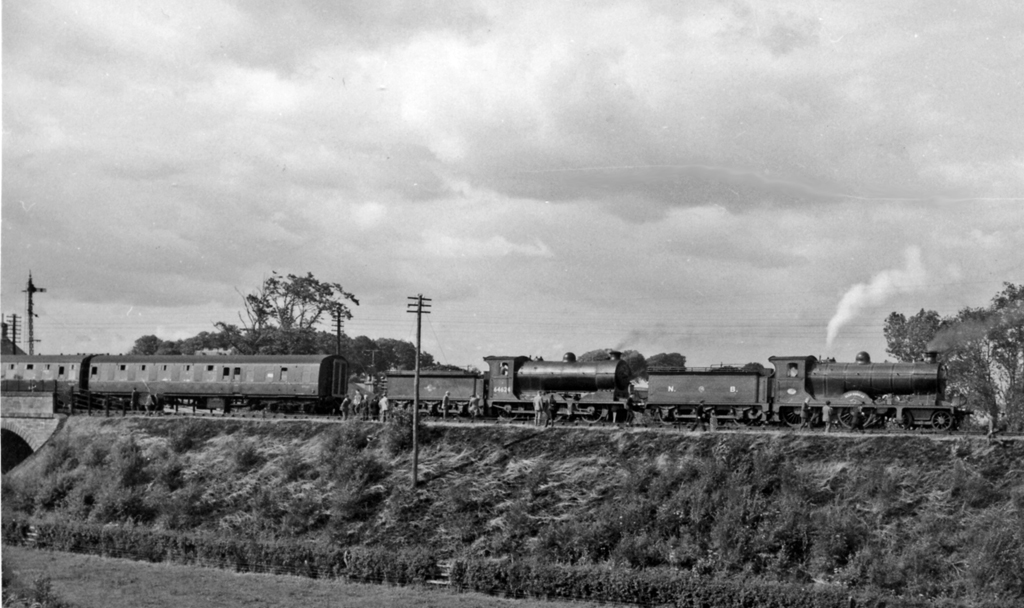
A rail tour on the line in the Roxburgh area in 1961.

=== Closure ===
Passenger services ceased on 15 June 1964 with freight services ending on 1 April 1968.

== See also ==
The Kelso and Jedburgh railway branch lines
