= Wallace Nick railway station =

Short-lived railway station in Kelso, Scottish Borders

Wallace Nick

General information
- Location: Kelso, Scottish Borders; Scotland

Other information
- Status: Disused

History
- Original company: North British Railway
- Pre-grouping: North British Railway

Key dates
- 17 June 1850: Opened
- 27 January 1851: Closed
Location

Wallace Nick railway station served the town of Kelso, Scottish Borders, Scotland from 1850 to 1851 on the Kelso Line.

== History ==
This temporary terminus opened on 17 June 1850 by the North British Railway. It was only open for 7 months while Kelso station was prepared, closing on 27 January 1851.

Preceding station	Disused railways	Following station
Roxburgh; Line and station closed	North British Railway; Kelso Line	Kelso; Line and station closed
