= St. Boswells railway station =

Former railway station in Scotland

St. Boswells
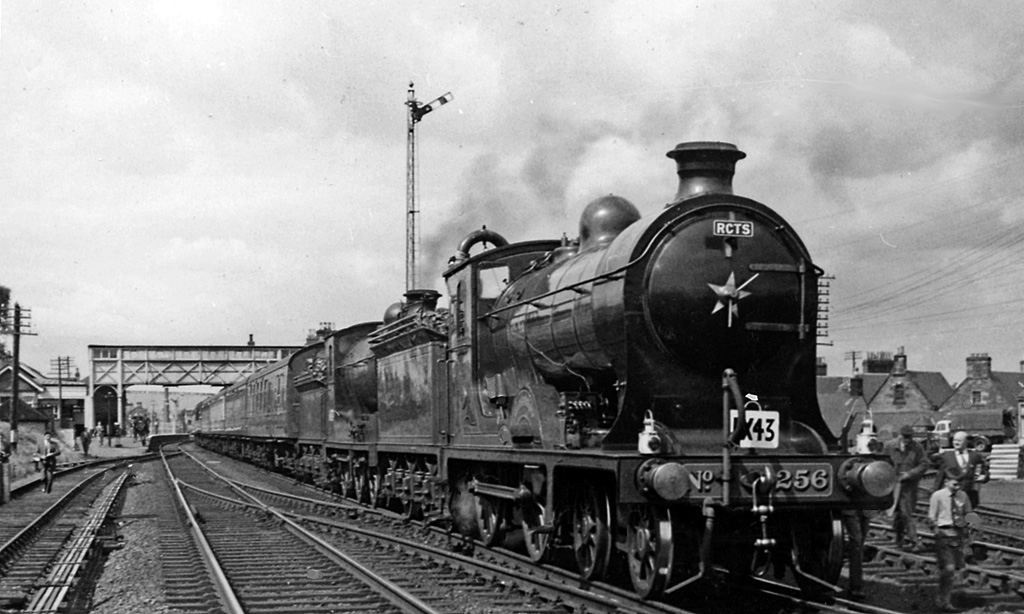
- A Rail Tour train at St Boswells station in 1961

General information
- Location: Newtown St Boswells, Scottish Borders; Scotland
- Coordinates: 55.5772°N 2.6724°W
- Grid reference: NT577317
- Platforms: 2

Other information
- Status: Disused

History
- Original company: North British Railway
- Pre-grouping: North British Railway
- Post-grouping: LNER; British Rail (Scottish Region)

Key dates
- 1 November 1849: Station opened as Newtown Junction
- January 1853: Station name changed to New Town St Boswells
- 1 March 1865: Station name changed to St Boswells
- 6 January 1969: Station closed to passengers
- 28 April 1969: Station closed completely
Location

St. Boswells railway station was a railway station that served the villages of Newtown St Boswells and St Boswells, Scottish Borders, Scotland from 1849 to 1969 on the Waverley Route. Although named after the larger village of St Boswells, the station was situated in Newtown St Boswells, located 1 mile (1.6 km) to the northwest.

== History ==
The station opened on 1 November 1849 as Newtown Junction by the North British Railway. The station was situated on both sides of the B6398. The name changed to New Town St Boswells in January 1853 and to St Boswells on 1 March 1865. The goods yard was north of the station and had three sidings, one of which passed through a timber goods shed. The yard was later extended to the east with further sidings that served the Southern Central Market. The goods shed closed in November 1959. The station was closed to passengers on 6 January 1969 but remained open for goods traffic until 28 April 1969.

Preceding station	Historical railways	Following station
Newstead (Borders); Line and station closed	North British Railway; Waverley Route	Charlesfield Halt; Line and station closed
Earlston; Line and station closed	North British Railway; Berwickshire Railway	Terminus
Terminus	North British Railway; Kelso Line	Maxton; Line and station closed
