= Nisbet railway station =

Disused railway station in Nisbet, Scottish Borders

Nisbet
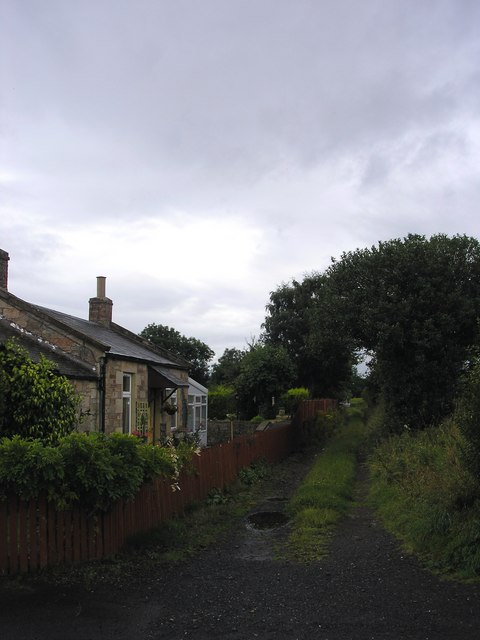
- The site of the station in 2009

General information
- Location: Nisbet, Scottish Borders; Scotland
- Coordinates: 55.5221°N 2.5179°W
- Grid reference: NT674255
- Platforms: 1

Other information
- Status: Disused

History
- Original company: Jedburgh Railway Company
- Pre-grouping: North British Railway
- Post-grouping: LNER; British Railways (Scottish Region)

Key dates
- 17 July 1856: Opened
- 13 August 1948: Closed
Location

Nisbet railway station served the hamlet of Nisbet, Scottish Borders, Scotland from 1856 to 1948, on the Jedburgh Railway.

== History ==
The station opened on 17 July 1856 by the Jedburgh Railway Company. There was a siding to the southeast and a level crossing to the north. The station closed on 13 August 1948.

Preceding station	Disused railways	Following station
Kirkbank; Line and station closed	North British Railway; Jedburgh Railway	Jedfoot; Line and station closed
