= Kirkbank railway station =

Disused railway station in Old Ormiston, Scottish Borders

Kirkbank
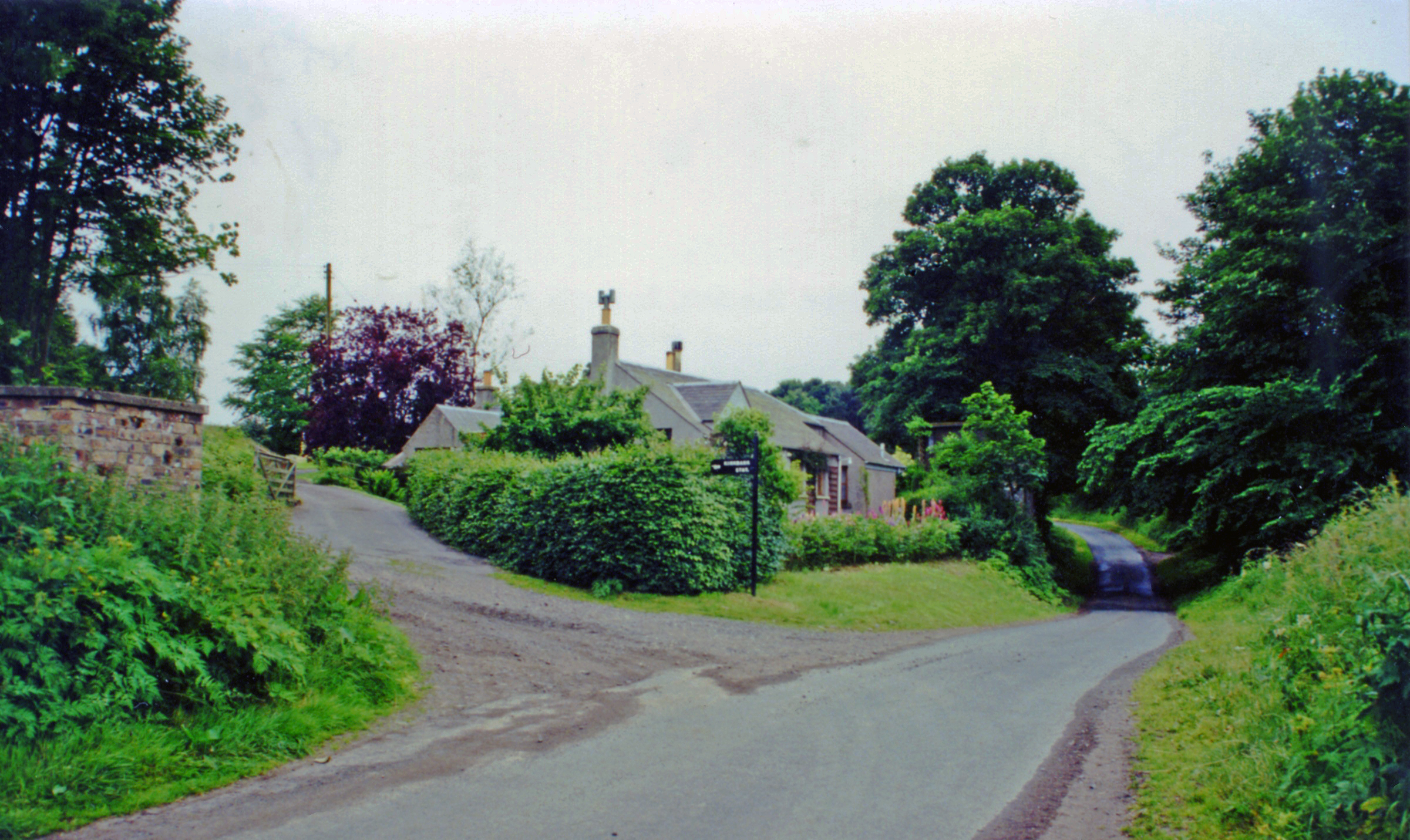

General information
- Location: Old Ormiston, Scottish Borders; Scotland
- Coordinates: 55.5458°N 2.4809°W
- Grid reference: NT697281
- Platforms: 1

Other information
- Status: Disused

History
- Original company: Jedburgh Railway Company
- Pre-grouping: North British Railway
- Post-grouping: LNER; British Railways (Scottish Region)

Key dates
- 17 July 1856: Opened as Old Ormiston
- 20 May 1868: Name changed to Kirkbank
- 13 August 1948: Closed
Location

Kirkbank railway station served Old Ormiston, in the Scottish Borders, Scotland from 1856 to 1948 on the Jedburgh Railway.

== History ==
The station opened as Old Ormiston on 17 July 1856 by the Jedburgh Railway Company. To the east was the goods yard. The station's name was changed to Kirkbank on 20 May 1868, despite the fact that it was situated almost a mile away from Kirkbank. The station closed on 13 August 1948.

Preceding station	Disused railways	Following station
Roxburgh Junction; Line and station closed	North British Railway; Jedburgh Railway	Nisbet; Line and station closed
