= Jedburgh railway station =

Disused railway station in Jedburgh, Scottish Borders

Jedburgh
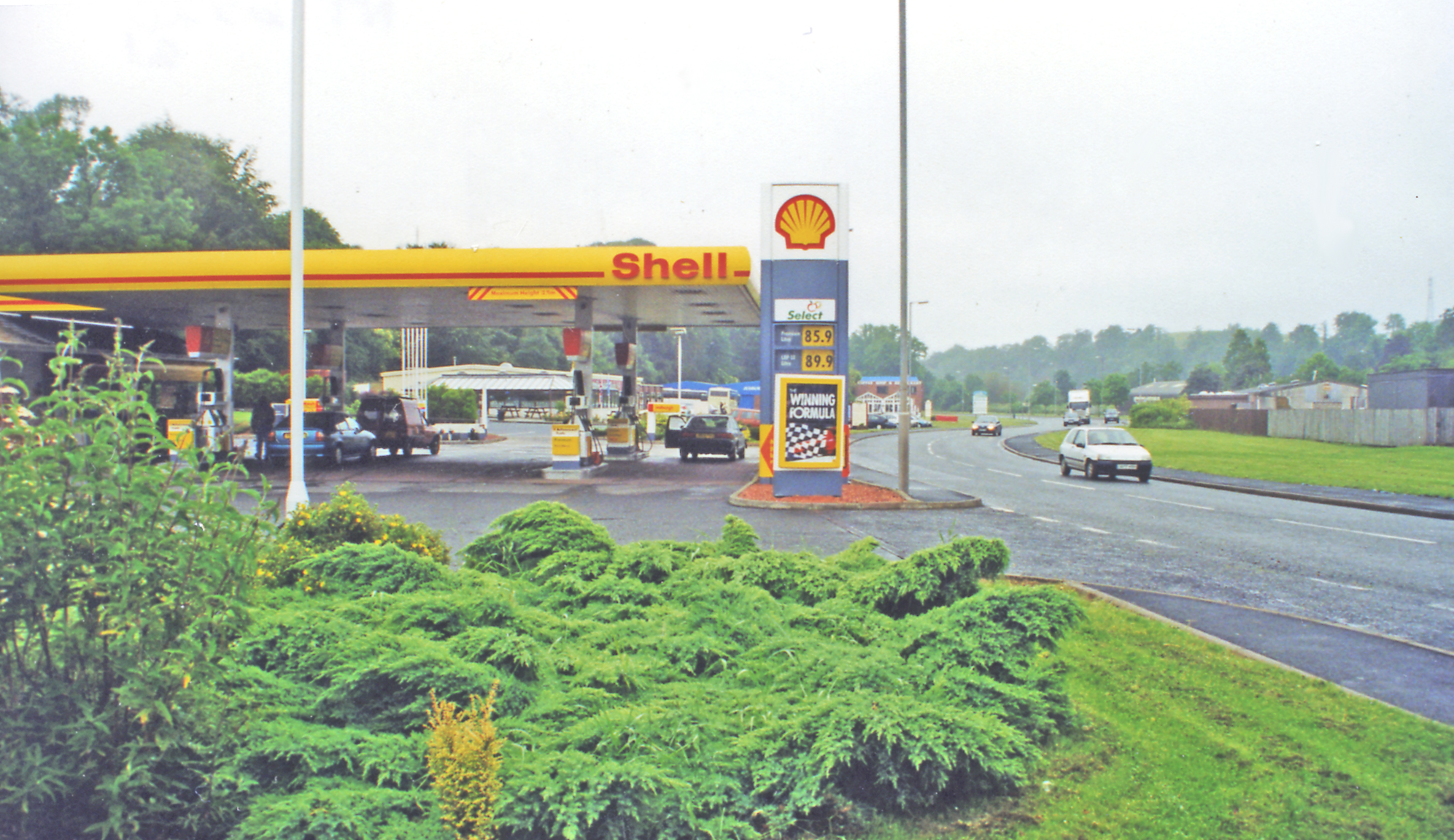
- The site of the station, looking northward to Bongate, in 2000

General information
- Location: Jedburgh, Scottish Borders; Scotland
- Coordinates: 55.4864°N 2.545°W
- Grid reference: NT656215
- Platforms: 1

Other information
- Status: Disused

History
- Original company: Jedburgh Railway Company
- Pre-grouping: North British Railway
- Post-grouping: LNER; British Railways (Scottish Region)

Key dates
- 17 July 1856: Opened
- 13 August 1948: Closed
- 10 August 1964: Closed for freight
Location

Jedburgh railway station served the town of Jedburgh, Scottish Borders, Scotland from 1856 to 1964 on the Jedburgh Railway.

== History ==
The station opened on 17 July 1856 by the Jedburgh Railway Company. To the east was a locomotive shed and to the north was a goods yard. To the northeast was the signal box. The station closed for passengers on 13 August 1948 and closed to goods on 10 August 1964. Nothing remains.

Preceding station	Disused railways	Following station
Jedfoot; Line and station closed	North British Railway; Jedburgh Railway	Terminus
