= Roxburgh railway station =

Disused railway station in Roxburgh, Scottish Borders

Roxburgh
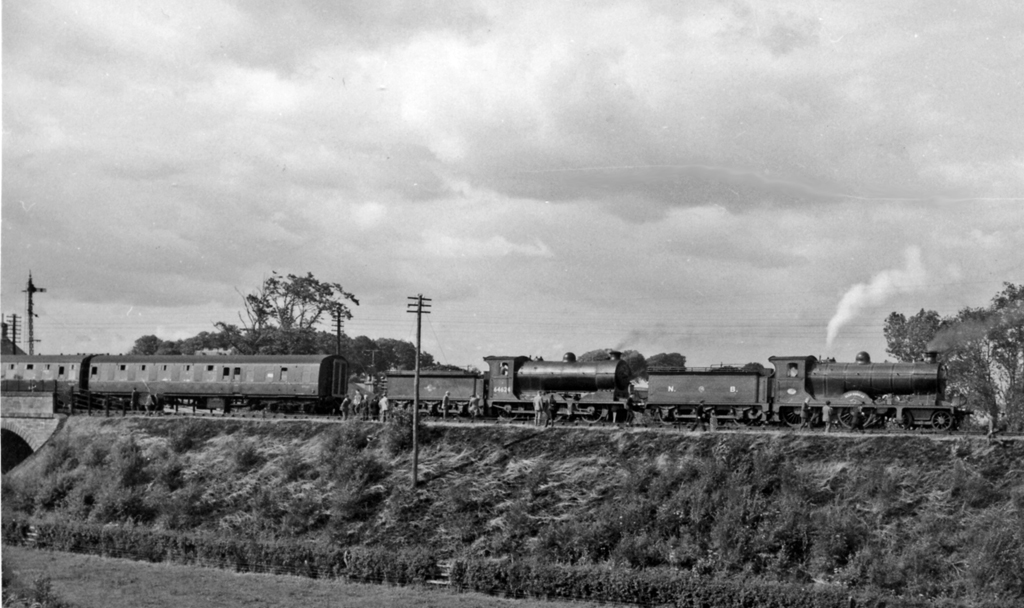
- Steam trains J37 and D34 at the station in 1961

General information
- Location: Roxburgh, Scottish Borders; Scotland
- Coordinates: 55.5677°N 2.4812°W
- Grid reference: NT697305
- Platforms: 2

Other information
- Status: Disused

History
- Original company: North British Railway
- Post-grouping: LNER; British Railways (Scottish Region)

Key dates
- June 1850: Opened
- 15 June 1964: Closed
Location

Roxburgh railway station was on the Kelso Line, and served the village of Roxburgh, Scottish Borders, from 1850 to 1964.

== History ==
The station was opened on 17 June 1850 by the North British Railway. It closed to both passengers and goods traffic on 15 June 1964.

Preceding station	Disused railways	Following station
Rutherford; Line and station closed	North British Railway; Kelso Line	Wallace Nick; Line and station closed
Rutherford; Line and station closed	North British Railway; Jedburgh Railway	Kirkbank; Line and station closed
