= Kelso railway station =

Disused railway station in Kelso, Scottish Borders

Kelso

General information
- Location: Kelso, Scottish Borders; Scotland
- Coordinates: 55.5909°N 2.4285°W
- Grid reference: NT730331
- Platforms: 3

Other information
- Status: Disused

History
- Original company: North British Railway
- Pre-grouping: North British Railway
- Post-grouping: LNER British Rail (Scottish Region)

Key dates
- 27 January 1851: Opened
- 15 June 1964: Closed for passengers
- 30 March 1968: closed for freight
Location

Kelso railway station served the town of Kelso, Scottish Borders, Scotland from 1851 to 1964 on the Kelso Line.

== History ==
The station opened on 27 January 1851 by the North British Railway. Nearby were sidings with a goods and engine shed. The station closed to passengers on 15 June 1964. The last freight train ran on 29 March 1968.

Preceding station	Disused railways	Following station
Wallace Nick; Line and station closed	North British Railway; Kelso Line	Sprouston; Line and station closed
