= Maxton, Roxburghshire =

Village in Scottish Borders, Scotland

Coordinates: 55.563°N 2.6151°W

Maxton is a hamlet and civil parish in Roxburghshire, Scotland, and part of the Scottish Borders region.

Maxton lies just off the A68, south of St. Boswells, north of Ancrum, and east of Newtown St. Boswells

Maxton is part of the St. Cuthbert's Way long distance footpath.

== History ==
Walter Stewart, 6th High Steward of Scotland, made a charter to John St.Clair, his valet, of the lands of Maxton, Roxburghshire, circa 1320/1326, one of the witnesses being "Roberto de Lauwedir (Robert de Lauder) tunc justiciario Laudonie" (Justiciar of Lothian).

A Retour dated March 31, 1670, is recorded whereby Elizabeth and Anna Scott were served heirs to their father George Scott, brother-German to Sir Walter Scott of Whitslaid, Selkirkshire, in the barony of Maxtoun etc. the barony of Dolphingstoune and Falla, lands of Morebattle and Cowbog, etc., all united into the barony of Maxtoun by Charter granted to Sir John Ker of Jedburgh, knight, and John Ker of Longnewton, his son, under the Great Seal of Scotland (of which clearly the Kers have some time parted). Also the barony of Lyntoun, lands and lordship of Jedburgh, etc.

== Church ==
Maxton Church is the local parish Church. It is largely mid 18th century in construction but has components dating to the 17th century. It is said to have been built on the site of an earlier church, itself a site of Christian worship since the 10th century.

== Gallery ==
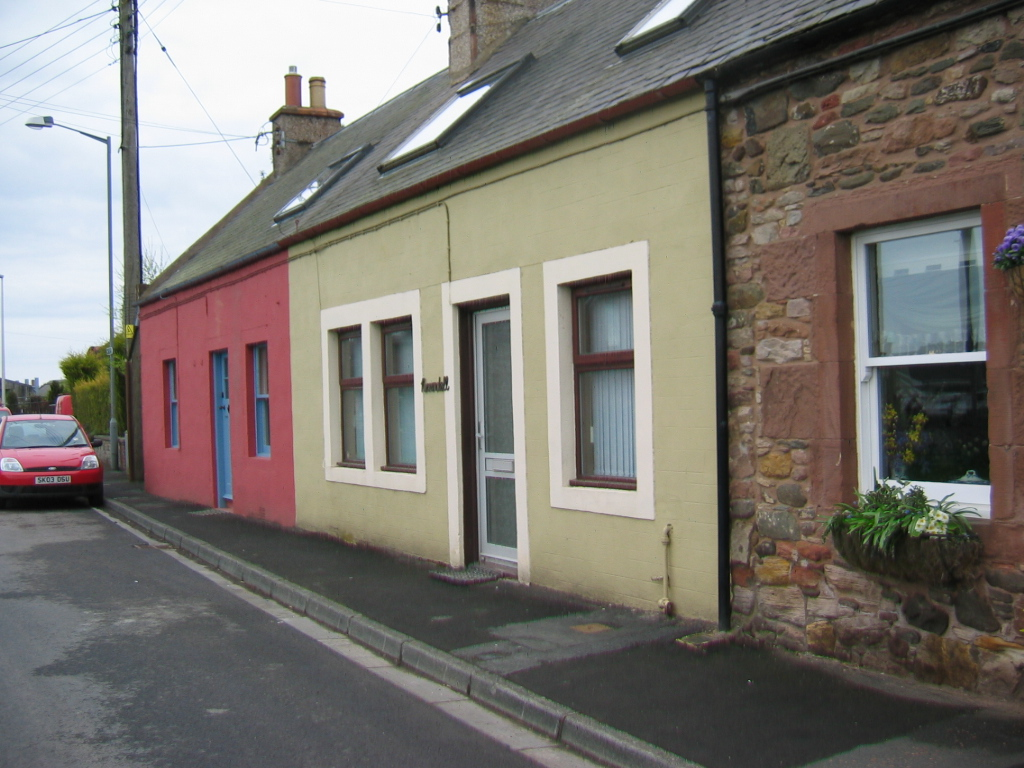
Cottages in Maxton

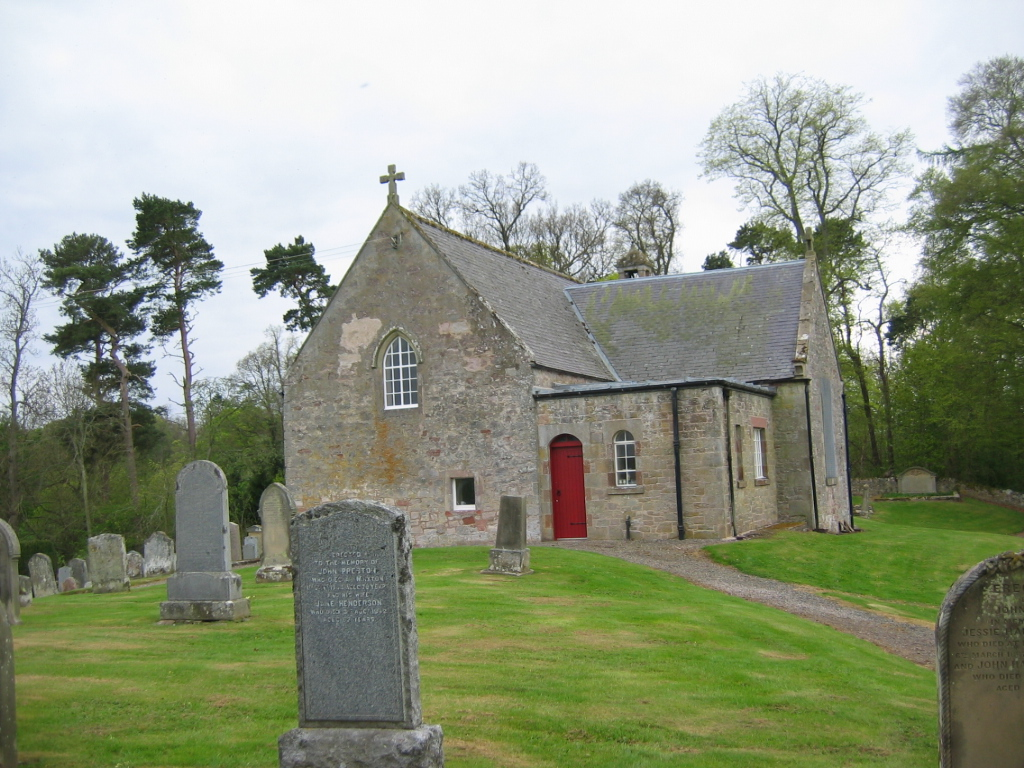
Maxton Church

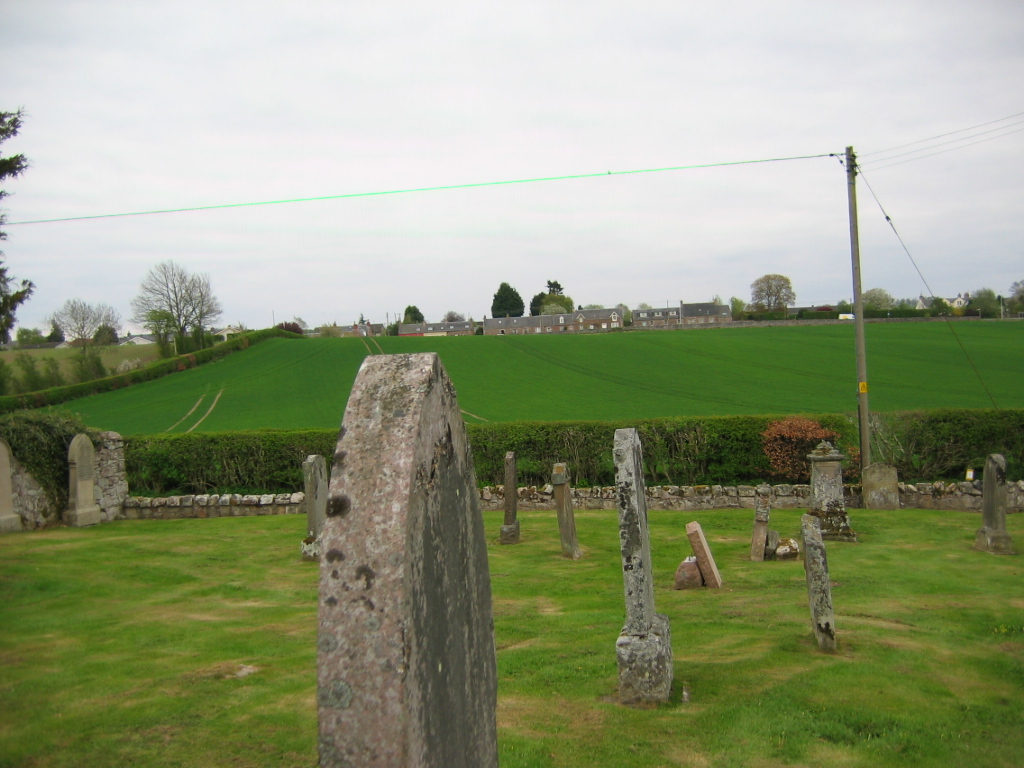
Village field and lane

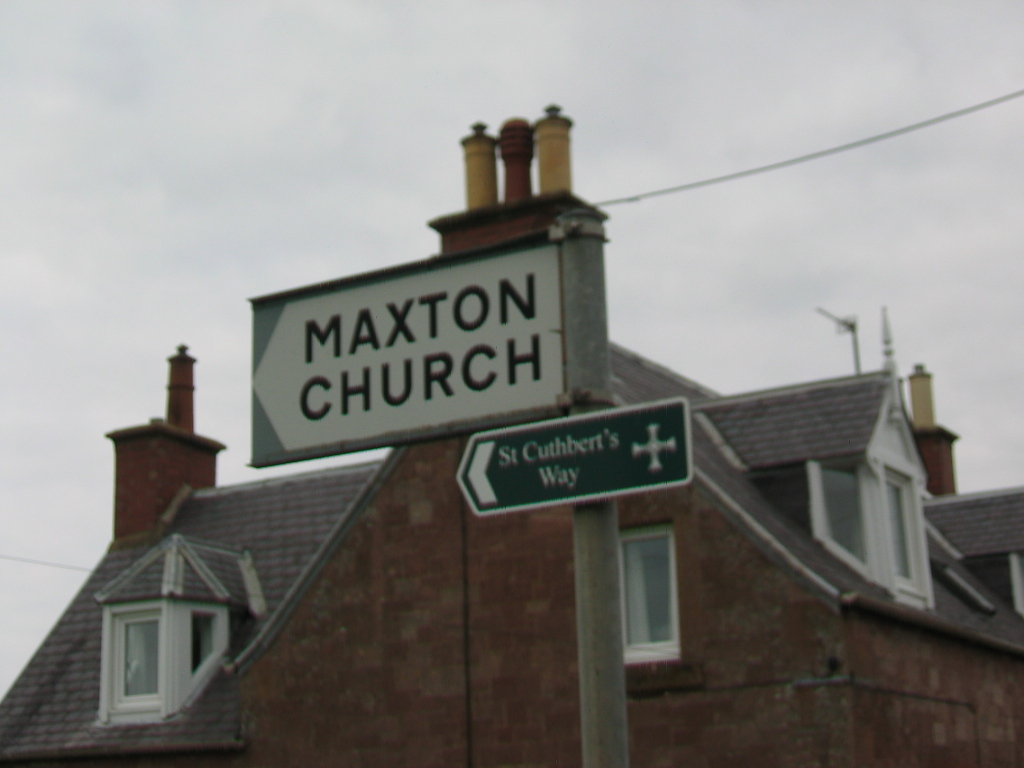
St. Cuthbert's Way

== See also ==
- List of places in the Scottish Borders
- List of places in Scotland
