= Alnwick Lionheart railway station =

Railway station in Northumberland, England

Alnwick Lionheart
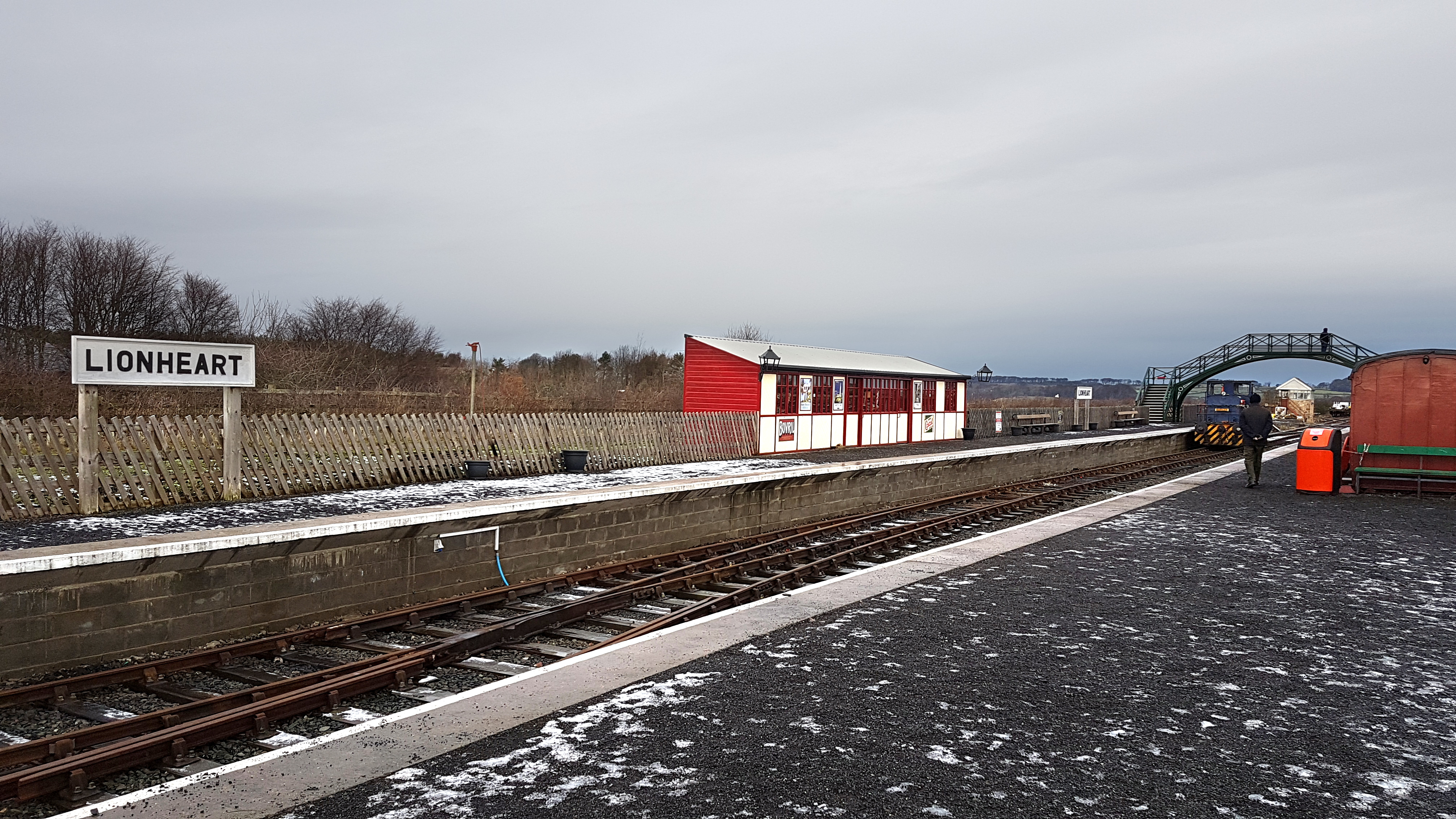
- Looking towards Alnmouth along the station platforms in December 2017

General information
- Location: Alnwick, Northumberland; England
- Coordinates: 55.4022°N 1.6864°W
- System: Station on heritage railway
- Manager: Aln Valley Railway Trust
- Platforms: 2

Key dates
- 27 February 2012: Construction begins
- 30 October 2013: Official opening
Location

Alnwick Lionheart is a railway station situated on the edge of the Lionheart Enterprise Park on the outskirts of Alnwick, Northumberland. It is the western terminus and operational base of the preserved Aln Valley Railway which is currently working to rebuild the original Alnwick branch line from there to Alnmouth station. The station was constructed on a different site from the original Alnwick station due to the construction of the A1 Alnwick bypass which removed a section of the original trackbed on the edge of the town as well as the construction of buildings on the original station site and some of the trackbed on the approach to it.

== History ==
The Newcastle and Berwick Railway (N&BR) main line between Gateshead and Berwick was authorised by the Newcastle and Berwick Railway Act 1845 (8 & 9 Vict. c. clxiii) of 31 July 1845 but due to its primary purpose being for inter-city traffic, it passed almost 3 miles east of Alnwick, the area's main market town. Thus also included within this act were powers to construct a branch line to link Alnwick to the main line at Alnmouth station. Nonetheless, the company's priority was to construct its main line which was completed 1 July 1847. The delay to the opening of the branch line meant that a temporary horse-drawn omnibus service was provided between Alnwick and Lesbury station on the main line.

This was, however, short-lived and the contract for construction of the branch was let in August 1848, with rapid progress meaning that the line could formally open on the 5 August 1850. The original 1850 Alnwick station was constructed at the edge of the town, adjacent to Shilbottle Coal Company depot (linked to Shilbottle Colliery by a wagonway). It was a modest single-platform station and a steady growth in traffic meant that it had become inadequate by 1885 when Alnwick Town Council requested that North Eastern Railway (NER) (successor to the N&BR) improve the facilities provided for the town.

After some initial reluctance, the NER constructed a new station, closer to the town centre, which opened on 5 September 1887, coinciding with the opening of the NER-built Alnwick to Cornhill Railway, and converted the original station building to a warehouse.

From the 1920s onwards, traffic on Northumberland's railways declined due to improvements in road transport, resulting in the early closure of the Cornhill line to passengers on 22 September 1930. By the mid-1960s the branch from Alnmouth was making significant losses and, despite attempts to reduce costs by singling the line, it was ultimately decided that the line should close. The intention to close the line, and station, was announced in March 1966 and was to take effect on 6 June 1966 however significant opposition led to an appeal being made to the Ministry of Transport. The appeal was unsuccessful and closure was authorised on 28 September 1967; consequentially, passenger services were withdrawn from 29 January 1968 and goods services ceased on 7 October of that year.

After the station's closure the station goods yard and the approach were gradually converted to other uses, with main station building being ultimately converted for retail use, including the Barter Books second-hand bookshop.

== Preservation ==
Plans to redevelop the original station site in 1993 (though later abandoned) led to the formation of the Aln Valley Railway Society (AVRS) (since amalgamated into the Aln Valley Railway Trust) in 1995; in 1997 the AVRS announced its intention to reopen almost the entire line utilising the last available section of the original station as its western terminus and reconstructing the rest of the line from there to Alnmouth. However, the high cost of bridging the dual-carriageway Alnwick bypass meant these plans ultimately proved unsuccessful and instead plans were later revised so that a new station would be built on site close to where the A1 intersected the original line.

Planning permission to construct the new station and rebuild the original line as far as Edenhill Bridge was granted by Northumberland County Council on 1 July 2010, the lease for the site signed on 22 February 2012 and groundworks began 5 days later. The station site first opened to visitors five months later on 14 July, but only to demonstrate the ongoing work, exhibits of rolling stock and an indoor exhibition area, café, souvenir shop and model railway; the first train (an engineer's train) did not run until 3 November 2012. Passengers were first carried 28 March 2013 using the railway's Wickham trolley for short rides from the railway's sidings to the eastern headshunt at the oppersite end of the site; this service continued throughout the 2013 season. Later that year, on 10 September, a steam locomotive operated within the new station site for the first time (though not for public passengers) and the station was formally opened by the Duke of Northumberland on 30 October 2013.

By October 2015, initial plans for the station (including the platforms, footbridge, signal box and locomotive shed) were virtually complete and thus work began on linking the station's track layout with the original trackbed to Alnmouth. The new station was constructed within a field at a higher level than the original trackbed adjacent to it (there being a difference in height of approximately 4 metres between them) and thus it was necessary to partially infill a section of the original railway cutting adjacent to the site to allow trains to descend onto the original alignment at a suitable gradient. The link to the original alignment was completed in time for the first public passenger services to run from Lionheart station onto the original trackbed on 28 December 2017, the first time that public passenger service had operated on the original line for almost 50 years. As of August 2018, passenger trains regularly run from the station to Alndyke Farm Crossing, just beyond Bridge 6.

In July 2018, the AVRT was awarded a Rural Development Programme for England grant (using funds jointly provided by the European Agricultural Fund for Rural Development and by the Department for Environment, Food and Rural Affairs) together with 20% match funding from Sustrans which constitute a total of £146,600. The grant is to be used to cover the costs of groundworks and track materials to extend the running line for a further 1 mile to a point just before the line passed under Edenhill Bridge where it will also cover the costs of constructing a new station, Greenrigg Halt. As of December 2018, work is underway on the construction of this extension.

Most of the station facilities are currently provided in portacabins (though a single-storey waiting shelter has been constructed on platform 2 and a grounded NER coach body provides temporary waiting facilities on platform 1) however the railway has longer-term ambitions to create a permanent station building, broadly inspired by that at the former Warkworth station but with a roof styled after those used at stations on the Alnwick to Cornhill railway. Early designs for this envisage a two-storey "H-shaped" central nucleus containing a large entrance hall, toilets and kitchen on the lower floor and a museum, offices and education rooms on the upper floor. It is also intended to include two wings: the northern (Alnmouth end) one would provide a café area while the southern (buffer stop end) one accommodate a shop, boiler room and stations master's office. Elsewhere within the station site, in the longer-term it is intended that a replica goods shed (to be used for maintenance) and NER-style coal drop will be created on the east side of the existing storage sidings and an additional platform will be created on the loading road.

== Gallery ==
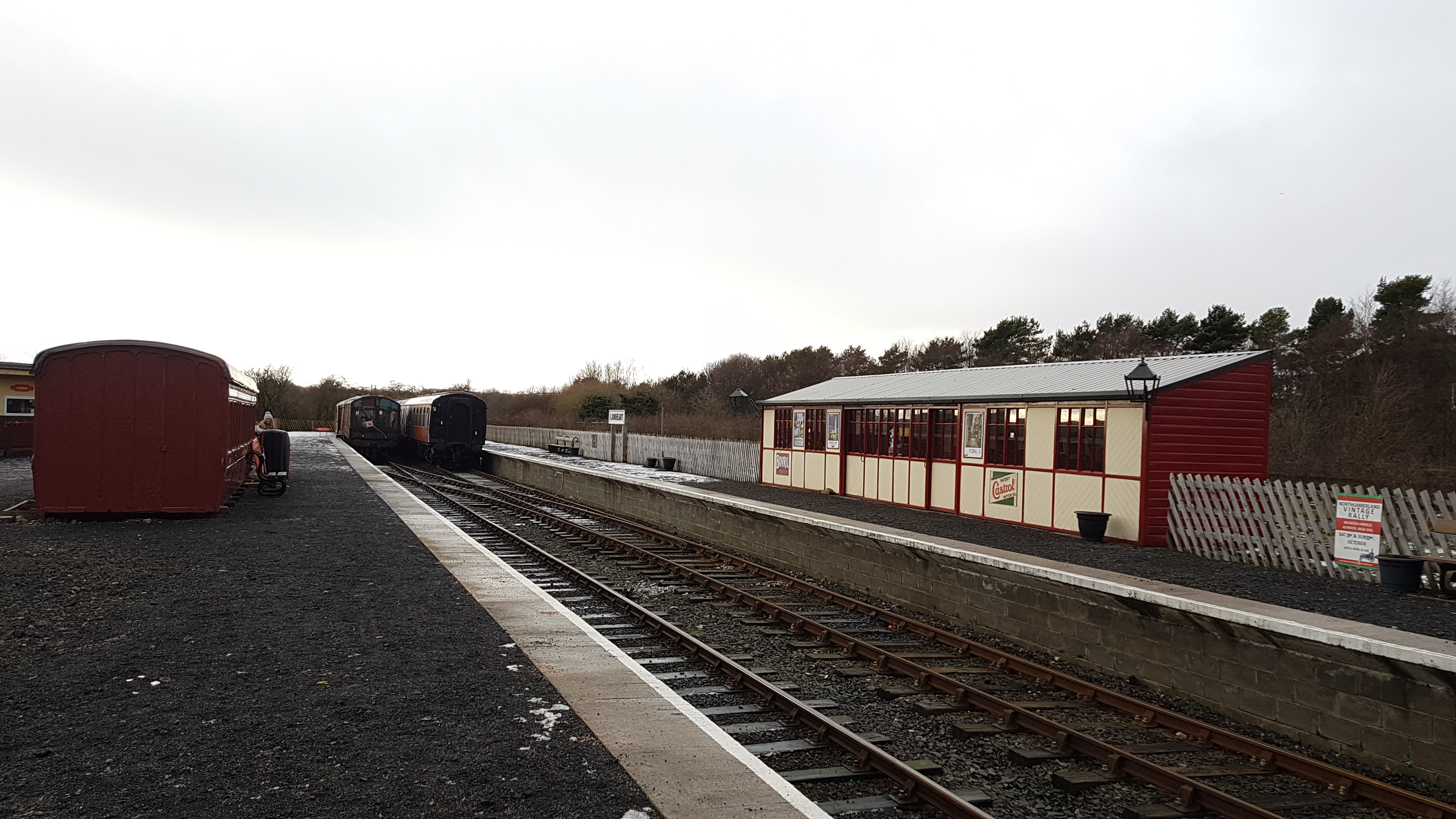
Looking towards the buffer stop along the station platforms

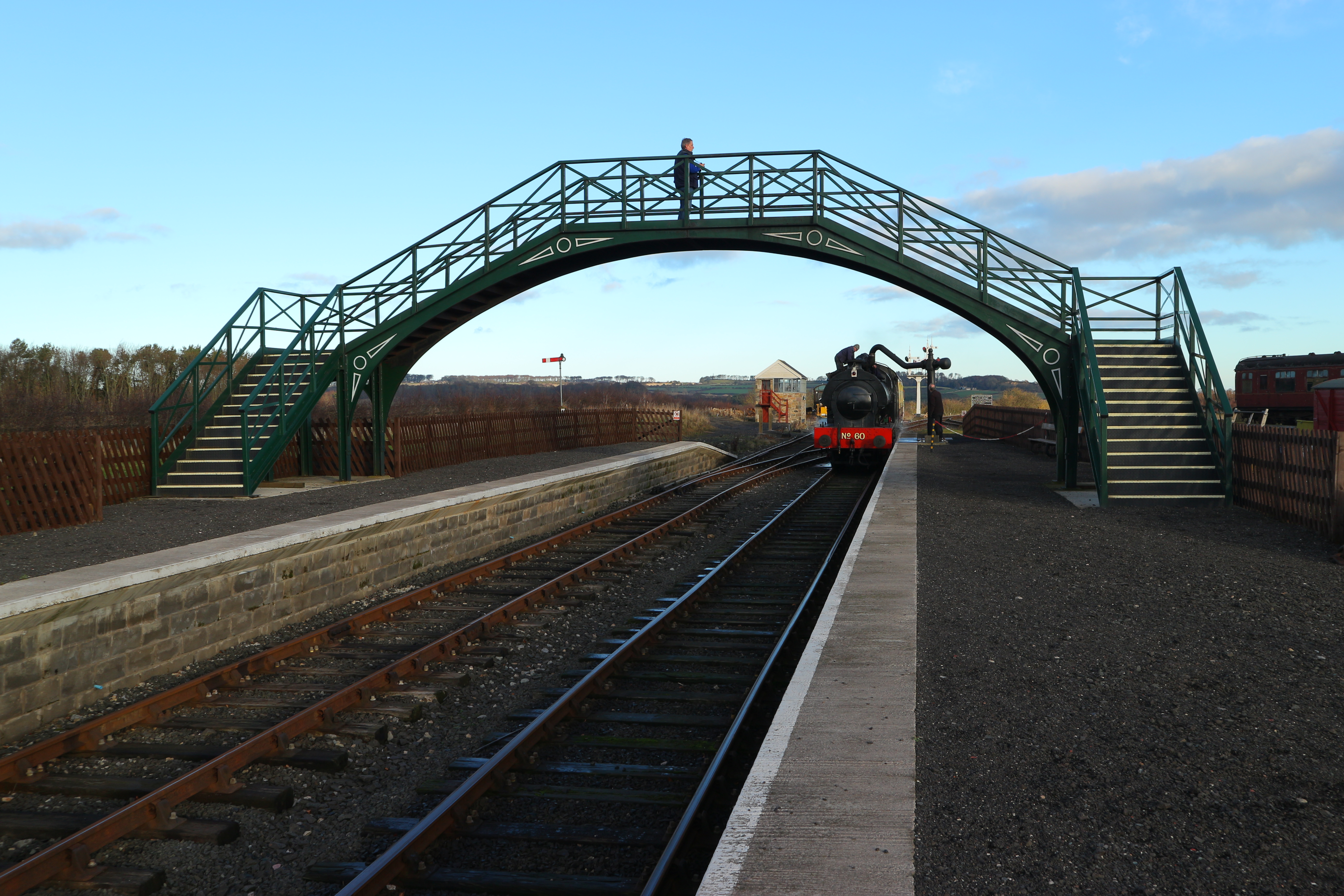
The northern (Alnmouth) end of the station platforms, with the station footbridge in the foreground and ex-NCB Hunslet Austerity 0-6-0ST No. 60 (works No. 3686), taking on water in the background

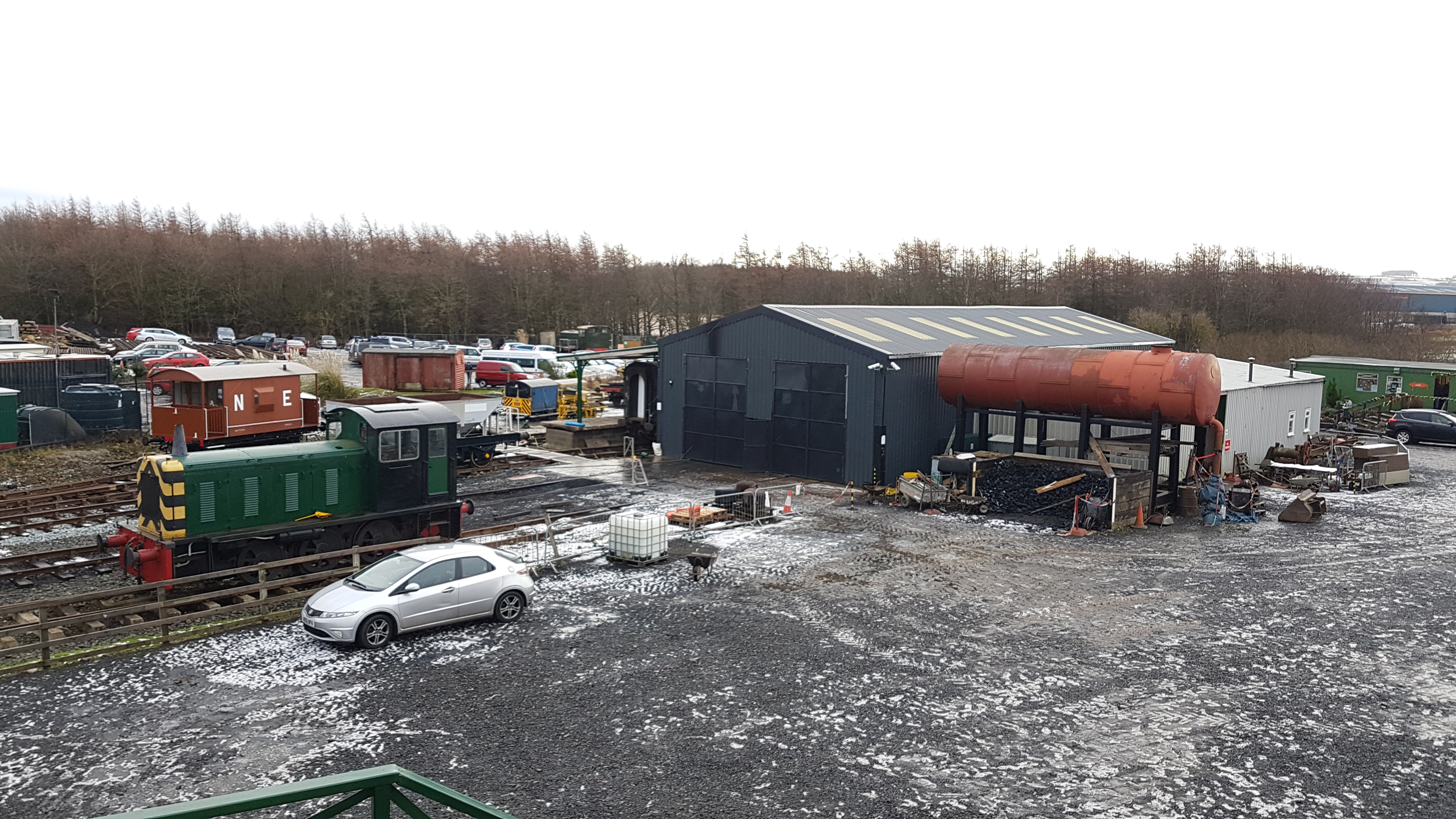
The railway's Lionheart Engine Shed and the associated sidings. These are part of the Lionheart station site.

Preceding station	Heritage railways	Following station
Proposed railways
Terminus	Aln Valley Railway	Greenrigg Halt Terminus
