= North Sunderland railway station =

Former railway station in England

Coordinates: 55.5776°N 1.6689°W

North Sunderland

General information
- Location: North Sunderland, Northumberland; England
- Grid reference: NU209315
- Platforms: 1

Other information
- Status: Disused

History
- Original company: North Sunderland Railway

Key dates
- 1 August 1898: Station opened for freight
- 14 December 1898: Station opened for passengers
- 27 October 1951: Station closed
Location

North Sunderland railway station was a brick built station on the single track branch of the North Sunderland Railway, in north east England. The line connected the village and port of Seahouses to the railway network via a junction at Chathill.

== History ==
Authorised in 1892, the North Sunderland Railway was built privately to serve the newly constructed harbour at Seahouses. Construction started in 1896, and the line opened in 1898 for freight on 1 August and for passengers on 14 December. The line was rarely profitable, and thus the proposed station at Fleetham and the extension to Bamburgh were never constructed. The line was taken over by the LNER in 1939, and it closed on 27 October 1951 and officially wound up in April 1952.

Preceding station	Disused railways	Following station
Chathill	London and North Eastern Railway; North Sunderland Railway	Seahouses
