= Seahouses railway station =

Former railway station in England

Coordinates: 55.5815°N 1.6550°W

Seahouses
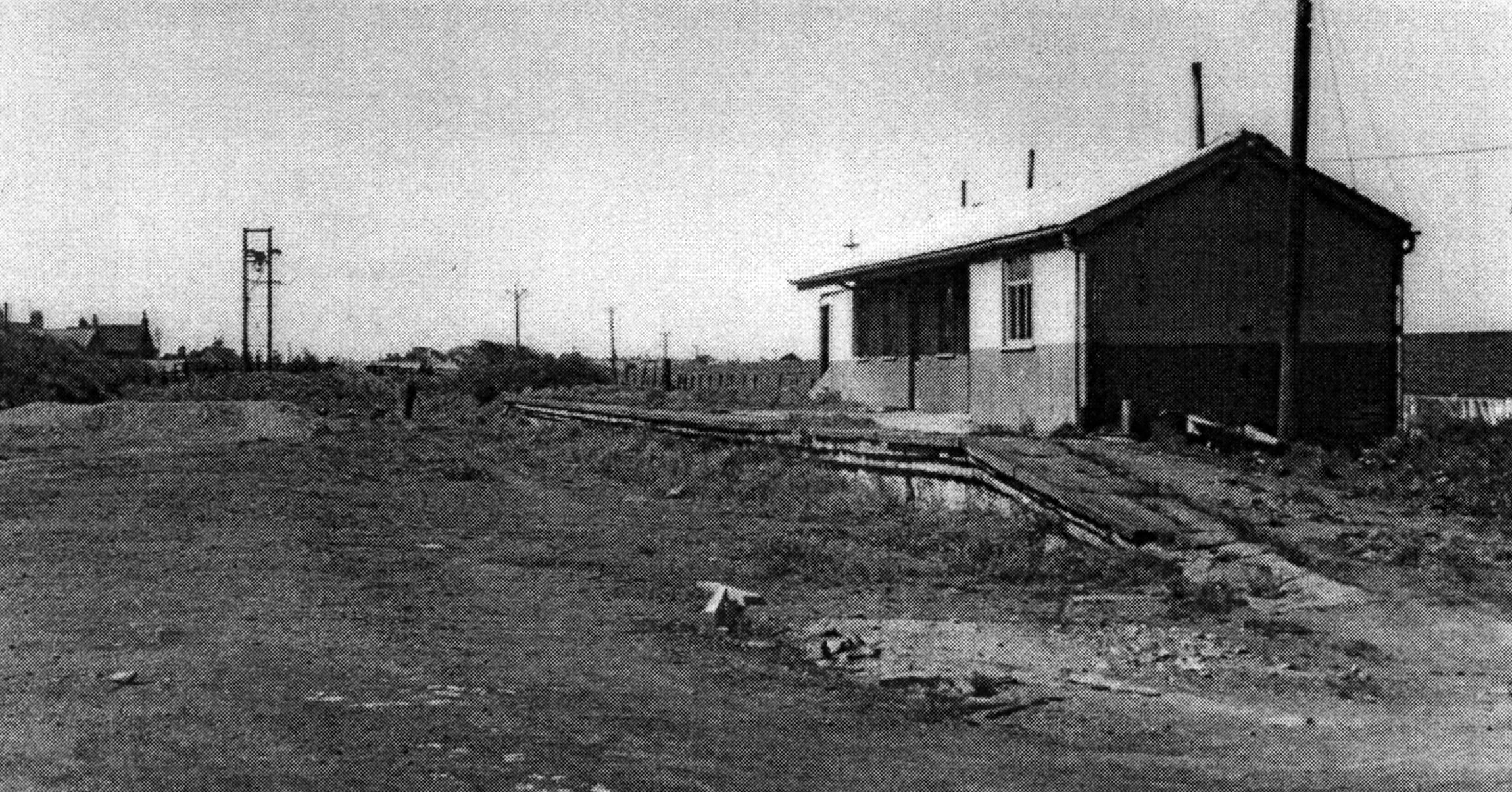
- Seahouses station, remains 1957.

General information
- Location: Seahouses, Northumberland; England
- Grid reference: NU218320
- Platforms: 1

Other information
- Status: Disused

History
- Original company: North Sunderland Railway

Key dates
- 1 August 1898: Station opened for freight
- 14 December 1898: Station opened for passengers
- 27 October 1951: Station closed
Location

Seahouses railway station was the brick and wood built eastern terminus of the single track branch of the North Sunderland Railway, in north east England. The line connected village and port of Seahouses to the railway network via a junction at Chathill.

== History ==
Authorised in 1892 the North Sunderland Railway was built privately to serve the newly constructed harbour at Seahouses. Construction started in 1896, and the line opened in 1898 for freight on 1 August, and passengers on 14 December. The line was rarely profitable and thus the proposed station at Fleetham, and the extension to Bamburgh were never constructed. The line was taken over by the LNER in 1939, and the line closed on 27 October 1951 and officially wound up in April 1952.

The construction of the station provided a link to the fishing port and for day trips along the coast and to the Farne Islands.

The station was demolished and the site is now the village car park.

Preceding station	Disused railways	Following station
North Sunderland	London and North Eastern Railway; North Sunderland Railway	Terminus
