= West Fleetham =

Hamlet in Northumberland, England

Coordinates: 55.5484°N 1.6935°W

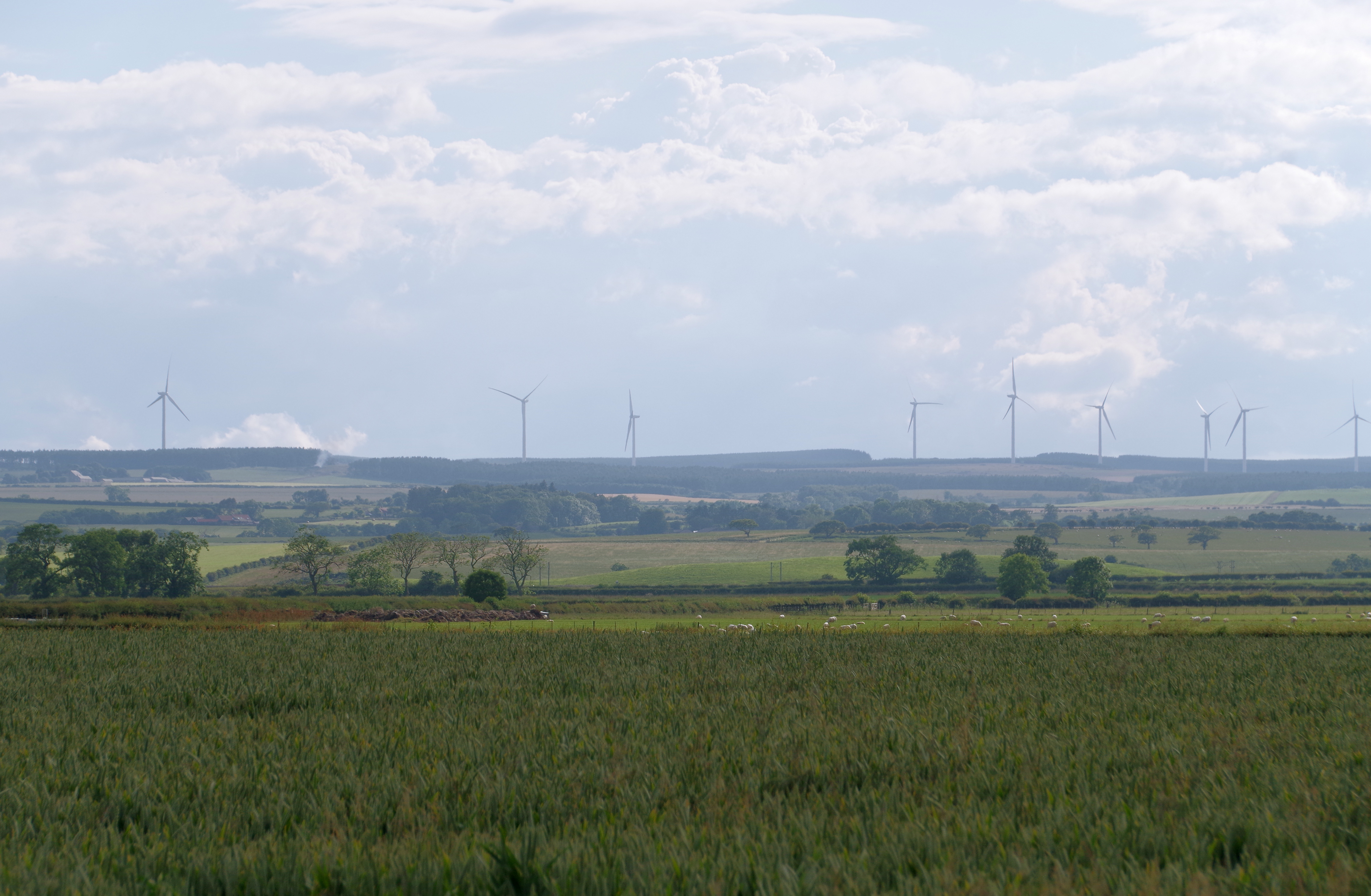

- Location within Northumberland
- Civil parish: Beadnell
- Unitary authority: Northumberland
- Ceremonial county: Northumberland
- Region: North East
- Country: England
- Sovereign state: United Kingdom

West Fleetham is a small hamlet in the civil parish of Beadnell, in Northumberland, England situated about 4 miles (6.4 km) from Seahouses and 2 miles (3.2 km) from Chathill railway station.

It originally had two working water mills fed by the Long Nanny stream these were fed by means of a sluices and a sluice gate the remnants of which can still be seen in the woods surrounding the stream.

The sluice gate was unusual as it had fitted a water wheel that drove a generator which in turn fed power to the nearby house it also had a shed full of batteries to act as a store, the installation was made by the local garage owner (Mr Ord) whose wife still lived there until the 1970s.

There is a quarry pond in the village that no one seems to know much about and was used at one time as a dump for rubbish and old cars and now is a popular wildlife habitat.

To the North of the village is the disused North Sunderland Railway, which ran from Chathill to Seahouses but closed in 1951. The route is marked by its cutting and bridge.

In the fields surrounding the village are signs or ancient agriculture from the standing stone to the ridged contours of the fields showing strip agriculture and the dark patches of old coal mining.
