= Alnwick branch line =

Heritage railway in Northumberland, England

Alnwick Branch Line

Overview
- Locale: Northumberland, North East England

History
- Opened: 1850
- Successor: North Eastern Railway
- Closed: 1968

Technical
- Line length: 2 3/4 miles (4.4 km)
- Track gauge: 4 ft 8 1/2 in (1,435 mm) standard gauge

The Alnwick branch line is a partly closed railway line in Northumberland, northern England. A heritage railway currently operates along one mile of the line, which originally ran from Alnmouth railway station, on the East Coast Main Line, to the town of Alnwick, a distance of 2 3/4 miles (4.4 km).

== History ==
The line opened on 5 August 1850, both to freight and passenger traffic. Passenger operations included direct Newcastle to Alnwick services, as well as regular shuttle runs between Alnmouth and Alnwick. As late as 1966, some of the Alnmouth to Alnwick shuttles were still operated by steam locomotives.

=== Operation ===
All Newcastle-Alnwick services and some local trains were taken over by diesel multiple unit trains from 21 April 1958, with schedules cut by up to 15 minutes.

=== Closure ===
The passenger service was withdrawn in January 1968 and the line closed completely in October 1968, on cost grounds. The old railway embankment west of where the line crossed the A1 road now forms the rear boundary of some of the gardens on the Royal Oak Gardens residential development.

== Preservation and revival ==
Aln Valley Railway
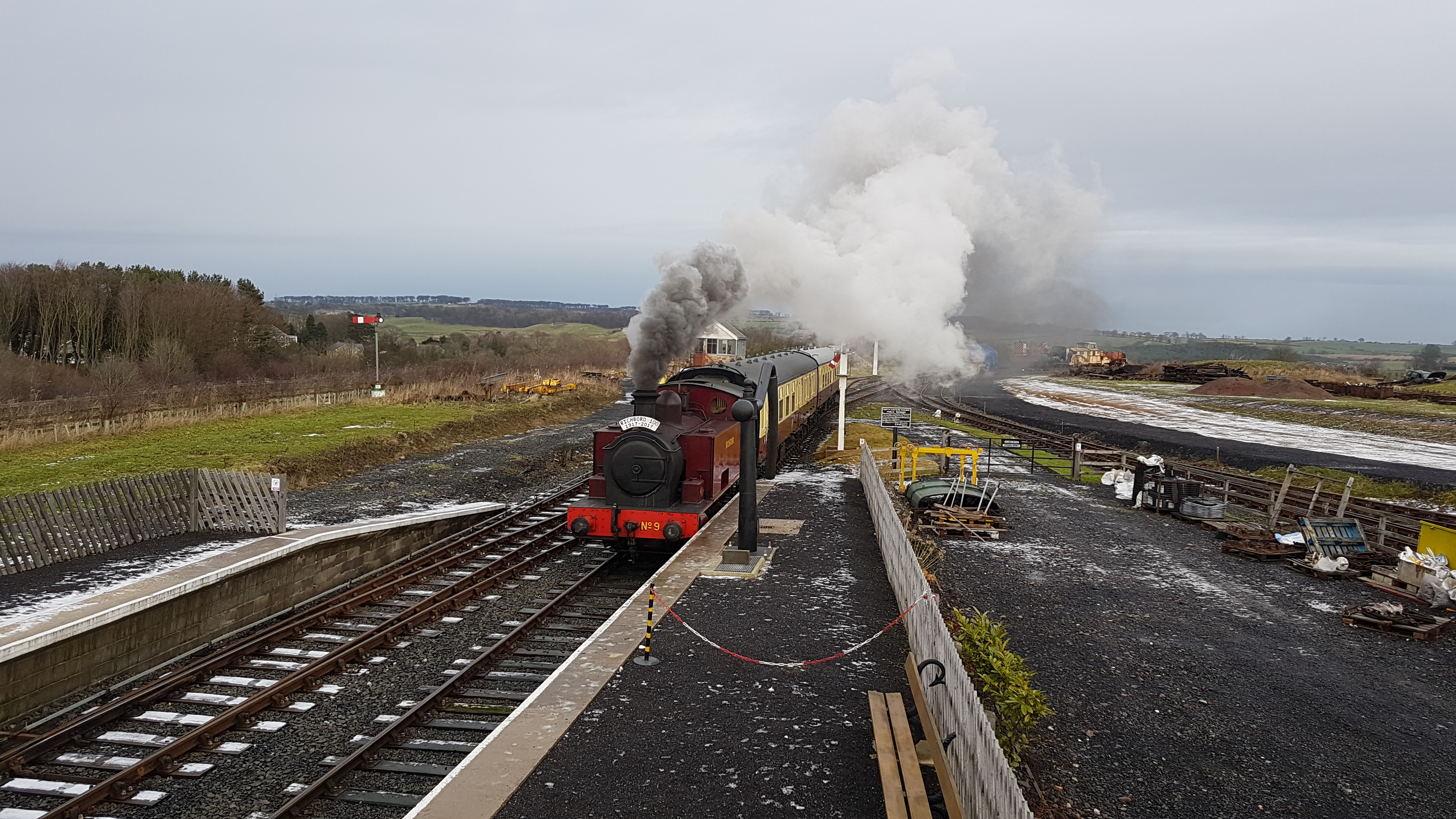
- Hudswell Clarke 0-6-0T no. 9 "Richboro", arriving into Alnwick Lionheart.
- Locale: Northumberland; North East England
- Terminus: Alnwick Lionheart

Commercial operations
- Name: Alnwick Branch Line
- Built by: York, Newcastle and Berwick Railway
- Original gauge: 4 ft 8 1/2 in (1,435 mm) standard gauge

Preserved operations
- Operated by: Aln Valley Railway Trust
- Stations: 2
- Length: 1.5 miles (2 km)
- Preserved gauge: 4 ft 8 1/2 in (1,435 mm) standard gauge

Commercial history
- Opened: 5 August 1850
- Closed: 29 January 1968

Preservation history
- 1995: Aln Valley Railway Society formed
- April 2000: Aln Valley Railway takes up residence at Longhoughton Station Goods Yard
- 1 July 2010: Planning permission granted for new Alnwick Lionheart station and reopened railway to Edenhill Bridge
- 27 February 2012: Construction of Alnwick Lionheart station begins
- 28 March 2013: Passenger rides begin
- 30 October 2013: Alnwick Lionheart station officially opened
- 28 December 2017: Passenger trains return to the original trackbed
- Headquarters: Alnwick Lionheart

The Aln Valley Railway is a heritage railway based on the Alnwick Branch Line. Reconstruction of the railway is an ongoing project; the intention is to reopen the old branch line from the newly completed Alnwick Lionheart terminus station in Alnwick to Alnmouth station. The original station is Alnwick is not used due to it being unavailable and there being new buildings on some of the trackbed into the town centre.

At present, the railway carries passengers for approximately 1.5 miles (2 km) from the new Lionheart station along a 1.2 mile section of the original route to a temporary terminus station at Edenhill Bridge. The railway project is managed by the Aln Valley Railway Trust (AVRT), a registered charity.

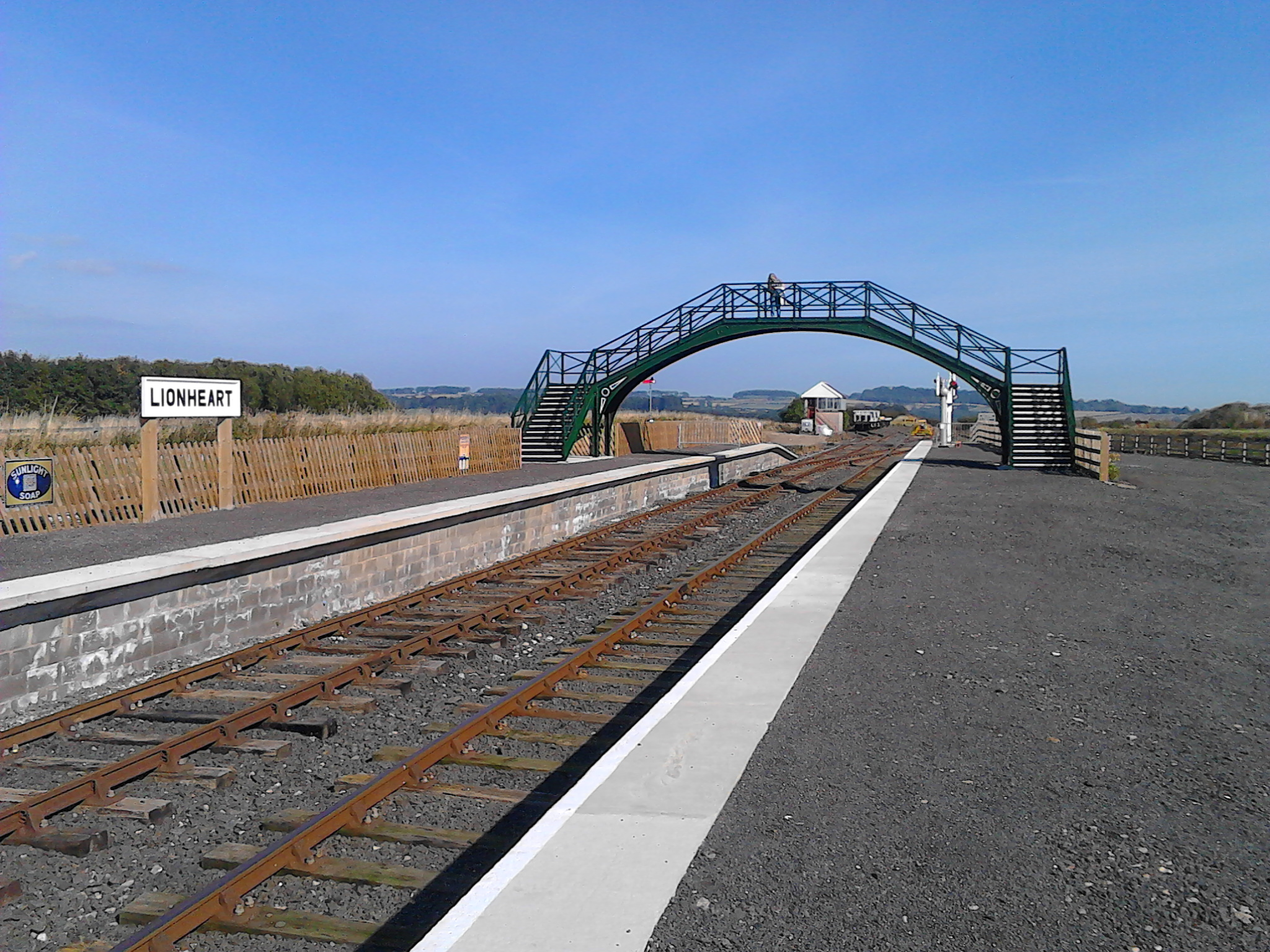
The new built Alnwick Lionheart terminus of the Aln Valley Railway. The A1 Alnwick bypass passes the site in a cutting immediately beyond the far boundary fence, 27 September 2015

The project first emerged with the foundation of the Aln Valley Railway Society (since merged into the Aln Valley Railway Trust) in 1995 and plans were announced in 1997 to reopen almost the entire length of the original branch line. However, this proposal would have required the construction of a costly bridge over the A1 dual carriageway bypass on the edge of Alnwick (and was later hindered further by the construction of a Lidl supermarket on the approach to the original station) and so plans were later revised and it was instead decided that a new station should be built on a site close to where the later A1 bypass truncated the original line.

Between April 2000 and November 2014, the Aln Valley Railway also had a presence at Longhoughton goods yard, where rolling stock and other items were temporarily stored and prepared for eventual movement to the Lionheart site, once it became available.

Planning permission was granted by Northumberland County Council on 1 July 2010 and the lease for the site signed on 22 February 2012. The site first opened to visitors five months later on 14 July, but only to demonstrate the ongoing work alongside exhibits of rolling stock as well as an indoor exhibition area, café, souvenir shop and model railway; the first train (an engineer's train) did not run until 3 November 2012. Passengers were first carried 28 March 2013 using the railway's Wickham trolley, a service which continued throughout the 2013 season. Later that year, on 10 September, the first trial steam service was operated (though not for public passengers) and the railway was formally opened by the Duke of Northumberland on 30 October 2013.

The first preserved steam service

Following the virtual completion of the initial plans for Lionheart station, the railway began works to extend the line onto the original trackbed of the Alnwick Branch Line in October 2015; this passed the site in a cutting and thus had to be partially raised so as to allow trains to gradually descend from the station. On 28 December 2017, a public passenger train from Lionheart station ran along a section of the original branch line for the first time since the line closed nearly 50 years previously. From August 2018, passenger trains regularly ran the short distance from Lionheart station to Alndyke Farm Crossing, just beyond Bridge 6.

In July 2018, the AVRT was awarded a Rural Development Programme for England grant (using funds jointly provided by the European Agricultural Fund for Rural Development and by the Department for Environment, Food and Rural Affairs) together with 20% match funding from Sustrans which constitute a total of £146,600. The grant has been used to cover the costs of groundworks and track materials to extend the running line over the Cawledge Viaduct to a point just before the line passes under Edenhill Bridge, and has also covered the costs of constructing a new station at this location, Greenrigg Halt, together with a run-round loop. A railway coach – BG No. 31407 – is being used to provide facilities for the new station, which is almost complete (2021).

Though it remains the goal of the AVRT to reopen the rest of the line through to Alnmouth, for it to continue beyond Edenhill Bridge, it must obtain a Transport and Works Act Order. Further planning permission will also be required and a lease will have to be negotiated with Network Rail for the final section of the former line into Alnmouth station, which ran alongside the East Coast Main Line.

== Rolling stock ==
=== Steam locomotives ===
- Hudswell Clarke 0-6-0T no. 9 Richboro, built in 1917. Operational.
- Hawthorn Leslie 0-4-0ST no. 3799 Penicuik, built in 1935. Stored undercover at Lionheart. At present, the locomotive is privately owned and the AVR are not permitted to restore it.
- Hunslet Austerity 0-6-0ST no. 60, built in 1948. Works number 3686. Built for the National Coal Board with cab and bunker cut down to a smaller loading gauge for working the Lambton Drops, a coal staith in Sunderland. Operational and on long-term loan (private owner)
- Hunslet Austerity 0-6-0ST no. 48, built in 1943. Works number 2864. War Department 75015. Stored undercover at Lionheart.
- Hudswell Clarke 0-6-0T no. 20 Jennifer, built 1942. Works no. 1731. Operational and on long-term loan (private owner)

=== Diesel locomotives ===
- Drewry 0-6-0DM no. 8199 Drax, built in 1963. Operational.
- Andrew Barclay 0-6-0 no. 615, built in 1977. Operational and on loan from Tanfield Railway (private owner). This was the final surface locomotive to work for the National Coal Board.
- British Rail Class 11 0-6-0 no. 12088 Shirley, built in 1951. Operational. In a BR black livery.
- Ruston and Hornsby 0-4-0 no. S518256, built in 1948. Pending major restoration.

=== Diesel multiple units ===
- Class 144, no. 144004, introduced in December 1986. Moved to the Aln Valley Railway 15 December 2020. Formerly in service with Northern Trains. Vehicles 55804 (DMS), 55827 (DMSL).
- Class 144, no. 144016, introduced in March 1987. Moved to the Aln Valley Railway 16 and 17 December 2020. Formerly in service with Northern Trains. Vehicles 55816 (DMS), 55852 (MS), 55839 (DMSL).

== Coordinates ==
Point	Coordinates
Western end – Alnwick railway station	55°24′36″N 1°41′56″W
Approx. midpoint	55°24′02″N 1°40′17″W
Lionheart railway station complex	55°24′08″N 1°41′11″W
Eastern end – Alnmouth railway station	55°23′47″N 1°38′28″W
