= Acklington railway station =

Railway station in Northumberland, England

Acklington
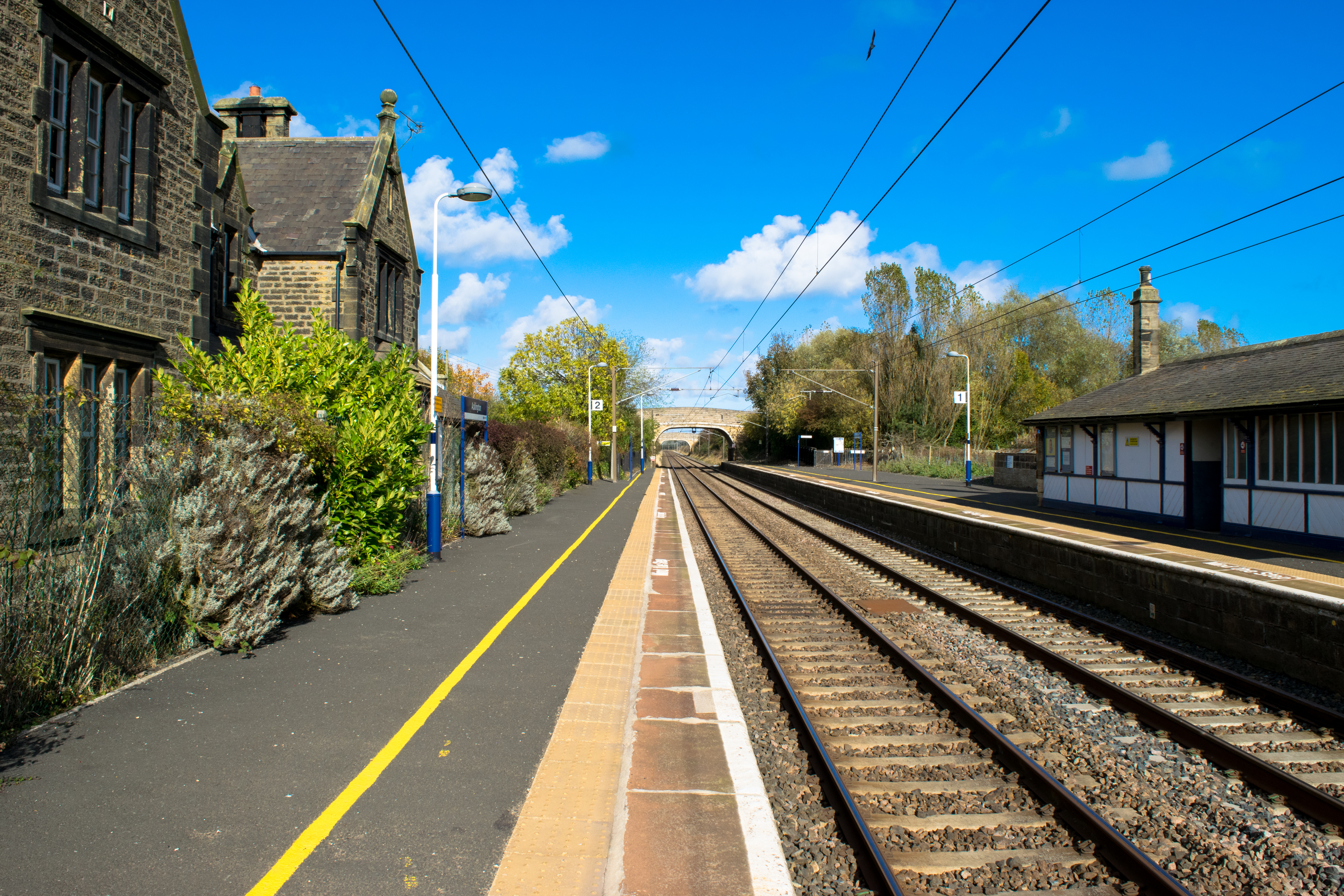

General information
- Location: Acklington, Northumberland; England
- Coordinates: 55°18′26″N 1°39′06″W
- Grid reference: NU222015
- Owner: Network Rail
- Manager: Northern Trains
- Platforms: 2

Other information
- Station code: ACK
- Classification: DfT category F2

History
- Opened: 1 July 1847
- Original company: Newcastle and Berwick Railway
- Pre-grouping: North Eastern Railway
- Post-grouping: London and North Eastern Railway; British Rail (North Eastern Region)

Passengers
- 2021/22: ▲324
- 2022/23: ▲434
- 2023/24: ▲550
- 2024/25: ▲856
- 2025/26: ▲1,206
Location
- Location within Northumberland
Notes
- Passenger statistics from the Office of Rail and Road

Acklington is a railway station on the East Coast Main Line, which runs between London King's Cross and Edinburgh Waverley. The station, situated 28 miles 43 chains (28.5 mi; 45.9 km) north of Newcastle, serves the small village of Acklington in Northumberland, England. It is owned by Network Rail and managed by Northern Trains. During 2024/25, it was the least used station in Northumberland, with an estimated 856 passenger journeys (entries and exits) made.

== History ==
The station was opened on 1 July 1847 by the Newcastle and Berwick Railway. It later joined the North Eastern Railway, becoming part of the London and North Eastern Railway during the Grouping of 1923. The line then passed on to the North Eastern Region of British Railways on nationalisation in 1948.

When Sectorisation was introduced, the station was served by Regional Railways until the Privatisation of British Railways. Intercity Sector trains passed through on the East Coast Main Line.

The station has a substantial main building on the northbound side, which is Grade-II listed and now used as a private residence. It also had a goods yard and signal box. The station avoided the Beeching Axe in the late 1960s that claimed several others on the East Coast Main Line and until the late 1980s had through trains to Berwick-upon-Tweed and Edinburgh Waverley (though only 3-4 per day each way in total). Electrification of the ECML and a rolling stock shortage led to the timetable being cut to the present residual level in 1991.

== Facilities ==
The station is unstaffed (so tickets must be purchased in advance or on the train) and only has basic amenities - a sizeable stone shelter and payphone on the southbound platform and a cycle rack on the northbound side. Step-free access is available to both platforms.

== Passenger volume ==
Passenger Volume at Acklington
| | 2019-20 | 2020-21 | 2021-22 | 2022-23 | 2023-24 | 2024-25 |
|---|---|---|---|---|---|---|
| Entries and exits | 246 | 66 | 324 | 434 | 550 | 856 |

== Services ==
As of the December 2025 timetable change, the station is currently served by just three trains per day: two southbound to Newcastle via Morpeth (one in the early morning and one in the evening) and one northbound to Chathill (in the evening).

No services call at the station on Sundays.

Rolling stock used: Class 156 Super Sprinter and Class 158 Express Sprinter

| Preceding station | National Rail | Following station |
|---|---|---|
| Widdrington | Northern Trains East Coast Main Line Limited Service | Alnmouth |
| | Historical railways | |
| Chevington | North Eastern Railway York, Newcastle and Berwick Railway | Warkworth |

== Sources ==
- Butt, R. V. J. (October 1995). The Directory of Railway Stations: details every public and private passenger station, halt, platform and stopping place, past and present (1st ed.). Sparkford: Patrick Stephens Ltd. ISBN 978-1-85260-508-7. OCLC 60251199. OL 11956311M.
- Jowett, Alan (2000). Jowett's Nationalised Railway Atlas (1st ed.). Penryn, Cornwall: Atlantic Transport Publishers. ISBN 978-0-906899-99-1. OCLC 228266687.
- Jowett, Alan (March 1989). Jowett's Railway Atlas of Great Britain and Ireland: From Pre-Grouping to the Present Day (1st ed.). Sparkford: Patrick Stephens Ltd. ISBN 978-1-85260-086-0. OCLC 22311137.
