= Bilton, Northumberland =

Hamlet in Northumberland, England

Coordinates: 55.388°N 1.646°W

Bilton
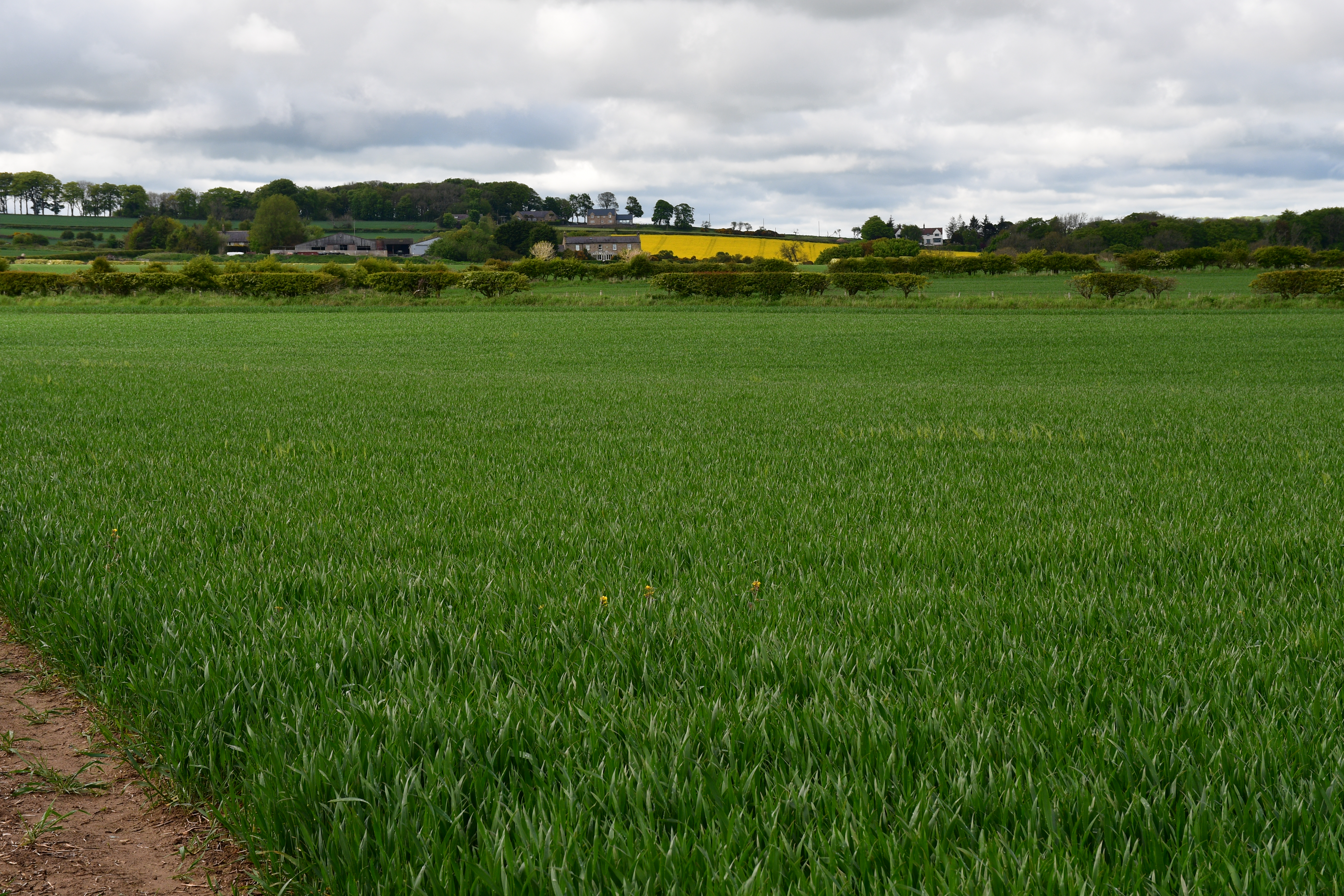

- Location within Northumberland
- OS grid reference: NU225105
- Civil parish: Lesbury
- Unitary authority: Northumberland
- Shire county: Northumberland
- Region: North East
- Country: England
- Sovereign state: United Kingdom
- Post town: ALNWICK
- Postcode district: NE66
- Dialling code: 01665
- Police: Northumbria
- Fire: Northumberland
- Ambulance: North East
- UK Parliament: Berwick-upon-Tweed

Bilton is a hamlet in the civil parish of Lesbury, Northumberland, in England. It is situated near the River Aln, a short distance inland from the North Sea coast, close to Alnmouth. Alnwick is the nearest town.

== History ==
During medieval times Bilton was larger; it is recorded as having 8 taxpayers in 1296 and had become a more substantial village by the 18th century. However, the village shrank in the 19th century, when several farms were amalgamated.[1] Bilton was primarily an agricultural village; 17th century field systems are shown on a map of 1624. Coal mining is also recorded on Bilton Common in the 17th century.[2] Bilton is close to Hipsburn, and the location of Alnmouth railway station. In 1870-72 it had a population of 121.

== Governance ==
Bilton is in the parliamentary constituency of Berwick-upon-Tweed.
