= Chathill =

Village in Northumberland, England

Coordinates: 55.532°N 1.708°W

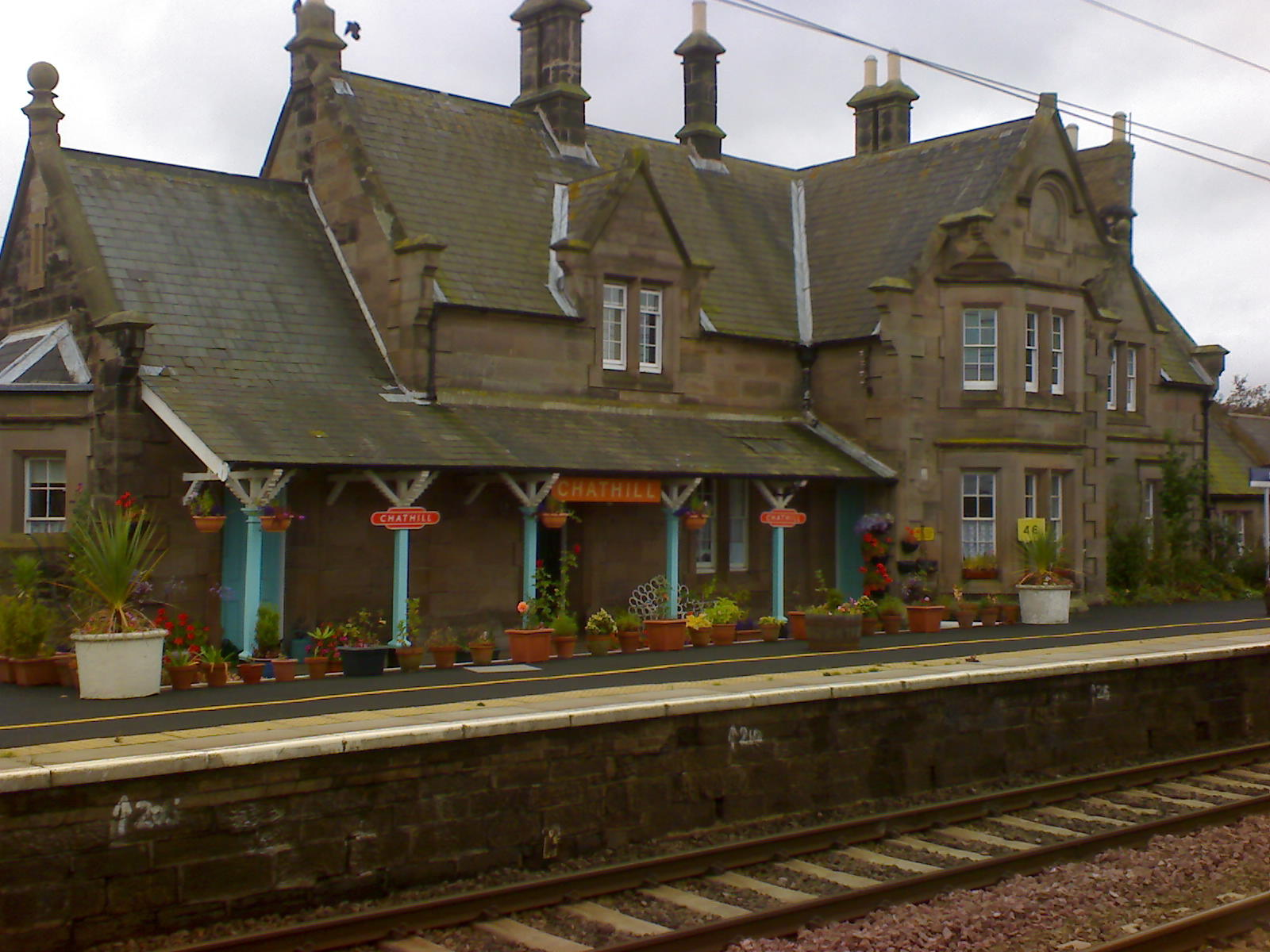
- Chathill Railway Station

- Location within Northumberland
- OS grid reference: NU185265
- Civil parish: Ellingham
- Unitary authority: Northumberland
- Ceremonial county: Northumberland
- Region: North East
- Country: England
- Sovereign state: United Kingdom
- Post town: CHATHILL
- Postcode district: NE67
- Dialling code: 01665
- Police: Northumbria
- Fire: Northumberland
- Ambulance: North East
- UK Parliament: North Northumberland

Chathill is a hamlet in the civil parish of Ellingham, in Northumberland, England. It is about 9 miles (14 km) north of Alnwick and 3 miles (5 km) inland from the North Sea coast. It is served by Chathill railway station. It is on the main road serving Seahouses and the northern coast.

Chathill is home to Preston Pele Tower, built between 1392 and 1399. One of its former owners was Sir Guiscard Harbottle of Beamish, who was killed at the Battle of Flodden. The tower has a clock, installed in 1864, which features mechanisms similar to Big Ben.

== Governance ==
Chathill is in the parliamentary constituency of Berwick-upon-Tweed. Chathill was formerly a township in Ellingham parish, from 1866 Chathill was a civil parish in its own right until it was abolished on 1 April 1955 and merged with Ellingham. In 1951 the parish had a population of 59.
