= Alnmouth railway station =

Railway station in Northumberland, England

Alnmouth Alnmouth for Alnwick

General information
- Location: Alnmouth, Northumberland; England
- Coordinates: 55°23′34″N 1°38′12″W
- Grid reference: NU230110
- Owner: Network Rail
- Manager: Northern Trains
- Platforms: 2

Other information
- Station code: ALM
- Classification: DfT category E

History
- Original company: York, Newcastle and Berwick Railway
- Pre-grouping: North Eastern Railway
- Post-grouping: London and North Eastern Railway; British Rail (North Eastern Region)

Key dates
- 1 July 1847: Opened as Bilton
- 2 May 1892: Renamed Alnmouth
- 23 May 2003: Renamed Alnmouth for Alnwick

Passengers
- 2020/21: ▼61,222
- 2021/22: ▲0.286 million
- 2022/23: ▲0.331 million
- 2023/24: ▲0.353 million
- 2024/25: ▲0.379 million
- Interchange: 149
Location
- Location within Northumberland
Notes
- Passenger statistics from the Office of Rail and Road

Alnmouth railway station (also known and signposted as Alnmouth for Alnwick) serves the coastal and rural villages of Alnmouth, Hipsburn, Lesbury, and Bilton, and the market town of Alnwick, in Northumberland, England. It lies 34 mi 69 chains (34.9 mi; 56.1 km) north of Newcastle on the East Coast Main Line, which runs between London King's Cross and Edinburgh Waverley. It is owned by Network Rail and managed by Northern Trains.

== History ==
The station was opened on 1 July 1847 as Bilton by the Newcastle and Berwick Railway; from 1854, it was operated by the North Eastern Railway (NER). On 19 August 1850, it became the junction for the Alnwick branch line and was significantly upgraded by the NER in 1887–88. On 2 May 1892, the station's name was changed to Alnmouth.

It became part of the London and North Eastern Railway during the Grouping of 1923. The station then passed to the North Eastern Region of British Railways upon nationalisation in 1948. The Alnwick branch service was withdrawn in January 1968, with goods traffic ending in October the same year.

The station had an additional platform face on the 'down' (northbound) side for use by branch trains, but the track and buildings were lifted in the early 1970s after the branch was closed; this was removed altogether prior to the station being refurbished in 2004. The main building on the southbound platform is not original; it was erected in 1987 to replace the original structures constructed when the Alnwick branch opened in 1850.

When sectorisation was introduced, the station formed part of the InterCity sector until the privatisation of British Rail.

== Facilities ==
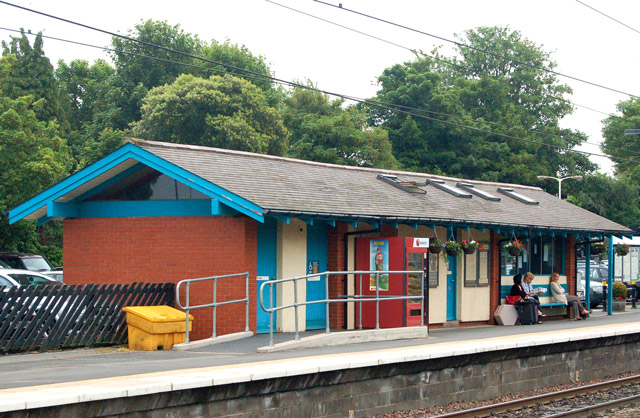
The station buildings

The station is staffed, with the ticket office on platform 1 open every day of the week (06:40-18:15 Mon-Sat, 10:20-21:30 Sundays). A self-service ticket machine is also provided (this can be used to collect pre-paid tickets as well as for use when the booking office is closed). There is a waiting shelter and help point on platform 2, with a waiting room, vending machine and toilets on platform 1. Level access is available to both platforms via lifts in the footbridge. Train running information is offered via automated announcements, a passenger information system and timetable posters.

== Services ==
The station is served by four train operating companies, which provide the following general service in trains per hour/day (tph/tpd):

London North Eastern Railway

- 1 tp2h to London King's Cross, via Newcastle, Darlington, York, Doncaster, Newark Northgate and Peterborough
- 1 tp2h to Edinburgh Waverley.

CrossCountry

- 1 tp2h to Plymouth, via Newcastle, Leeds, Birmingham New Street and Bristol Temple Meads; of which:
  - 1 tpd extends to Penzance
- 1 tp2h to Edinburgh Waverley; of which:
  - 1 tpd extends to Glasgow Central, via Motherwell.

TransPennine Express

- 8 tpd to Edinburgh Waverley, calling at Berwick-upon-Tweed, Reston, Dunbar and East Linton
- 8 tpd to Newcastle, calling at Morpeth.

Northern Trains

- 2 tpd to Chathill
- 2 tpd to Newcastle.

The Aln Valley heritage railway has long-term ambitions of extending its running line to Alnmouth station from its current terminus at Greenrigg Halt.

Preceding station	National Rail	Following station
Morpeth or Newcastle	CrossCountry Cross Country Route	Berwick-upon-Tweed or Edinburgh Waverley
Morpeth or Newcastle	London North Eastern Railway East Coast Main Line	Berwick-upon-Tweed or Edinburgh Waverley
Morpeth	TransPennine Express North TransPennine	Berwick-upon-Tweed
Acklington	Northern Trains East Coast Main Line Limited Service	Chathill
	Historical railways	
Warkworth Line open, station closed	York, Newcastle and Berwick Railway	Lesbury Line open, station closed
Terminus	North Eastern Railway Alnwick branch line	Alnwick Line and station closed
