= Little Mill railway station =

Disused railway station in Northumberland, England

Little Mill
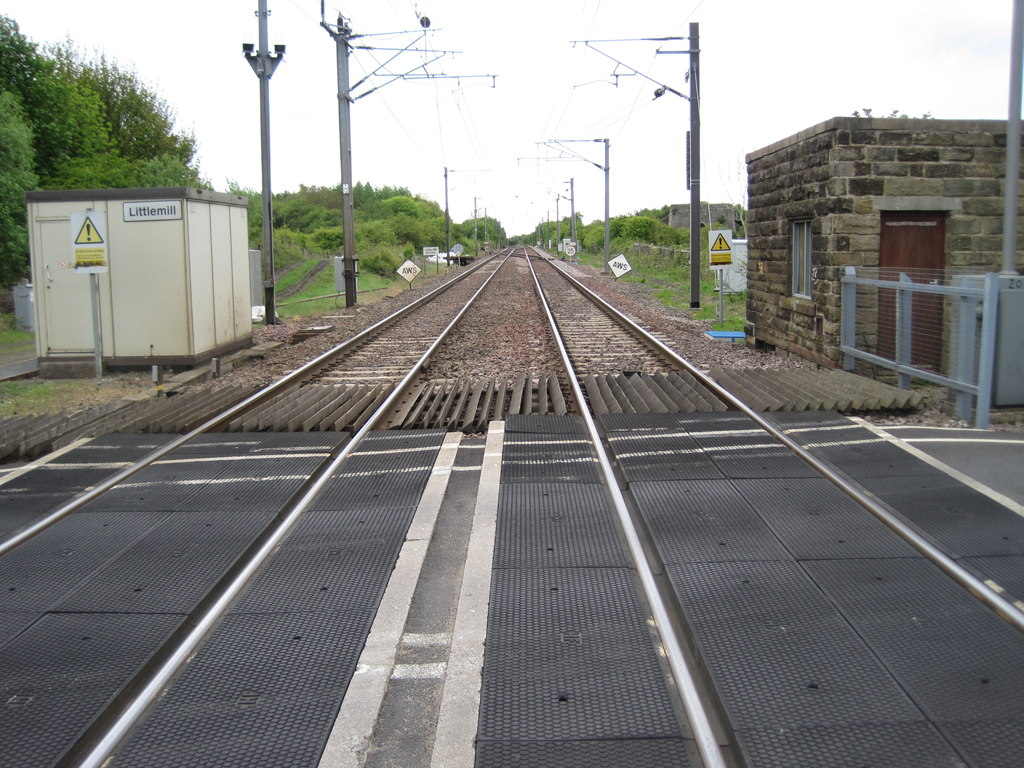
- The site of the station in 2010

General information
- Location: Little Mill, Northumberland; England
- Coordinates: 55.4526°N 1.6426°W
- Grid reference: NU227177
- Platforms: 2

Other information
- Status: Disused

History
- Original company: York, Newcastle and Berwick Railway
- Pre-grouping: North Eastern Railway
- Post-grouping: LNER; British Rail (North Eastern)

Key dates
- 1 July 1847: Privately opened
- 1 January 1861: Publicly opened
- 5 May 1941: Closed to passengers
- 7 October 1946: Reopened
- 15 September 1958: Closed to passengers again
- 7 June 1965: Closed completely
Location

Little Mill railway station served the hamlet of Little Mill, Northumberland, England from 1847 to 1965 on the East Coast Main Line.

== History ==
The station opened on 1 July 1847 by the York, Newcastle and Berwick Railway as a private station for the Grey family. The station was planned to have passed through their private land at Howick Hall. Charles, Earl Grey protested to the engineer, because he did not want the family's private land to be violated. So the station was rerouted to the west and eventually opened. By then, Earl Grey had died and so his son, Henry, was the one to enjoy the privileges of the private station. It opened to the public in January 1861. The station took its name from the neighbouring farmstead Littlemill. There were sidings that served a lime kiln and the whinstone quarry. Little Mill was one of the stations that closed due to the second world war on 5 May 1941. The station reopened on 7 October 1946. After the reopening, there were only weekday services at first but Sunday services were resumed in October 1947. The station closed to passengers on 15 September 1958 and closed for goods on 7 June 1965.

Preceding station	Historical railways	Following station
Longhoughton; Line open, station closed	York, Newcastle and Berwick Railway; East Coast Main Line	Christon Bank; Line open, station closed
