= Lesbury railway station =

Short-lived railway station in Northumberland, England

Lesbury
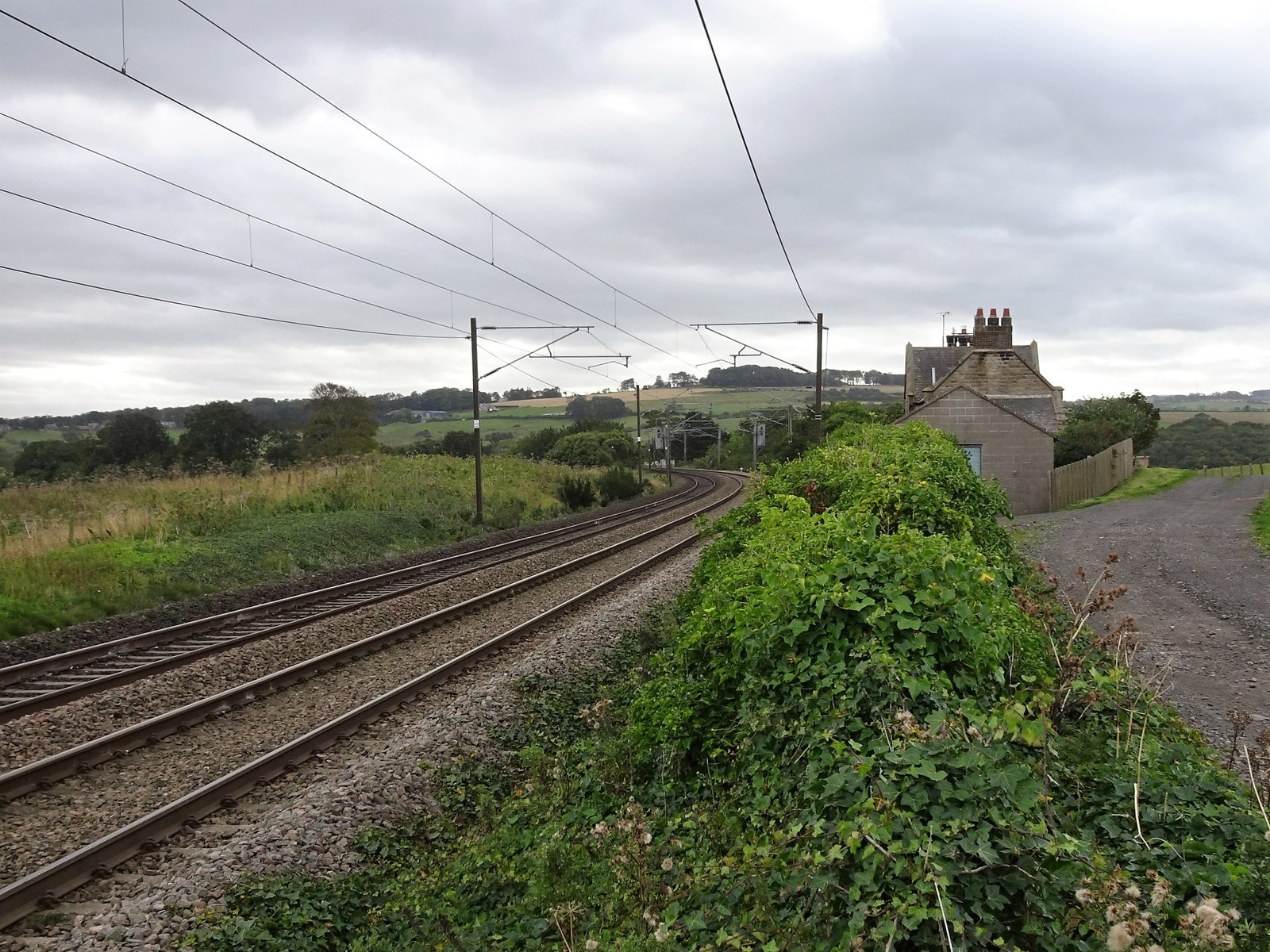
- Remains of Lesbury railway station

General information
- Location: Lesbury, Northumberland; England
- Coordinates: 55.4063°N 1.6375°W
- Grid reference: NU230125
- Platforms: 2

Other information
- Status: Disused

History
- Original company: Newcastle and Berwick Railway

Key dates
- 1 July 1847: Opened
- 1 October 1850: Closed
Location

Lesbury railway station served the village of Lesbury, Northumberland, England from 1847 to 1850 on the East Coast Main Line.

== History ==
The station was opened on 1 July 1847 by the Newcastle and Berwick Railway. The station was situated 400 yards along a track that ran north from the Alnwick–Warkworth road, now the A1068. The station was very short-lived and closed, after three years, on 1 October 1850, due to the opening of Bilton station, now known as Alnmouth station. The site was converted into two houses for railway workers.

Preceding station	Historical railways	Following station
Alnmouth; Line and station open	York, Newcastle and Berwick Railway; East Coast Main Line	Longhoughton; Line open, station closed
