= Longhoughton railway station =

Disused railway station in Northumberland, England

Longhoughton
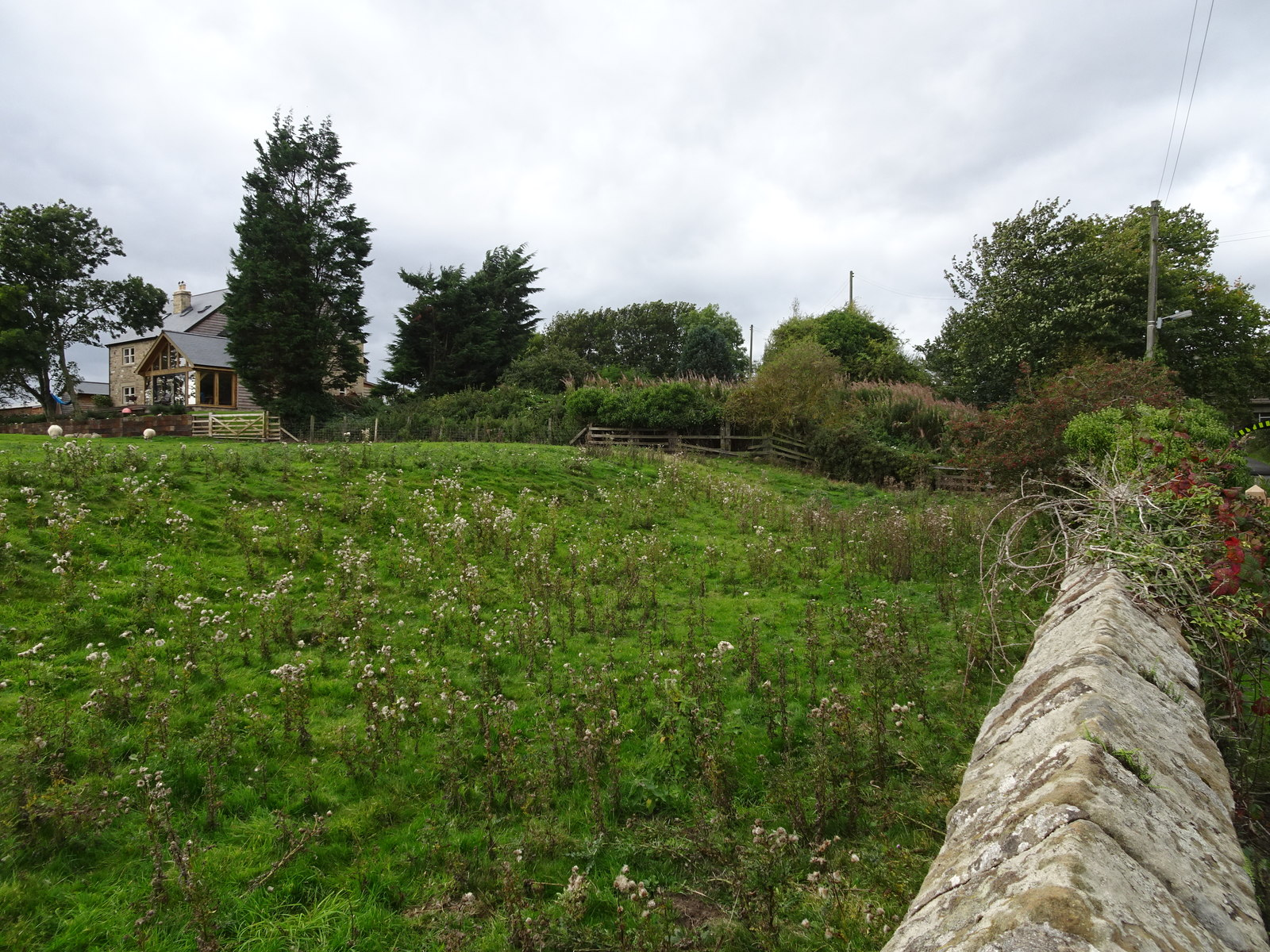
- The site of the station, looking east, in 2018

General information
- Location: Longhoughton, Northumberland; England
- Coordinates: 55.427462°N 1.622257°W
- Grid reference: NU240149
- Platforms: 2

Other information
- Status: Disused

History
- Original company: York, Newcastle and Berwick Railway
- Pre-grouping: North Eastern Railway
- Post-grouping: LNER; British Rail (North Eastern)

Key dates
- 1 July 1847: Opened
- 5 May 1941: Closed to passengers
- 7 October 1946: Reopened
- 18 June 1962: Closed to passengers again
- 4 June 1963: Closed completely
Location

Longhoughton railway station served the village of Longhoughton, Northumberland, England from 1847 to 1963 on the East Coast Main Line.

== History ==
The station was opened on 1 June 1847 by the York, Newcastle and Berwick Railway. The station was situated south of the railway bridge over Station Road. The goods facilities were situated southeast of the up passenger platform, served by all five of the sidings. Longhoughton was one of the stations to close during the Second World War on 5 May 1941, although it was used as an RAF training base during its closure in 1943. The station was reopened on 7 October 1946. Longhoughton station survived while ten other stations closed in 1958 due to its convenience for RAF personnel. It later closed to passengers again on 18 June 1962 and was supposedly closed to all traffic on the same day, although an excursion ran on 3 June 1963. This was the last train to serve Longhoughton station.

Preceding station	Historical railways	Following station
Lesbury; Line open, station closed	York, Newcastle and Berwick Railway; East Coast Main Line	Little Mill; Line open, station closed
