= Warkworth railway station =

Disused railway station in Northumberland, England

Warkworth
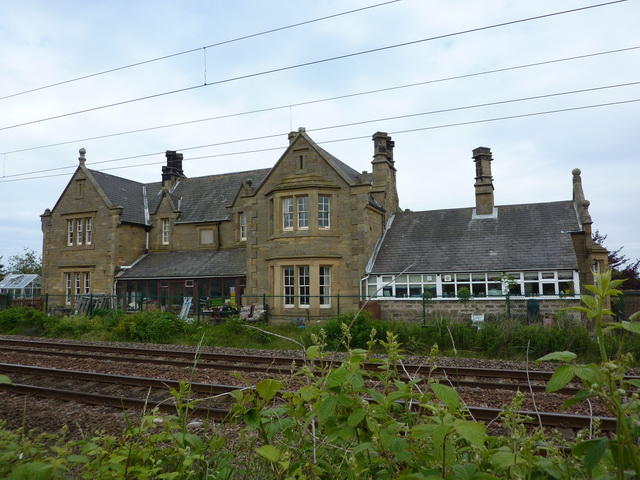

General information
- Location: Warkworth, Northumberland; England
- Coordinates: 55.3538°N 1.634°W
- Grid reference: NU233067
- Platforms: 2

Other information
- Status: Disused

History
- Original company: York, Newcastle and Berwick Railway
- Pre-grouping: North Eastern Railway
- Post-grouping: LNER; British Rail (North Eastern)

Key dates
- 1 July 1847: Opened
- 15 September 1958: Closed to passengers
- 2 April 1962: Closed completely
Location

Warkworth railway station served the village of Warkworth, Northumberland, England, from 1847 to 1962 on the East Coast Main Line.

== History ==
The station was opened on 1 July 1847 by the York, Newcastle and Berwick Railway. Benjamin Green was the station's architect. It was situated north of the Station Road level crossing near Houndean Mill, between Warkworth and the hamlet of Eastfield. Two sidings served the coal depot south of the up passenger platform while the goods shed was to the north, also on the up side. Two sidings south of the down side passenger platform served the cattle dock. Warkworth was one of the stations to remain open from 1941 to 1946. In 1951, only 1,023 tickets were sold in the year, an average of three a day.

Warkworth eventually closed to passengers on 15 September 1958 and closed totally after goods traffic stopped on 2 April 1962. The station house still stands as a Grade II Listed Building, currently a private accommodation. There have been proposals to reopen the station.

Preceding station	Historical railways	Following station
Acklington; Line and station open	North Eastern Railway; York, Newcastle and Berwick Railway	Alnmouth; Line and station open
