= Seahouses =

Village in Northumberland, England

Coordinates: 55°34′59″N 1°39′18″W

- Village
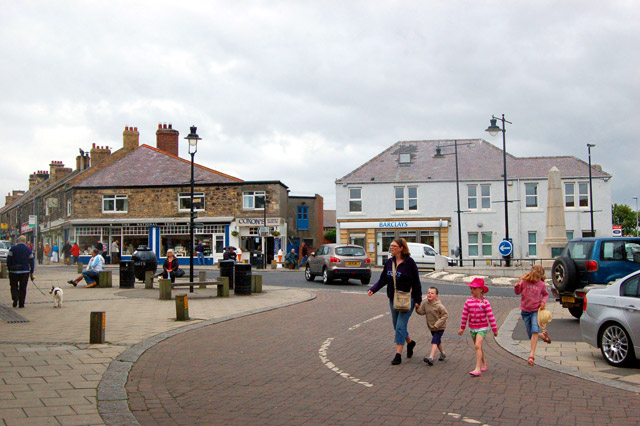
- Seahouses

- Location within Northumberland
- Population: 1,803
- OS grid reference: NU2232
- Civil parish: North Sunderland
- Unitary authority: Northumberland
- Ceremonial county: Northumberland
- Region: North East
- Country: England
- Sovereign state: United Kingdom
- Post town: SEAHOUSES
- Postcode district: NE68
- Dialling code: 01665
- Police: Northumbria
- Fire: Northumberland
- Ambulance: North East
- UK Parliament: North Northumberland

Seahouses is a large village on the Northumberland coast in England. It is about 20 kilometres (12 mi) north of Alnwick, within the Northumberland Coast Area of Outstanding Natural Beauty.

== Attraction ==
Seahouses attracts many visitors, mainly from the northeast of England. National and international tourists also visit Seahouses while visiting the Northumberland National Park, the Northumberland Coast, and the Farne Islands. Seahouses also has a working fishing port, which also serves the tourist trade, being the embarkation point for visits to the Farne Islands. From shops in the town and booths along the harbour, several boat companies operate, offering various visitor packages. These may include landing on at least one Farne, seeing seals and seabirds, hearing a commentary on the islands and the Grace Darling story, or scuba diving on the many Farne Islands wrecks. Grace Darling's brother is buried in the cemetery at North Sunderland. He died in 1903, aged 84. The current Seahouses lifeboat bears the name Grace Darling.

The Seahouses Festival is an annual cultural event which began in 1999 as a small sea shanty festival and has since developed into a broader cultural celebration attracting visitors from across the region.

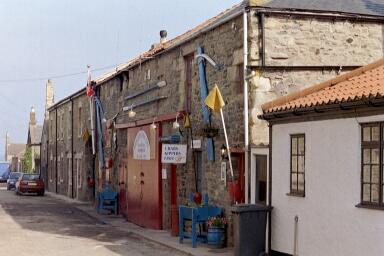
The fish processing factory in Seahouses is one of the places where the practice of kippering herrings is said to have originated

There are local claims that kippers were first created in Seahouses in the 1800s, and they are still produced locally to this day.

Between 1898 and 1951, Seahouses was the north-eastern terminus of the North Sunderland Railway. Independent until its final closure, it formed a standard gauge rail link between the village and Chathill Station on the East Coast Main Line. The site of Seahouses station is now the town car park and the trackbed between village and North Sunderland is a public footpath.

== Governance ==
Seahouses is within the civil parish of North Sunderland and the Northumberland County Council electoral division of Bamburgh. The parliamentary constituency is North Northumberland, represented by David Smith MP of the Labour Party.

== Religion ==
Seahouses is in the archdeaconry of Lindisfarne, in the Diocese of Newcastle.

== Transport ==
Buses are run by Borders buses and Arriva Northumbria.

== See also ==
- Bradford Kames, a Site of Special Scientific Interest 3.5 miles (5.6 km) west of Seahouses
- Craster kipper
