= Lesbury =

Village in Northumberland, England

Coordinates: 55.3990°N 1.6265°W

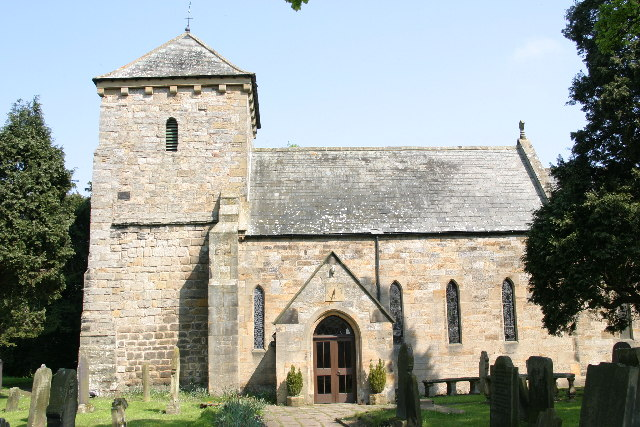
- St Mary's Church

- Location within Northumberland
- Population: 1,043 (2021 census)
- OS grid reference: NU236117
- Shire county: Northumberland
- Region: North East
- Country: England
- Sovereign state: United Kingdom
- Post town: ALNWICK
- Postcode district: NE66
- Police: Northumbria
- Fire: Northumberland
- Ambulance: North East
- UK Parliament: North Northumberland

Lesbury is a small rural village in Northumberland, England. It is built on the main coastal road, 3.5 miles (5.6 km) south-east of Alnwick, on the north bank of the river Aln. Alnmouth railway station, on the East Coast Main Line, lies about half a mile away.

== History ==
The Anglican Church of St Mary was mentioned in records dating back to 1147, and those from the end of the 13th century state that there were 13 residents eligible to pay tax. Robert de Emeldon, later Lord Treasurer of Ireland, was parish priest of Lesbury in the 1320s.

In the 18th century, a schoolroom and master's house were built, paid for by Algernon Percy, 4th Duke of Northumberland. By 1897, the village had a large corn mill, as well as a reading room with 500 volumes in the library.

The name Lesbury is derived from Laece Burg; the town of the leech or physician.

The church, originally Norman, was restored by Anthony Salvin in 1846. It has a square 13th-century tower with a pyramidal roof and a lofty arch on round columns. The 13th-century chancel has a 15th-century roof, with oak beams decorated at intervals with little carvings of foliage. The heavy eight-sided font, boldly carved with the Percy locket and crescent, is of about the same age.

In the south wall of the nave are three lancet windows in memory of Sir Henry Hall Scott, founder of the Imperial Yeomanry of South Africa, and his son, Captain George Hall Scott, who fell at the Battle of the Somme; they are the work of the A.K. Nicholson studios. The central lights show Joan of Arc and St George standing above graphic representations of the siege of Orleans and the capture of the village of Montauban by the British and French in 1916.

The glass in the west window is in memory of George Bray, vicar from 1908 to 1934. An earlier vicar was Percival Stockdale, a writer of some reputation, who died here in 1811 and was buried at Cornhill on Tweed. Lesbury's most notable parson was Patrick Mackilwyan, who has a place in Thomas Fuller's Worthies of England. He started off by insisting on having his tithes in kind, but settled down with his parishioners and won their regard by visiting the sick in their tents on the moor during the Plague of 1665, although he was then 97. He died there at 101, declaring that "Of friends and books, good and few are best."

== Governance ==
An electoral ward in the same name exists. It contains some of Alnwick with a total population taken at the 2011 Census of 5,069.
