= Chathill railway station =

Railway station in Northumberland, England

Chathill
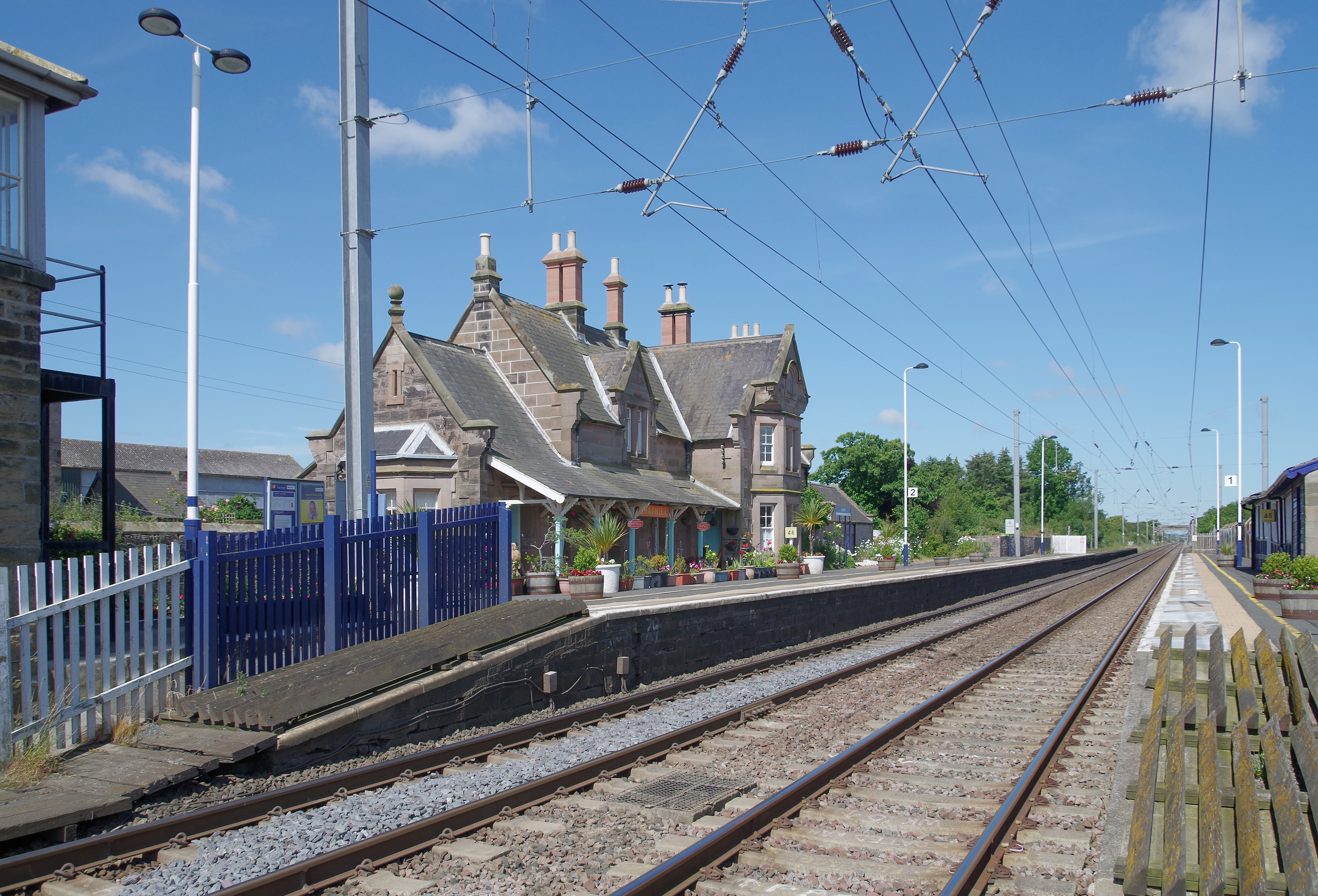

General information
- Location: Chathill, Northumberland; England
- Coordinates: 55°32′12″N 1°42′24″W
- Grid reference: NU186270
- Owner: Network Rail
- Manager: Northern Trains
- Platforms: 2

Other information
- Station code: CHT
- Classification: DfT category F2

History
- Original company: Newcastle and Berwick Railway
- Pre-grouping: North Eastern Railway
- Post-grouping: London and North Eastern Railway; British Rail (North Eastern Region)

Key dates
- 29 March 1847: Opened

Passengers
- 2021/22: ▲1,492
- 2022/23: ▼1,348
- 2023/24: ▼1,264
- 2024/25: ▲1,580
- 2025/26: ▲2,306
Location
- Location within Northumberland
Notes
- Passenger statistics from the Office of Rail and Road

Chathill is a railway station on the East Coast Main Line, which runs between London King's Cross and Edinburgh Waverley. The station, situated 46 miles 1 chain (46.0 mi; 74.0 km) north of Newcastle, serves the hamlet of Chathill, and surrounding coastal villages of Beadnell and Seahouses in Northumberland, England. It is owned by Network Rail and managed by Northern Trains.

== History ==
The station was opened by the Newcastle and Berwick Railway on 29 March 1847. At the time of opening, four passenger trains ran each way every weekday between Newcastle and Morpeth, and between Chathill and Tweedmouth. Road coaches filled in the gaps for the time being, and a four-hour transit from Newcastle to Berwick-upon-Tweed was achieved.

Between 1 August 1898 and 27 October 1951, the station served as the south-western terminus of the North Sunderland Railway, which ran between Chathill and the fishing village of Seahouses. The railway operated independently, until takeover by the London and North Eastern Railway in 1939.

An average of 3 or 4 stopping services each way per day ran between Newcastle and Edinburgh Waverley via Berwick-upon-Tweed until the late 1980s. Following the electrification of the East Coast Main Line, these services were curtailed at Berwick-upon-Tweed. Services were further reduced to their current level by British Rail in May 1991, due to a shortage of rolling stock.

Owing to the limited service (two trains per day towards Morpeth and Newcastle), an easement permits passengers travelling north towards Berwick-upon-Tweed and Scotland to double back via Alnmouth for Alnwick. The local rail user group SENRUG has been campaigning since September 2016 to have local services on the corridor between Newcastle and Edinburgh Waverley increased, to offer more choice for commuters and offer leisure opportunities for visitors to locations such as Lindisfarne and St Cuthbert's Way.

The station has retained its 1847 Grade II listed building, designed by Newcastle architect Benjamin Green, and the signal box dating from around 1873 (extended at the north end about 1911) on the northbound platform, though neither is in operational use. The station house is now privately owned and the signal box houses signalling equipment on the ground floor and staff accommodation on the first floor.

== Facilities ==
The station is unstaffed and has no ticket facilities, so intending passengers must buy tickets on the train or prior to travel. There is a large stone waiting shelter on the southbound platform, but there are no other amenities other than information posters on each side. Step-free access is available to both platforms.

Two (possibly modern reproduction types) B.R. North Eastern Region Tangerine Orange Totem signs are provided on the northbound platform 2, as well as a rectangular "CHATHILL" sign, also in Tangerine Orange, fitted below the station platform canopy.

These may have been provided by the building owner rather than being original B.R. era signs.

Normal modern Northern Rail signage is also provided on both platforms as well.

Although the Northbound Platform 2 is open to passengers and maintained for safe use, only the single morning terminating train uses it to set down passengers, and no other northbound services have called here since B.R. withdrew the local locomotive–hauled semi–fast service in 1991.

== Services ==
Services at Chathill are operated by Northern Trains using Class 156 and 158 DMUs.

The station is currently served by two trains per day (one in the early morning and one in the evening) to Newcastle via Morpeth.

No services call at the station on Sundays.

Preceding station	National Rail	Following station
Alnmouth	Northern Trains East Coast Main Line Limited Service	Terminus
	Historical railways	
Alnmouth	British Rail Eastern Region East Coast Main Line	Berwick-upon-Tweed
Terminus	London and North Eastern Railway North Sunderland Railway	North Sunderland
Fallodon	York, Newcastle and Berwick Railway East Coast Main Line	Newham

== Sources ==
- Wright, A., (1988), The North Sunderland Railway, The Oakwood Press, Locomotion Papers No. 36, ISBN 0-85361-335-4
