= Beadnell =

Village and civil parish in Northumberland, England

Coordinates: 55.557°N 1.635°W

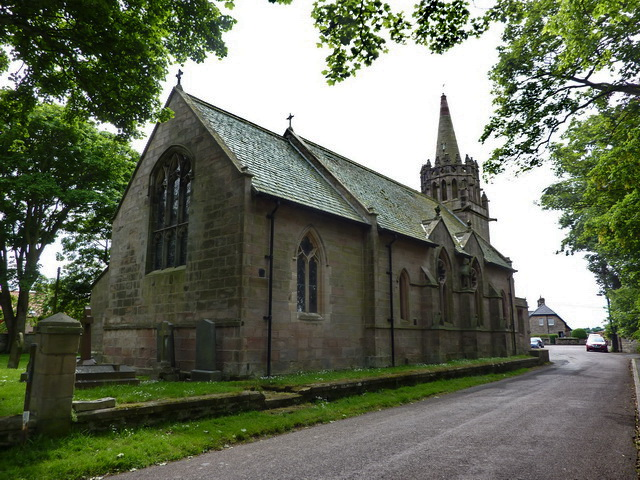
- St. Ebba's Church, Beadnell

- Location within Northumberland
- Population: 546 (2011)
- OS grid reference: NU230293
- Civil parish: Beadnell
- Unitary authority: Northumberland
- Ceremonial county: Northumberland
- Region: North East
- Country: England
- Sovereign state: United Kingdom
- Post town: CHATHILL
- Postcode district: NE67
- Dialling code: 01665
- Police: Northumbria
- Fire: Northumberland
- Ambulance: North East
- UK Parliament: North Northumberland

Beadnell is a village and civil parish in Northumberland, England. It is situated about 4 miles (6.4 km) south-east of Bamburgh, on the North Sea coast, and has a population of 528(2001), increasing to 545 at the 2011 Census. It takes its name from the Anglo Saxon "Bede's Hall". The earliest written reference is found in 1161.

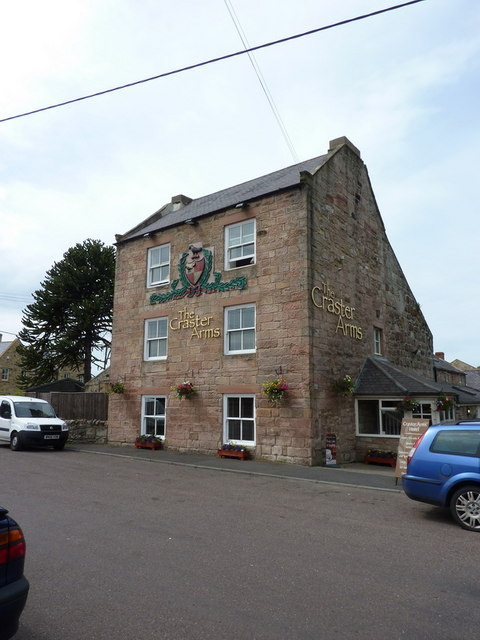
The Craster Arms

Containing the only west-facing harbour entrance on the east coast of England, Beadnell is a tourist base, the town consisting largely of holiday homes, with some small-scale fishing. Two large caravan sites neighbour the village, as well as a handful of campsites. The parish church is the Anglican Church of St. Ebba (named after Saint Æbbe the Elder, founder of abbeys and daughter of King Æthelfrith), built in the eighteenth century as a chapel and rebuilt in 1860. A sixteenth-century pele tower remains as part of the public house, The Craster Arms.

Near the harbour are historic limekilns dating from 1747, which were later used for curing herring. They are now owned by the National Trust. Beadnell is within the North Northumberland Heritage Coast and the Northumberland Coast Area of Outstanding Natural Beauty. Beadnell Bay, a sandy beach stretching 2 miles (3.2 km) to the south, contains a nationally important colony of little tern and the largest mainland colony of Arctic tern in the United Kingdom. The beach was awarded the Blue Flag rural beach award in 2005.

In the summer months, the village generally attracts holiday makers and people from the caravan site which shuts down at the end of October.

There was a horse race meeting held at Beadnell in the 18th century but by 1840 it had moved to nearby Belford.

In 1902, a clock was installed at St Ebba's church to mark the coronation of Edward VII.

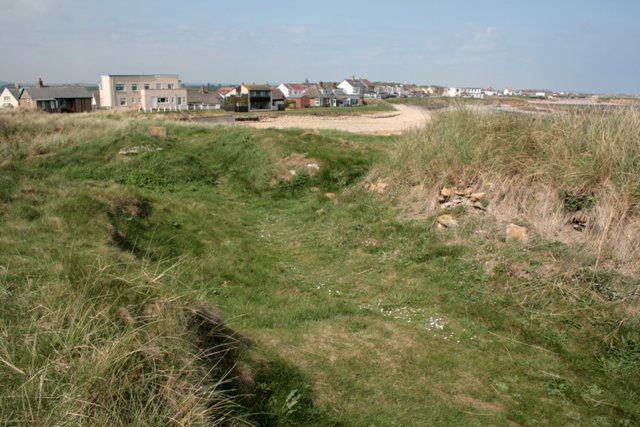
The site of an ancient chapel at Ebb's Nook, Beadnell, excavated by Time Team in 2012

In 2012, Time Team archeologists visited Beadnell to investigate the site of the medieval chapel of St Ebba at Ebb's Nook, Beadnell, which was originally built in 660.

== In popular culture ==
Beadnell was referred to as Bedehal in The Saxon Stories by Bernard Cornwell.

== Sources ==
- Allsopp, Bruce; Clark, Ursula (1969). Historic Architecture of Northumberland. Newcastle upon Tyne: Oriel Press. ISBN 0 85362 062 8.
