= Barrow Meadow =

Site of Special Scientific Interest in Northumberland, England

- Site of Special Scientific Interest
- Location within Northumberland
- Location of Barrow Meadow.
- Area of search: Northumberland
- Grid reference: NT915062
- Coordinates: 55.34924°N 2.13497°W
- Interest: Biological
- Area: 4.9 hectares (12 acres)
- Notification date: 1989
- Location map: DEFRA MAGIC map

Barrow Meadow is a Site of Special Scientific Interest (SSSI) in north Northumberland, England. The site is a species-rich hay meadow of a sort now rare in Northumberland.

== Location and natural features ==
Barrow Meadow is a field 4.9 hectares (12 acres) in area in the north-east of England in the county of Northumberland, some 0.4 miles (0.64 km) west-south-west of the village of Alwinton. The meadow is situated on flat land between the River Coquet and a southern tributary, the Barrow Burn, at their confluence some 150 metres (490 ft) above sea level. The surrounding terrain is hilly moorland.

The meadow is judged to be species-rich in comparison with fields managed using contemporary farming methods involving the use of artificial fertilisers and reseeding. Aules Hill Meadows in the south-west and Barrow Burn Meadows in the north of the county are similarly protected hay meadows.

== Vegetation ==
Barrow Meadow is a northern hay meadow characterised by the presence of a rich diversity of grasses, and an abundance of herbs. Grass species found at the site include sweet vernal-grass (Anthoxanthum odoratum), crested dog's-tail (Cynosurus cristatus), red fescue (Festuca rubra) and quaking grass (Briza media). Forbs include pignut (Conopodium majus), eyebright (Euphrasia agg.), meadow vetchling (Lathyrus pratensis), common knapweed (Centaurea nigra) and several species of lady's mantle (Alchemilla glabra), (A. xanthochlora) and (A. filicaulis).

Other species found at the site include wood crane's-bill (Geranium sylvaticum), meadowsweet (Filipendula ulmaria), changing forget-me-not (Myosotis discolor), fairy flax (Linum catharticum), field wood-rush (Luzula campestris), betony (Stachys officinalis) and northern marsh-orchid (Dactylorhiza purpurella), as well as legumes, including meadow vetchling, bitter vetch (Lathyrus montanus), lesser trefoil (Trifolium dubium), red clover (T. pratense), white clover (T. repens), common and greater bird's-foot trefoils (Lotus corniculatus) and (L. uliginosus).

The condition of Barrow Meadow was judged to be favourable in 2012.

== Land ownership ==
Part of the land area designated as Barrow Meadow SSSI is owned by the Ministry of Defence

== See also ==
- List of Sites of Special Scientific Interest in Northumberland
