= Barrow Burn Meadows =

Site of Special Scientific Interest in north Northumberland, England

- Site of Special Scientific Interest
- Location within Northumberland
- Location of Barrow Burn Meadows.
- Area of search: Northumberland
- Grid reference: NT867110
- Coordinates: 55.39229°N 2.21182°W
- Interest: Biological
- Area: 5.4 hectares (13 acres)
- Notification date: 1988
- Location map: DEFRA MAGIC map

Barrow Burn Meadows is a Site of Special Scientific Interest (SSSI) in north Northumberland, England. The site is a species-rich hay meadow of a sort now rare in Northumberland.

== Location and natural features ==
Barrow Burn Meadows are two fields 5.4 hectares (13 acres) in area in the north-east of England in the county of Northumberland, some 2.7 miles (4.3 km) south of the Anglo-Scottish border and 4.5 miles (7.2 km) north-west of the village of Alwinton. The meadows are on the south-west facing slope of a hill on the north bank of the upper River Coquet, rising from 250 metres (820 ft) to 280 metres (920 ft) above sea level. The surrounding terrain is hilly moorland.

The meadows are judged to be species-rich in comparison with fields managed using contemporary farming methods involving the use of artificial fertilisers and reseeding. Aules Hill Meadows in the south-west and Barrow Meadow in the north of the county are similarly protected hay meadows.

== Vegetation ==
Barrow Burn Meadows is a northern hay meadow characterised by the presence of a rich diversity of grasses, and an abundance of herbs. Species found at the site include sweet vernal-grass (Anthoxanthum odoratum), crested dog's-tail (Cynosurus cristatus), red fescue (Festuca rubra) with tufted hair-grass (Deschampsia cespitosa), creeping bent (Agrostis stolonifera), Yorkshire fog (Holcus lanatus), yellow oat-grass (Trisetum flavescens) and wood crane's-bill (Geranium sylvaticum). Herb species include pignut (Conopodium majus), bitter vetch (Lathyrus montanus), meadow vetchling (L. pratensis), rough and autumn hawkbit (Leontodon hispidus) and (L. autumnalis), cat's-ear (Hypochoeris radicata), selfheal (Prunella vulgaris), common bird's-foot trefoil (Lotus corniculatus), yellow rattle (Rhinanthus minor), changing forget-me-not (Myosotis discolor), common knapweed (Centaurea nigra) and oxeye daisy (Leucanthemum vulgare).

The southern of the two fields provides a habitat for smooth, hairy and intermediate lady's mantle (Alchemilla glabra, A. filicaulis and A. xanthochlora), whilst the northern field supports eyebright (Euphrasia agg.), quaking grass (Briza media) and melancholy thistle (Cirsium helenioides).

A poorly drained section of the northern field supports compact rush (Juncus conglomeratus) and several sedges including glaucous sedge (Carex flacca), common sedge (C. nigra), oval sedge (C. leporina (Note: C. leporina is often called by the nom. illeg. synonym Carex ovalis.)) and pale sedge (C. pallescens), with marsh marigold (Caltha palustris), ragged robin (Lychnis flos-cuculi), meadowsweet, greater bird's-foot trefoil (Lotus uliginosus) and common spotted-orchid (Dactylorhiza fuchsii).

The condition of one of the units of Barrow Burn Meadows was judged to be favourable in 2012; a second was judged in 2014 to be unfavourable-recovering, with concerns expressed about the observed herb to grass ratio.

== Land ownership ==
Part of the land area designated as Barrow Burn Meadows SSSI is owned by the Ministry of Defence.

== See also ==
- List of Sites of Special Scientific Interest in Northumberland
