= Grass Wood, Wharfedale =

Ancient woodland in North Yorkshire, England

Coordinates: 54.0851°N 2.0177°W

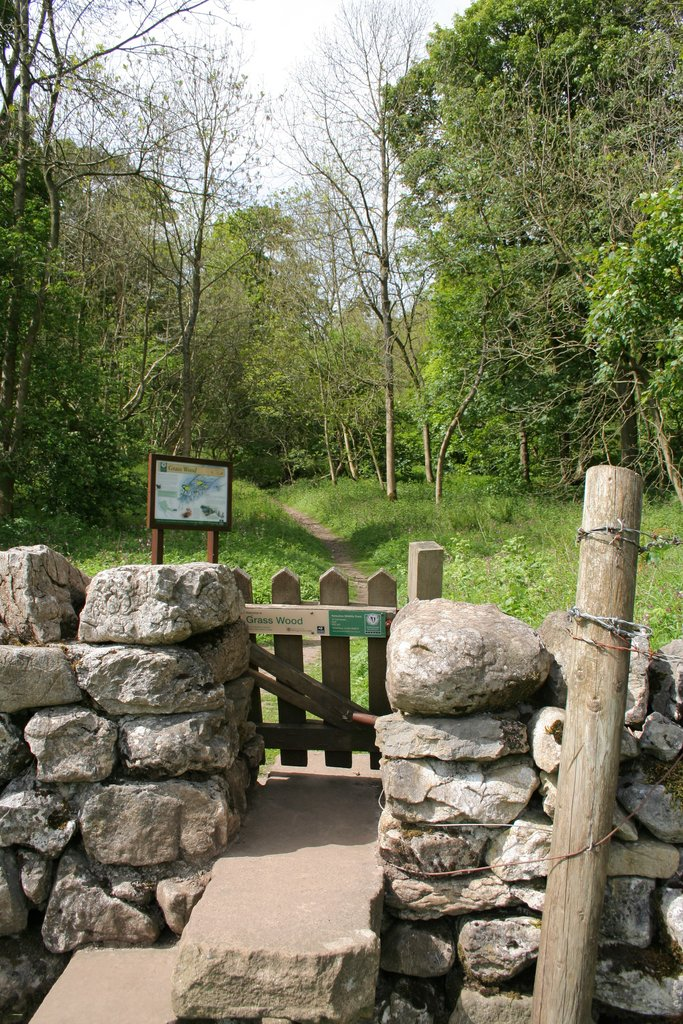
Stile into Grass Wood

Grass Wood is an ancient woodland of 88 hectares (220 acres) in Wharfedale, North Yorkshire, England, that has an exceptional ground flora of woodland wildflowers.

The area was notified as a Site of Special Scientific Interest in 1955 for upland broadleaved woodland. The site is also listed in A Nature Conservation Review under the entry for "Conistone Old Pasture and Bastow Wood".

The Yorkshire Wildlife Trust completed the purchase of the site in 1983 and manages it as a nature reserve. The whole of the area of the SSSI is registered common land.

Two adjacent sites Bastow Wood and Conistone Old Pasture are also notified as SSSIs, the former for broadleaved woodland and calcareous grassland, and the latter for calcareous grassland and limestone pavement.

Grass Wood is the last surviving native site in Britain for the Lady's Slipper Orchid (Cypripedium calceolus).

== Site description ==
Grass Wood is on the west and south-facing slopes of a Carboniferous Limestone spur in Upper Wharfedale, to the south of Conistone Moor. Rock outcrops, scree and limestone pavement areas occur throughout the wood, along with two significant scar precipices. The original woodland would have been ash Fraxinus excelsior dominating over the limestone soils, with Wych elm Ulmus glabra and oak probably Quercus petraea and with an understorey of hazel Corylus avellana.

Felling and replanting has altered the dominant woodland structure, extensively modifying its composition and making it a less natural woodland than the adjacent Bastow Wood. During the 19th century the lower slopes were interplanted with beech Fagus sylvatica and sycamore Acer pseudoplatanus, and in the 1960s the north-eastern part of the site was replanted with Norway spruce, European larch, Scots pine and beech.

A management objective now is to remove areas of non-native tree species and replant with broadleaves from local seed sources. As well as these areas cleared through selective felling, many areas of the woodland have the appearance of an early successional stage of advance natural regeneration through mainly saplings of ash, birch and sycamore, this enclosed within a variable canopy of ash, sycamore, beech, oak, and with some birch. Shrubs and small trees in the understorey include bird cherry Prunus padus, hazel, spindle Euonymus europaeus, buckthorn Rhamnus cathartica, wild privet Ligustrum vulgare, blackthorn Prunus spinosa and guelder-rose Viburnum opulus.

The underlying geology ensures that most of the site is well drained, favouring lime-loving plants – the calcicoles. There are, however, localised areas with poorer drainage and in which some lime-hating plants can be found – the calcifuges - such as bracken Pteridium aquilinum, as well as plants associated with water-logged conditions such as common valerian Valeriana officinalis and wild angelica Angelica sylvestris.

The floristic interest of Grass Wood is described and explained in a book by Sylvia Arnold on the wildflowers of the Yorkshire Dales, and there is a description of a wildflower walk that points out the location of particular wildflowers as the walk progresses around and through the wood.

The woodland is served by one public footpath, and as a registered commons is open access within its boundaries. There is however an extensive network of paths that have arisen through common usage over the years. It is a popular location for dog walkers, which often limits the chance of seeing the local roe deer feeding in the woodland.

== Botanical interest ==
An extensive remnant upland woodland area of this size is uncommon on limestone in the Yorkshire Dales, hence the notification of Grass Wood as a SSSI. The woodland element is unsettled and is atypical of its location—Bastow Wood is more settled since it has not been replanted - but the very rich ground flora of Grass Wood is characteristic of an ancient woodland on limestone. This floristic value owes its continuing existence to the continuity of the woodland cover, which gives it recognition as ancient woodland, but also because of the lack of sheep grazing in the wood that has evidently in the past cleared through the woodland ground flora of the adjacent Bastow Wood.

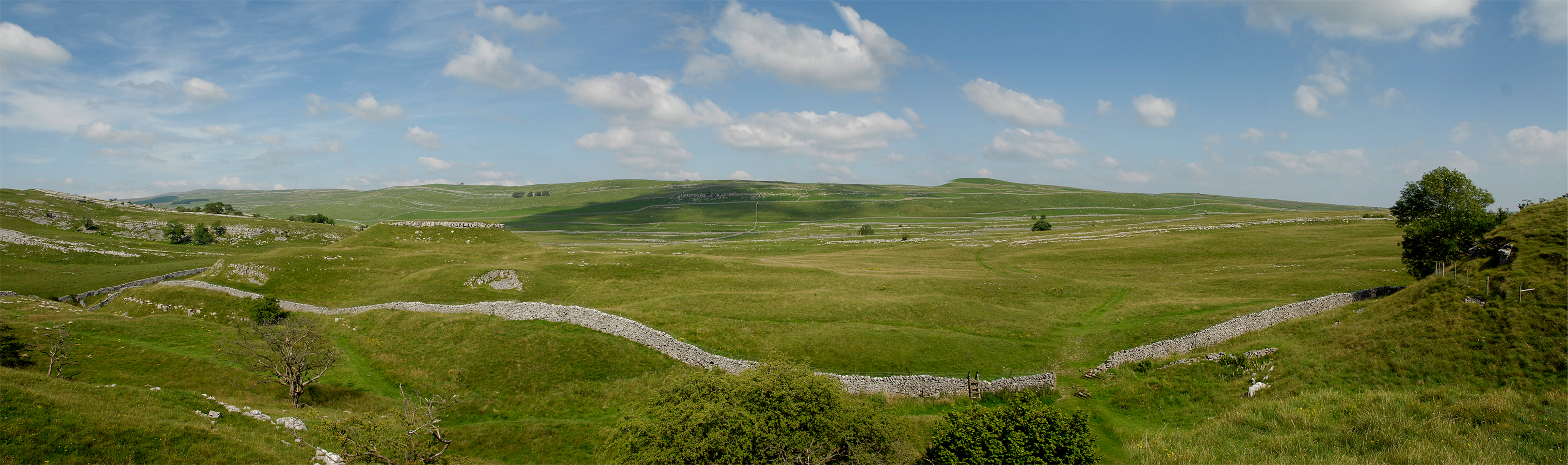
The view from Grass Wood eastwards towards the limestone pavements of Sweet Side

There is a good variety of vascular plants that are considered to be indicators of undisturbed, ancient woodland. These include Herb Paris (Paris quadrifolia), Lily-of-the-valley (Convallaria majalis), Ramsons (Allium ursinum), Wood Sorrel (Oxalis acetosella), Wood Anemone ((Anemone nemorosa), Dog's Mercury (Mercurialis perennis), Woodruff (Galium odoratum), and Wood-sedge (Carex sylvatica).

There is also an extraordinary range of geophytes, the plants that have bulbs or bulbous growths that make them especially adapted to woodland. These include the ancient woodland indicators of lily-of-the-valley, herb paris and ramsons, but also the uncommon in angular Solomon's-seal (Polygonatum odoratum) as well as the common in bluebells (Hyacinthoides non-scripta) and lord-and-ladies (Arum maculatum). The one patch of Solomon's-seal (Polygonatum multiflorum) is considered to be of garden origin.

Early-purple Orchid (Orchis mascula), another geophyte, is found under the lighter shade of sparser woodland cover in Grass Wood. This shows its ability to occupy a range of habitat since it is more often associated with open grassland, and can be seen in profusion in the nearby Conistone Old Pasture. The conditions in Grass Wood would also seem ideal for a rare and highly endangered orchid, the Lady's-slipper (Cypripedium calceolus) that is known historically to have grown in the limestone area of the Yorkshire Dales. It is found in continental Europe growing in the decomposed humus of semi-shaded woodland cover on limestone. While the virtual extinction of the Lady's-slipper orchid from its historical range is often blamed on uprooting by gardeners and botanists, it is also the case that its preferred habitat shrunk markedly with human clearance of woodland from the limestone landscape, and the grazing of sheep will have finished it off. It is to be hoped that the rescue plan for the Lady's-slipper orchid is successful, and that Grass Wood may eventually be chosen as one of the locations for its general re-introduction.

Other woodland species found in Grass Wood include Wild Strawberry (Fragaria vesca), Red Campion (Silene dioica), Wood Cranesbill (Geranium sylvaticum), Primrose (Primula vulgaris), Bugle (Ajuga reptans), St John's wort (Hypericum hirsutum), and a few Columbine (Aquilegia vulgaris) are found at woodland edges. There are scarce clumps of Stinking iris (Iris foetidissima) and of Stinking Hellebore (Helleborus foetidus). The grassland species of Lady's-mantle (Alchemilla glabra), Great Burnet (Sanguisorba officinalis), Melancholy Thistle (Cirsium helenioides) and Goldilocks Buttercup (Ranunculus auricomus) are found in clearings.

The open landscape species of dry, rocky calcareous grassland are also found in refuge in Grass Wood on the steep un-wooded scar edges of the limestone, especially along the sunlit areas of Dewbottom Scar. Here can be found the locally uncommon Rock Whitebeam (Sorbus rupicola) as well as Burnet Rose (Rosa pimpinellifolia), Common Rock-rose (Helianthemum nummularium), Bloody Crane's-bill (Geranium sanguineum), Salad-burnet (Sanguisorba minor), Wild Marjoram (Origanum vulgare) and Wild Thyme Thymus polytrichus.
