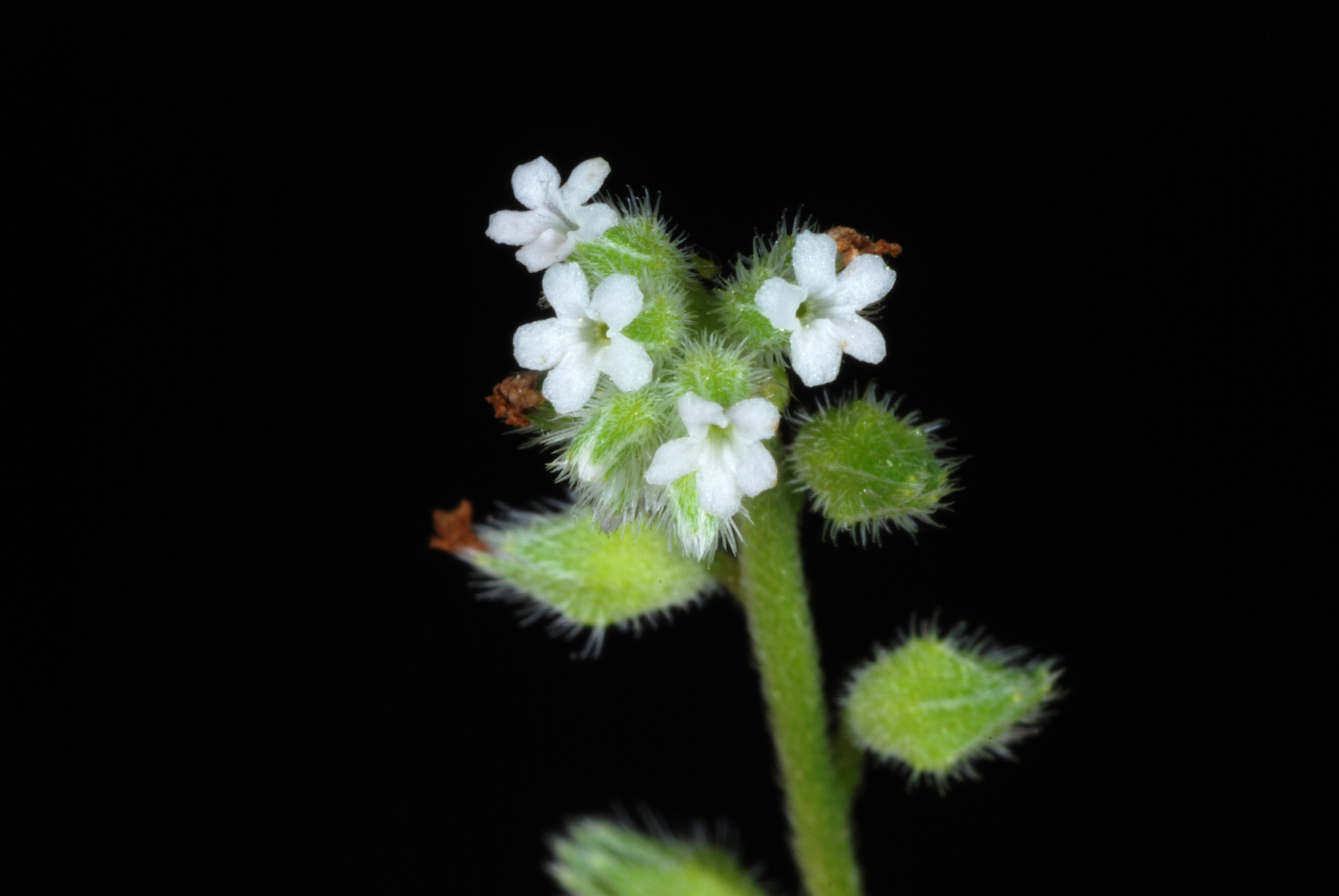
- Myosotis verna - Guilford County, NC, US. Image by Douglas Goldman

Scientific classification
- Kingdom: Plantae
- Clade: Tracheophytes
- Clade: Angiosperms
- Clade: Eudicots
- Clade: Asterids
- Order: Boraginales
- Family: Boraginaceae
- Genus: Myosotis
- Species: M. verna

Binomial name
- Myosotis verna Nutt.

= Myosotis verna =

Species of plant

Myosotis verna (common names: spring forget-me-not, early forget-me-not, early scorpion grass, spring scorpion grass, or white scorpion grass) is a herbaceous, annual or biennial plant in the family Boraginaceae. The native range of this species is Canada and the United States.

== Description ==
Myosotis verna is a low, herbaceous plant, reaching up to 40 cm in height. Leaves are alternate, simple and lanceolate. Each leaf has a prominent central vein. The lowest leaves wither away by flowering time. Stems are round in cross-section or angled, multiple and branched at the base or single, erect, few branched above, densely covered in fine, bristly hairs.

Flowers are inconspicuous, five-petaled and typically white, appearing at the ends of the stems. The calyx surrounding the base of the flower is about 6 mm long, twice as long as the flower stalk, with five lance-shaped lobes, three of the lobes longer than the other two, but shorter than the calyx tube. The floral tube is shorter than the calyx, causing the flower to take on a bell shape even when fully open. The calyx is thickly covered in spreading hairs, which may have hooked tips on the lower part.

Nutlets are egg-shaped, appearing in clusters of four, and are shiny, usually black, and measuring between 1.2 - 1.5 mm long, 1.1 - 1.2 mm wide.

This plant thrives in anthropogenic habitats, such as railways, roadsides and disturbed land, as well as in woodlands, dry scrubland, ledges and bluffs.

It flowers April to June, and fruits shortly after flowering.

Myosotis verna is most similar to M. macrosperma, but differs by having the fruit stalks diverging and further spaced apart, and the nutlets tend to be somewhat larger. Also similar are M. stricta and M. discolor, except that the flowers are blue in colour.
