= Chevdar =

Archeological site in Bulgaria

Chevdar is a Neolithic archeological site near Kazanluk in Bulgaria. An early Neolithic house was found that would have had wooden walls, marked by post holes. It was plastered with clay with the remains of a hearth also found. Carbonised seeds of emmer, barley and bitter vetch were found. These results were found using one of the earliest uses of flotation technology in archaeobotany.
