= Bitter vetch =

Bitter vetch is a common name for several plants and may refer to:

- Vicia ervilia, called bitter vetch or ervil, an ancient grain legume crop of the Mediterranean region.
- Vicia orobus, called wood-bitter vetch, a legume found in Atlantic areas of Europe.
- Lathyrus linifolius, called bitter vetch or heath pea, a species of pea.
- Lathyrus niger, called black bitter vetch or black pea, a perennial legume native to Europe.
