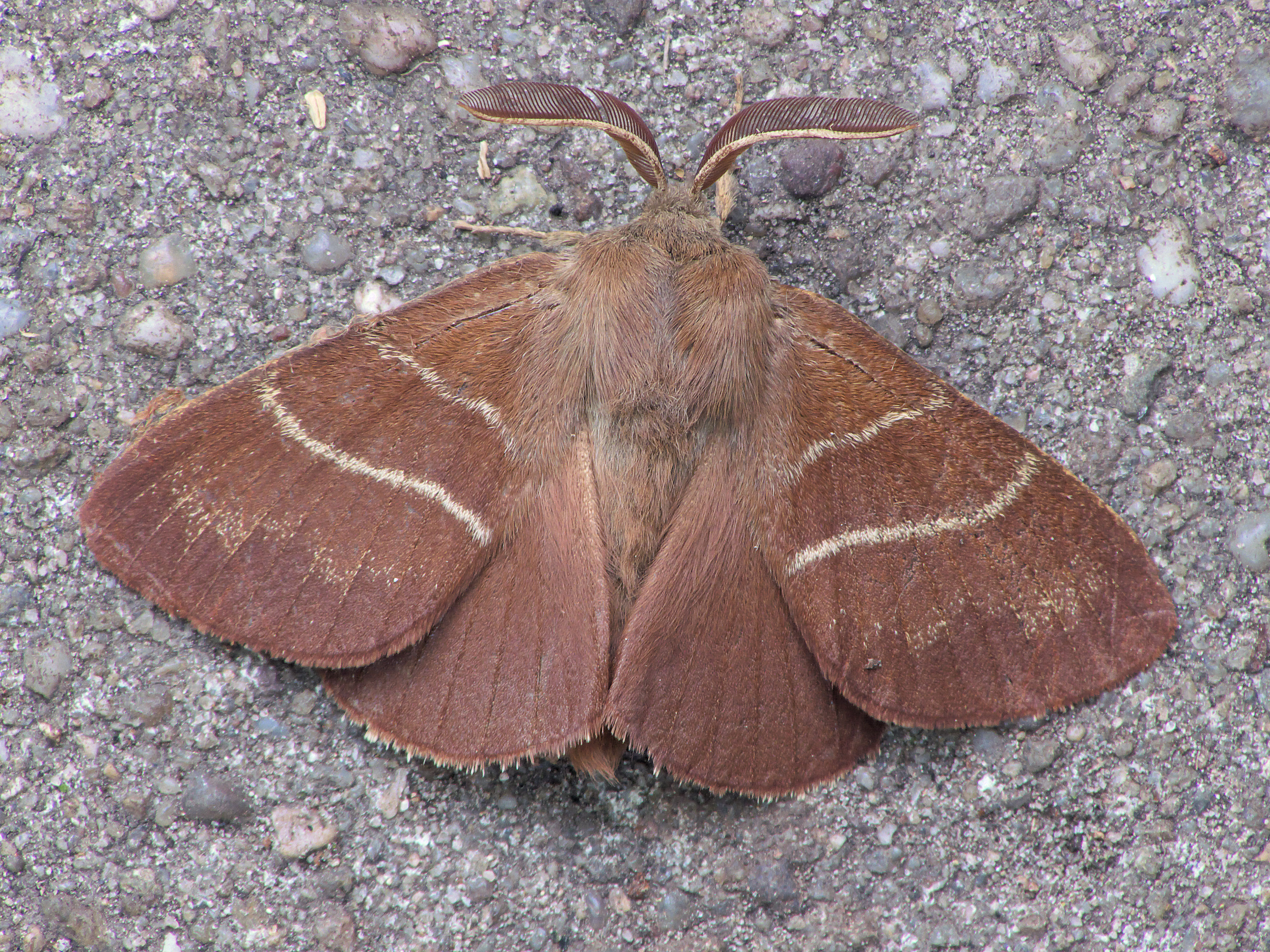
- Male

Scientific classification
- Kingdom: Animalia
- Phylum: Arthropoda
- Clade: Pancrustacea
- Class: Insecta
- Order: Lepidoptera
- Family: Lasiocampidae
- Genus: Macrothylacia
- Species: M. rubi

Binomial name
- Macrothylacia rubi (Linnaeus, 1758)

Synonyms
- Phalaena rubi Linnaeus, 1758; Macrothylacia pygmaea Reuter, 1893; Macrothylacia rubi ab. transfuga Krulikowsky, 1908

= Macrothylacia rubi =

Fox moth

Species of moth

Macrothylacia rubi, the fox moth, is a lepidopteran belonging to the family Lasiocampidae. It was first described by Carl Linnaeus in his 1758 10th edition of Systema Naturae.

== Distribution and habitat ==
This species can be found from Western Europe to Central Asia and Siberia. These moths live in open woodlands, moors and prairies.

== Description ==
The wingspan of the male is 40–65 mm. The wings are reddish brown in males (hence the name), while females are usually paler, more greyish in colour and slightly larger than males. Both sexes show two narrow, straight, light-yellow, transverse bands, running across the forewings. The abdomen is thick, grey brown and hairy. The caterpillars can reach a length of about 80 millimetres (3.1 in). They are initially black with bright yellow or orange segments, later they become darker, always covered with blackish and tawny-coloured hairs and with light grey hair on the sides.

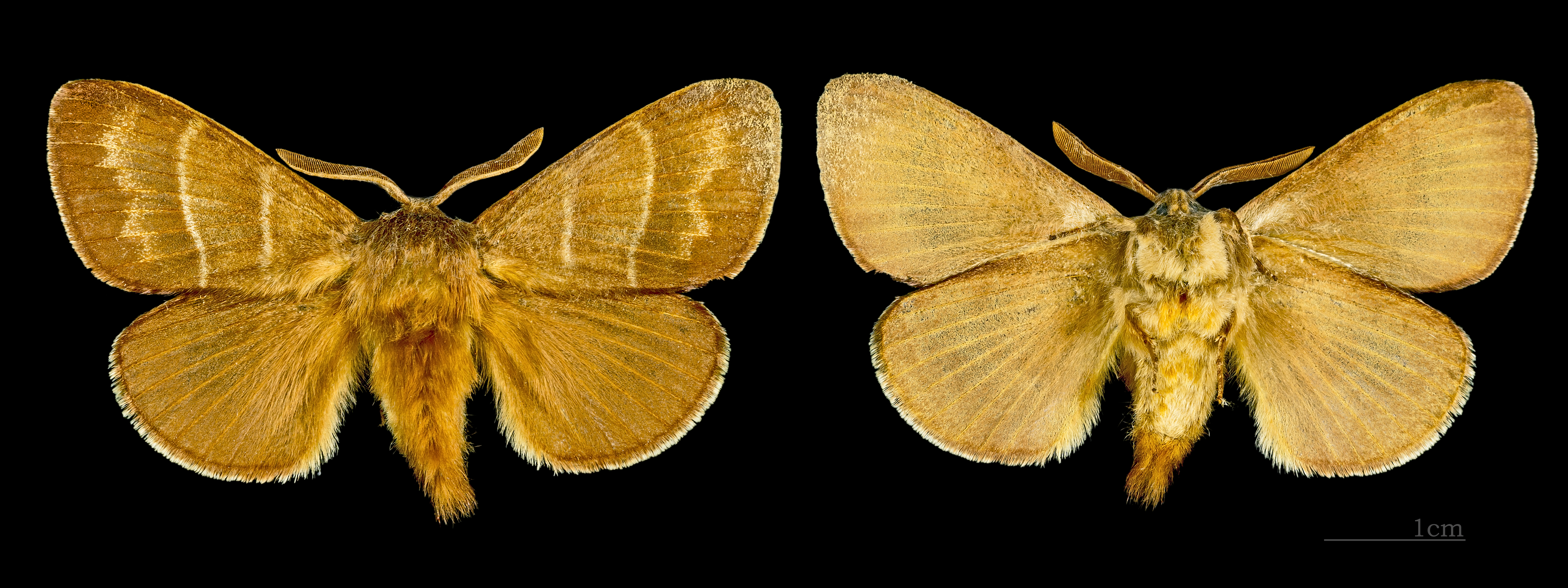
Both sides of male

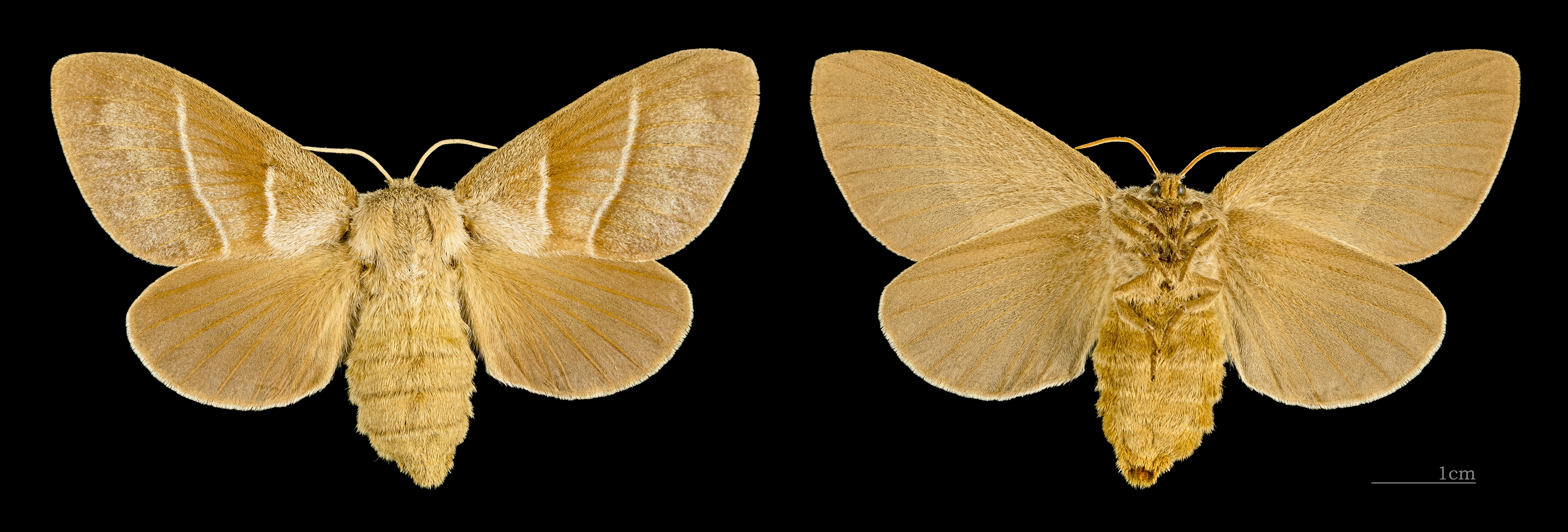
Both sides of female

== Biology ==
It is a univoltine species. Between September and March the caterpillars hibernate in leaf litter. These moths take flight from May to July. The males usually fly in the afternoon and night, while the females fly only at night. Caterpillars feed on heather (Calluna) bramble (Rubus fruticosus), Gramineae, Betula verrucosa, Salix, Populus tremula, Vicia cracca, Trifolium medium, Trifolium pratense, Vaccinium myrtillus, Fragaria, Potentilla and Geranium sylvaticum.

== Gallery ==
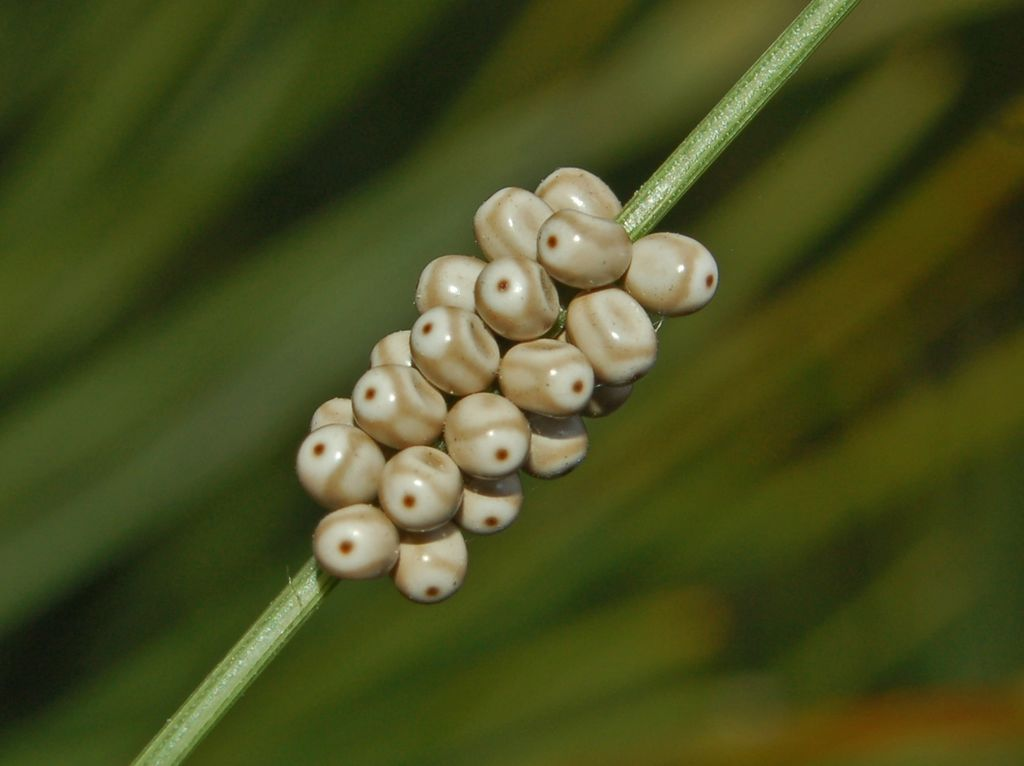
Eggs

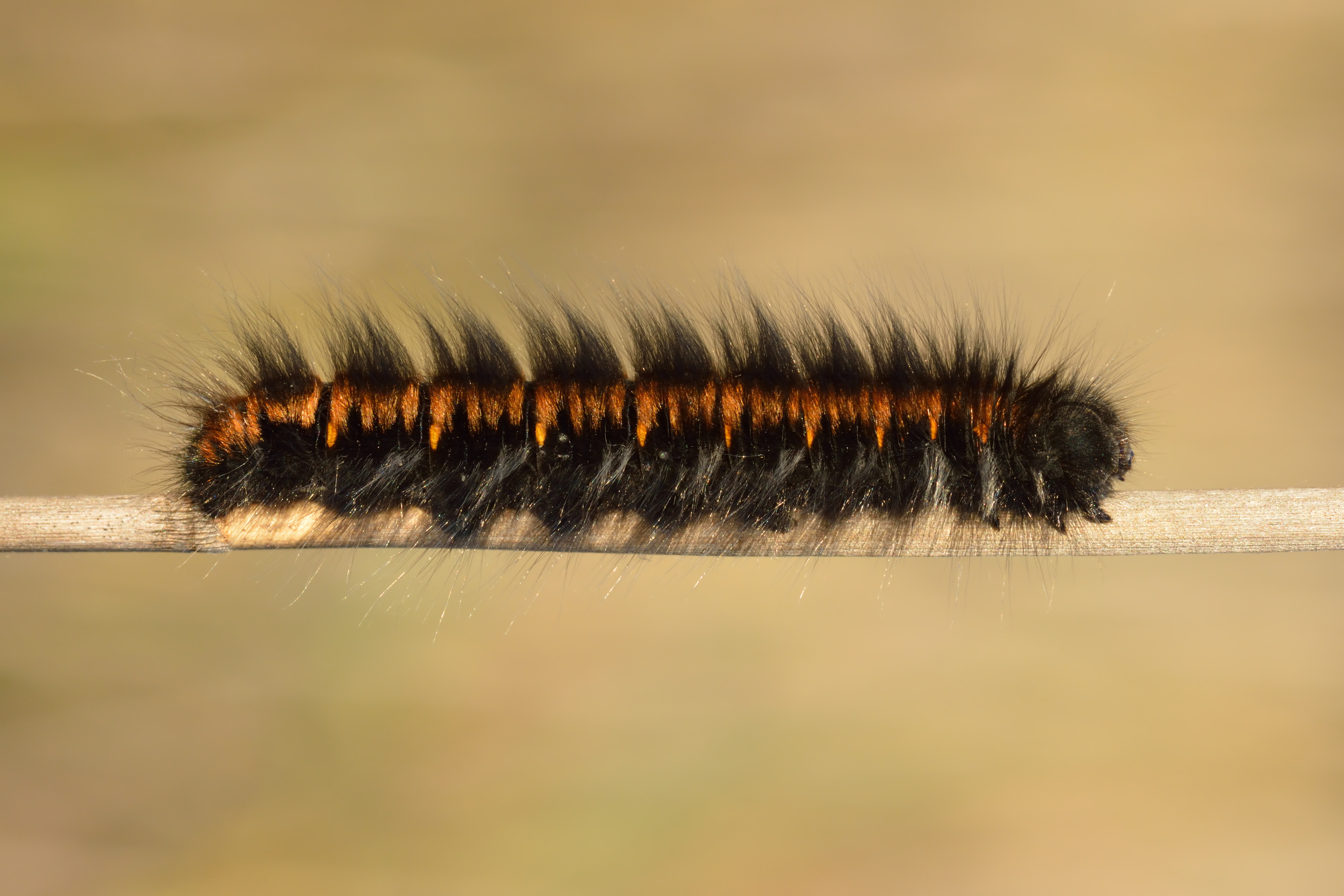
Caterpillar

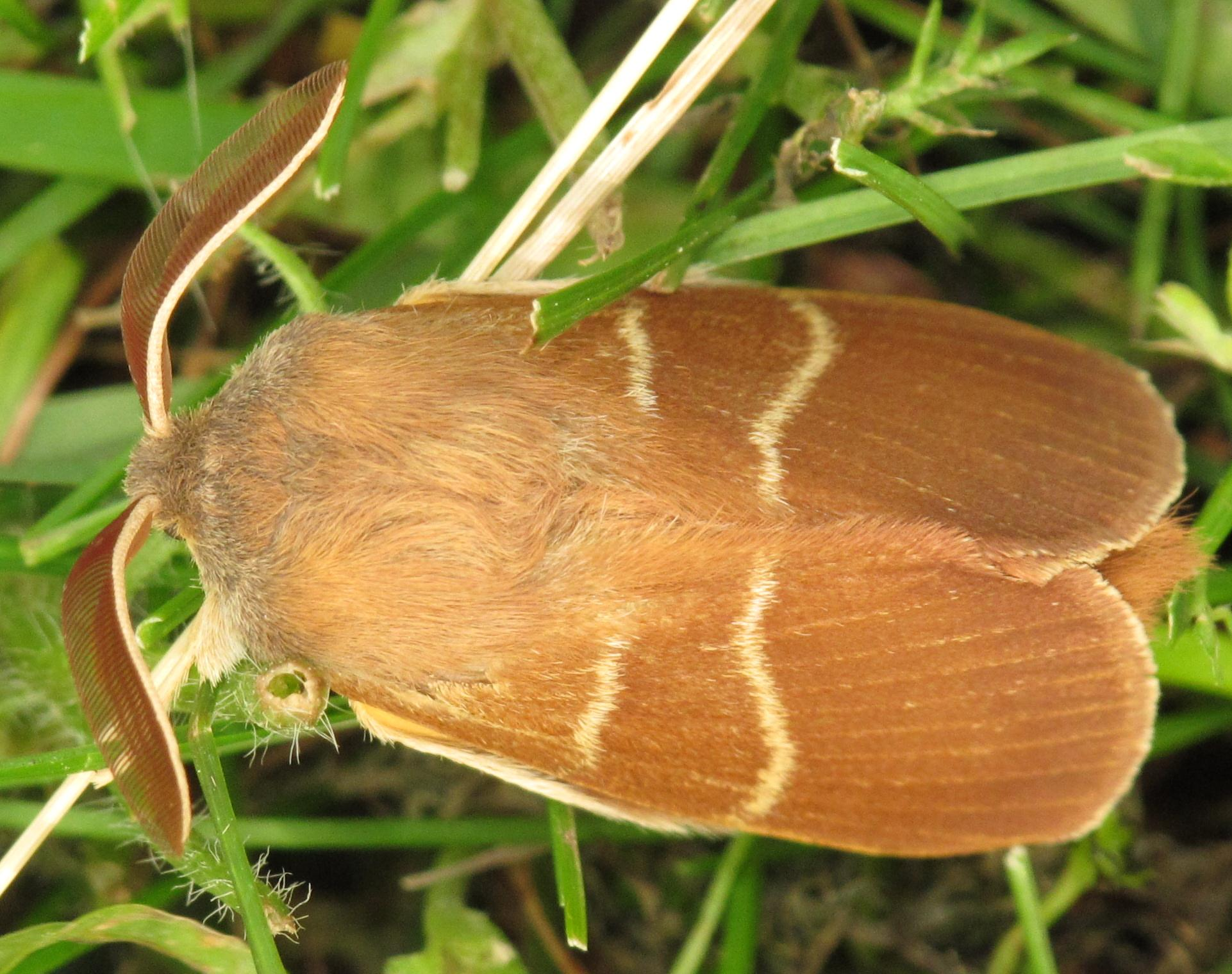
Male

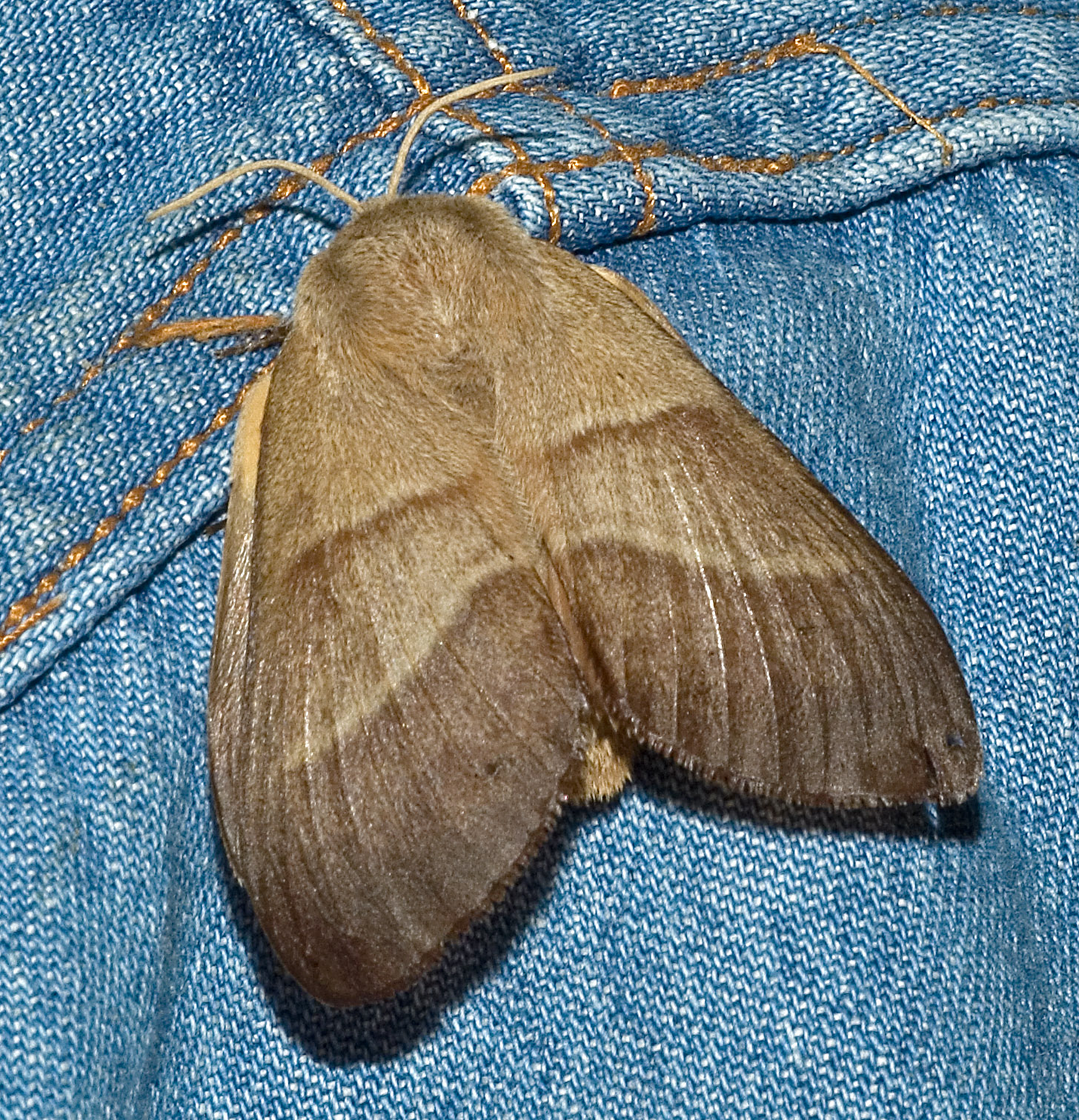
Female

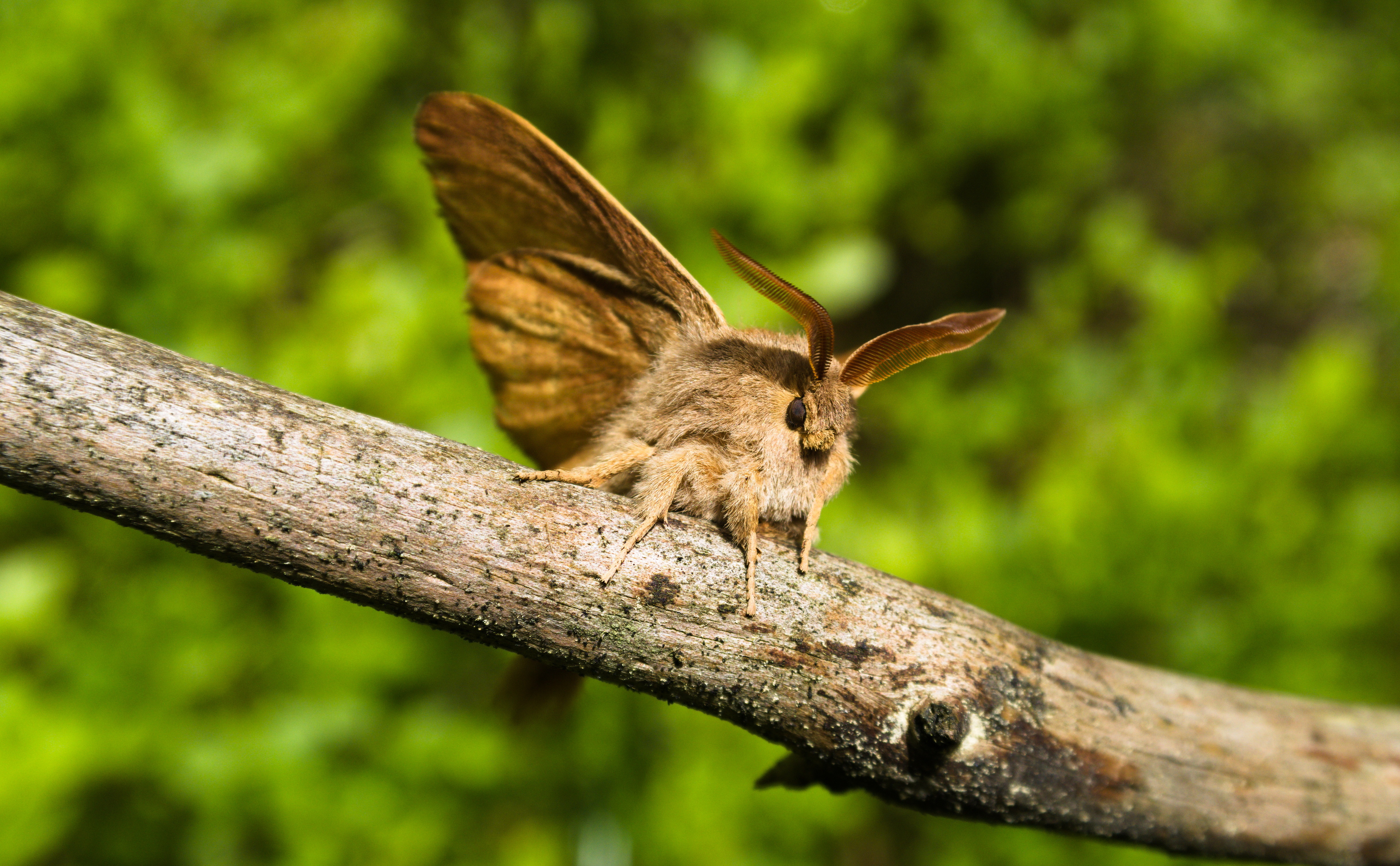
Male in the Dresden Heath
