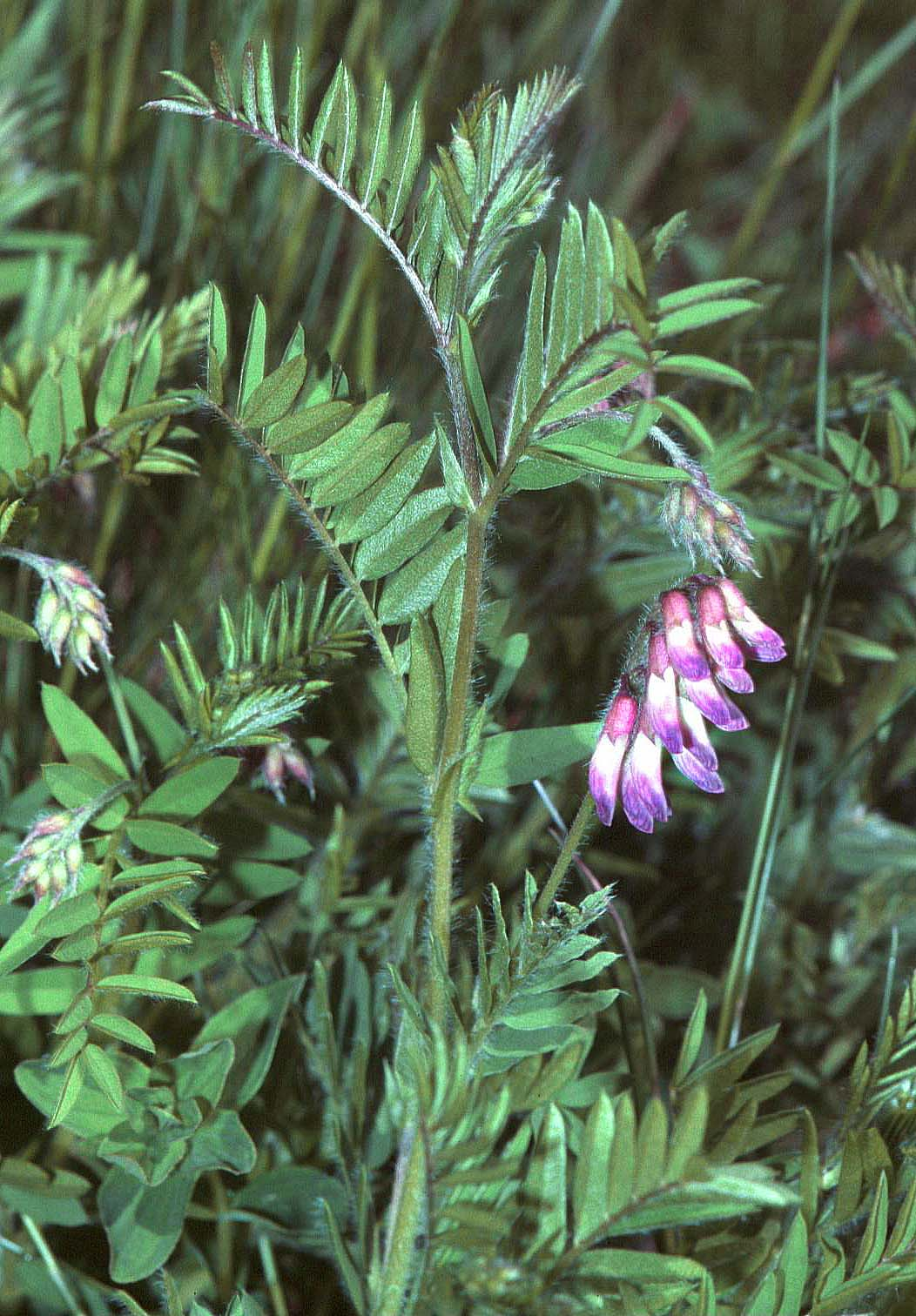

Conservation status
- Least Concern (IUCN 3.1)

Scientific classification
- Kingdom: Plantae
- Clade: Tracheophytes
- Clade: Angiosperms
- Clade: Eudicots
- Clade: Rosids
- Order: Fabales
- Family: Fabaceae
- Subfamily: Faboideae
- Genus: Vicia
- Species: V. orobus

Binomial name
- Vicia orobus DC.

Synonyms
- Orobus sylvaticus L.

= Vicia orobus =

Species of legume

Vicia orobus is a species of leguminous plant in the genus Vicia, known as wood bitter-vetch. It is found in Atlantic areas of Europe, especially in the rocky edges of seasonally-grazed fields. It grows up to 60 cm (24 in) tall, and has no tendrils at the ends of its pinnate leaves. Its flowers are white with purple veins, and are borne in groups of 6 or more.

== Description ==
Vicia orobus is a perennial plant, growing up to 60 centimetres (24 in) tall. Its leaves are paripinnate, with 6–15 pairs of leaflets on each leaf. The flowers are borne in groups of 6–20. Each individual flower is 12–15 mm (0.5–0.6 in) long, and is white with purple veins. The fruit is a 4–5-seeded pod around 20–30 mm (0.8–1.2 in) long.

V. orobus can be distinguished from other species of Vicia occurring in the British Isles by a number of characters. It is one of three species to lack tendrils (the others being V. lathyroides and V. faba), with the leaves terminating instead in a short point. It differs from the other two species without tendrils in being perennial, having more than 6 flowers in each inflorescence, having peduncles more than 3 cm (1.2 in) long, and having more than 5 pairs of leaflets in each pinnate leaf. The lack of tendrils is thought to represent a primitive state within the genus Vicia.

== Distribution ==
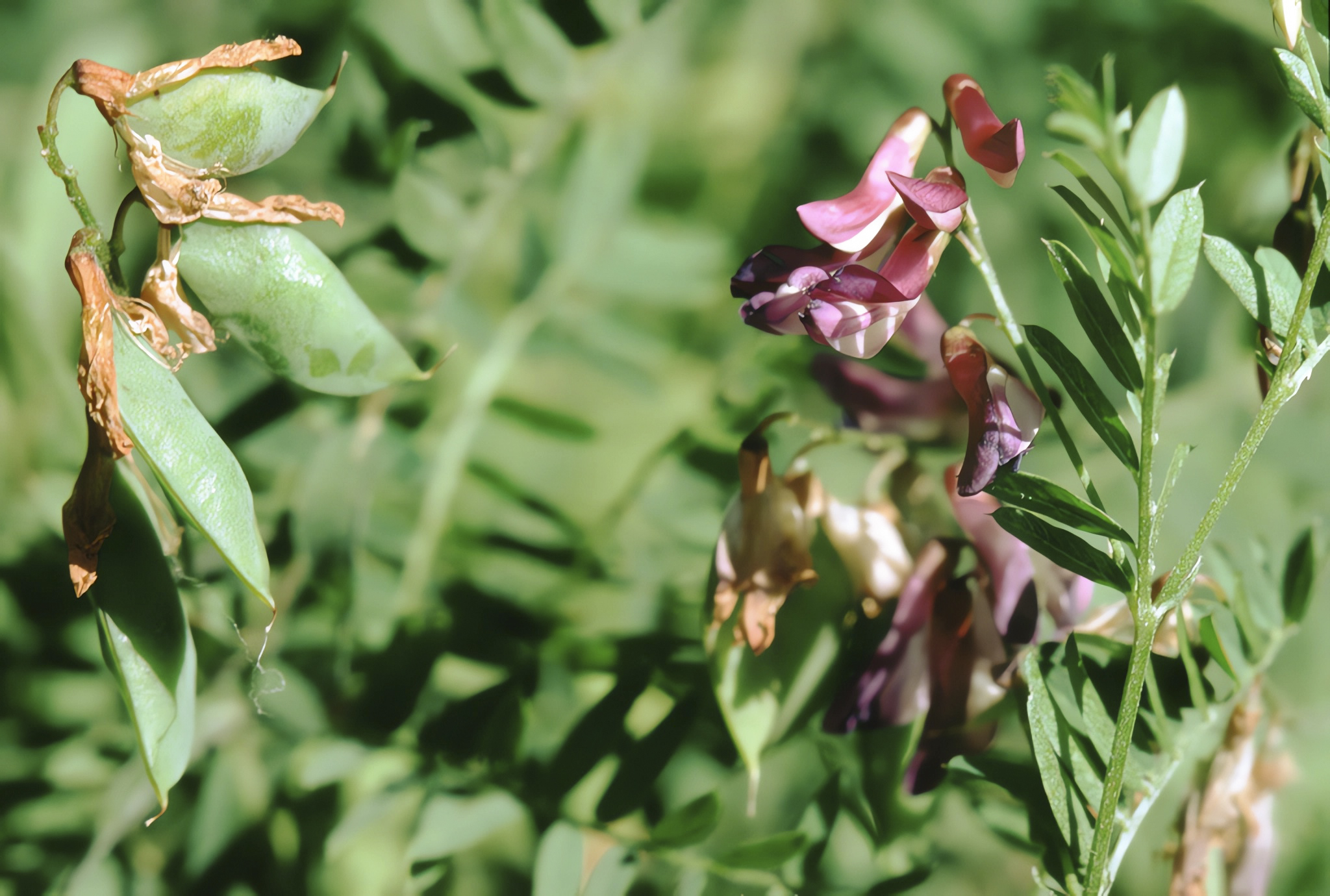
Vicia cassubica replaces V. orobus in more easterly parts of continental Europe.

Vicia orobus has an Atlantic distribution, occurring from northern Spain to Norway, at altitudes of 0–2,380 metres (0–7,808 ft). In Great Britain, V. orobus has a westerly distribution, and is extinct in South East England. Much of the global population is found in the British Isles, where it is largely restricted to altitudes of 200–300 metres (660–980 ft), except in the far north (north of Lochinver), where it can be found down to sea level. Its stronghold is in central and north-western Wales.

In Ireland, V. orobus is declining in numbers, and has been found recently at fewer than a dozen sites, most of which hold very small populations. It is therefore accorded legal protection in the Republic of Ireland, under the Flora (Protection) Order 1999.

In continental Europe, V. orobus is replaced to the east by V. cassubica, with the division between the two species running through central France. It is present as a native species in Switzerland, where it is the only truly Atlantic species.

== Habitat ==
Vicia orobus is found in a variety of sites, including the edges of woods, on heaths, in meadows or in rocky places over limestone. In Great Britain, it is frequently found at the edges of fields where sheep are grazed in winter, but a hay crop is grown in summer. It is threatened by both overgrazing and undergrazing, as well as other activities, such as grassland improvement and land reclamation. V. orobus flowers from May to July and is pollinated by bees.

Many species are associated with V. orobus in Great Britain, including Alchemilla glabra, Carex pallescens, Genista anglica, Pseudorchis albida, Rhinanthus minor, Stachys officinalis and Viola lutea. At some sites in Ireland, V. orobus is associated with species such as Dryas octopetala, Sesleria albicans and Geranium sanguineum, which are characteristic of the flora of the Burren, although V. orobus does not occur in the Burren, or in floristically similar regions nearby.

== Taxonomy ==
Vicia orobus was first described by Augustin Pyramus de Candolle in the 1815 work Flore Française. It is classified in the section Vicia sect. Cassubicae, alongside species such as V. cassubica, V. megalotropis and its likely sister species, V. sparsiflora.
