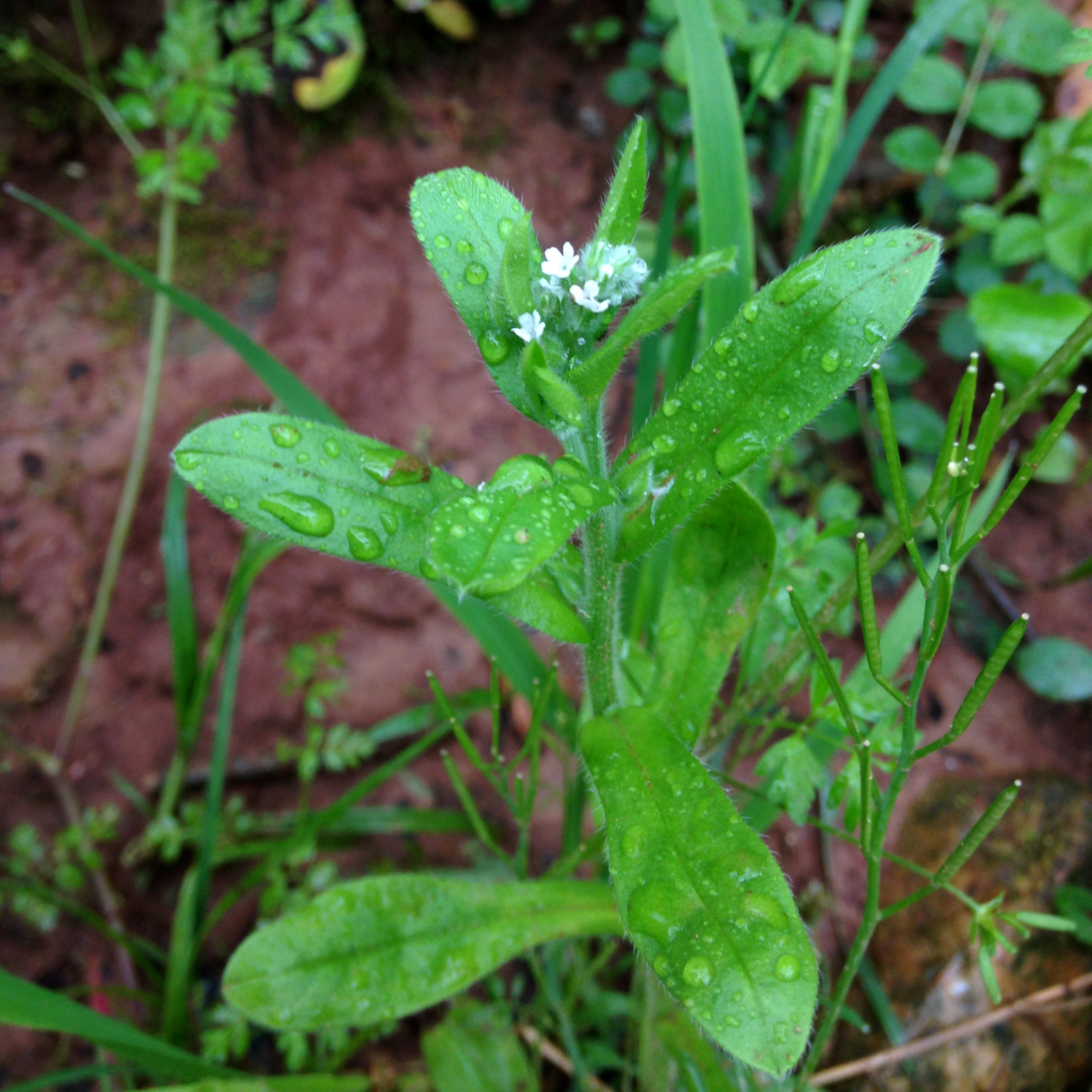
- Emerging flowers

Scientific classification
- Kingdom: Plantae
- Clade: Tracheophytes
- Clade: Angiosperms
- Clade: Eudicots
- Clade: Asterids
- Order: Boraginales
- Family: Boraginaceae
- Genus: Myosotis
- Species: M. macrosperma

Binomial name
- Myosotis macrosperma Engelmann

= Myosotis macrosperma =

Species of flowering plant

Myosotis macrosperma, commonly called largeseed forget-me-not, is a species of flowering plant in the borage family (Boraginaceae). It is native to North America, where it found in the eastern United States and Ontario, Canada. It is found in a wide variety of natural habitats, including areas of bottomland forests, mesic forests, and prairies. It appears to be associated with nutrient rich soils. It is tolerant of disturbance, and can be found in highly degraded communities such as pastures and fallow fields.

Myosotis macrosperma is an herbaceous annual. It blooms in the spring, where it produces a cyme of white flowers. It differs from the similar-looking Myosotis verna (which occupies much of the same geographic range) in several characters. Myosotis macrosperma can be distinguished by its longer inflorescence nodes, larger and more deciduous calyx, and larger mericarps.

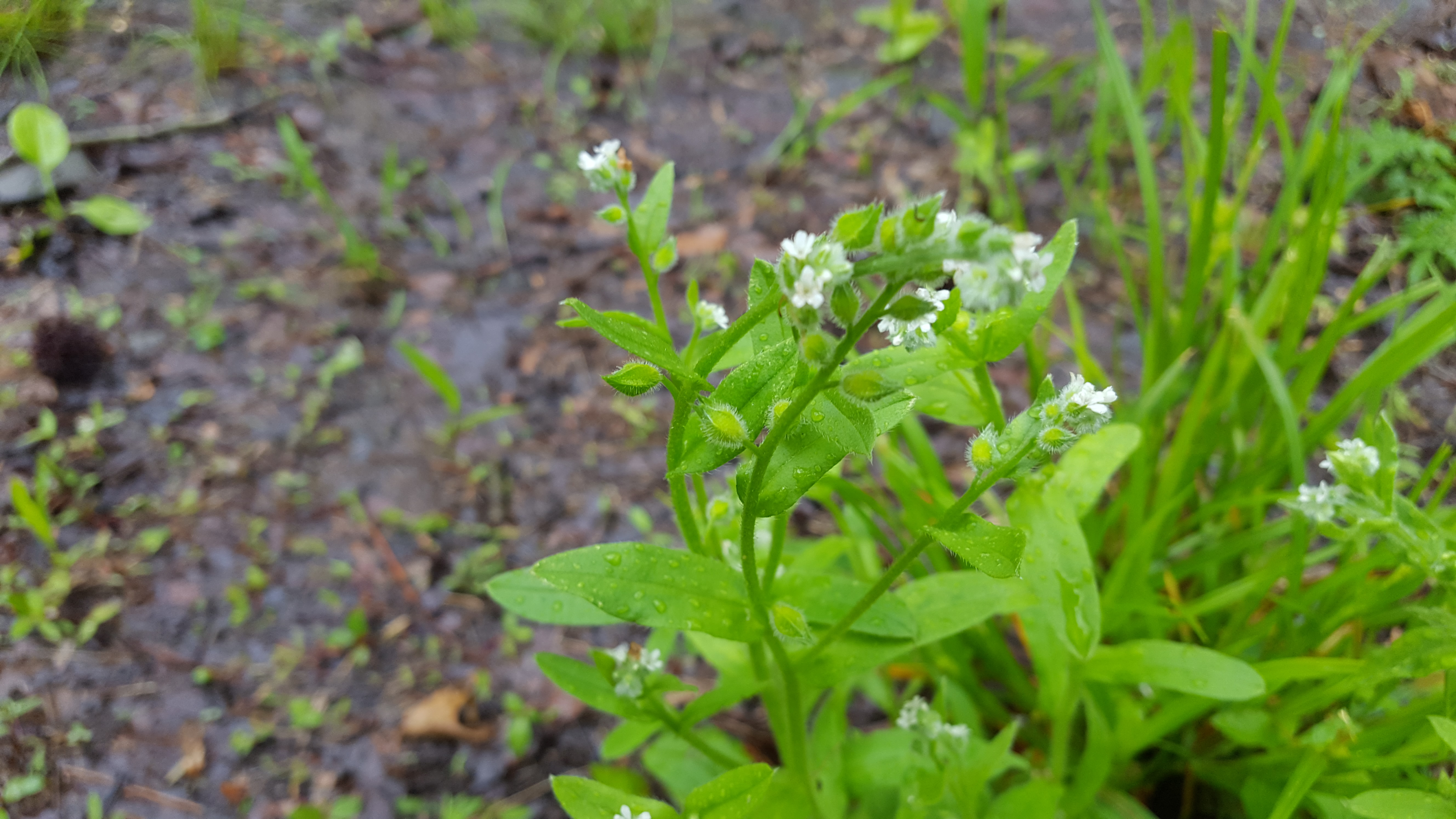
Myosotis macrosperma with mature fruit
