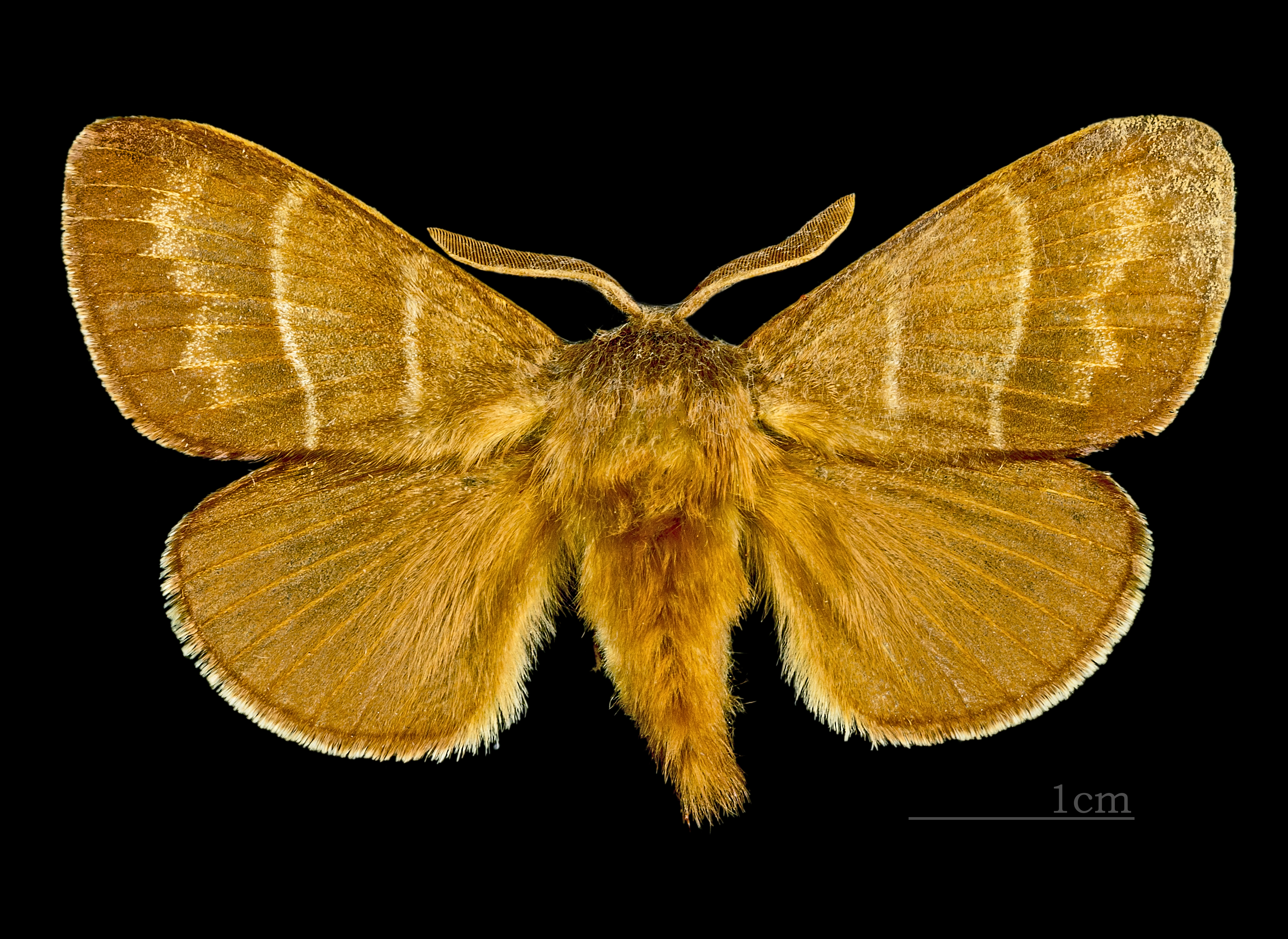
- Macrothylacia rubi is the type species

Scientific classification
- Domain: Eukaryota
- Kingdom: Animalia
- Phylum: Arthropoda
- Class: Insecta
- Order: Lepidoptera
- Family: Lasiocampidae
- Subfamily: Lasiocampinae
- Genus: Macrothylacia; Rambur, [1866]

= Macrothylacia =

Genus of moths

Macrothylacia is a genus of moths in the family Lasiocampidae described by Rambur in 1866.

== Species ==
Based on Lepidoptera and Some Other Life Forms:

- Macrothylacia digramma Meade-Waldo, 1905 Iberia and Morocco
- Macrothylacia rubi (Linnaeus, 1758) – fox moth, distributed in Europe, central Asia and Siberia
