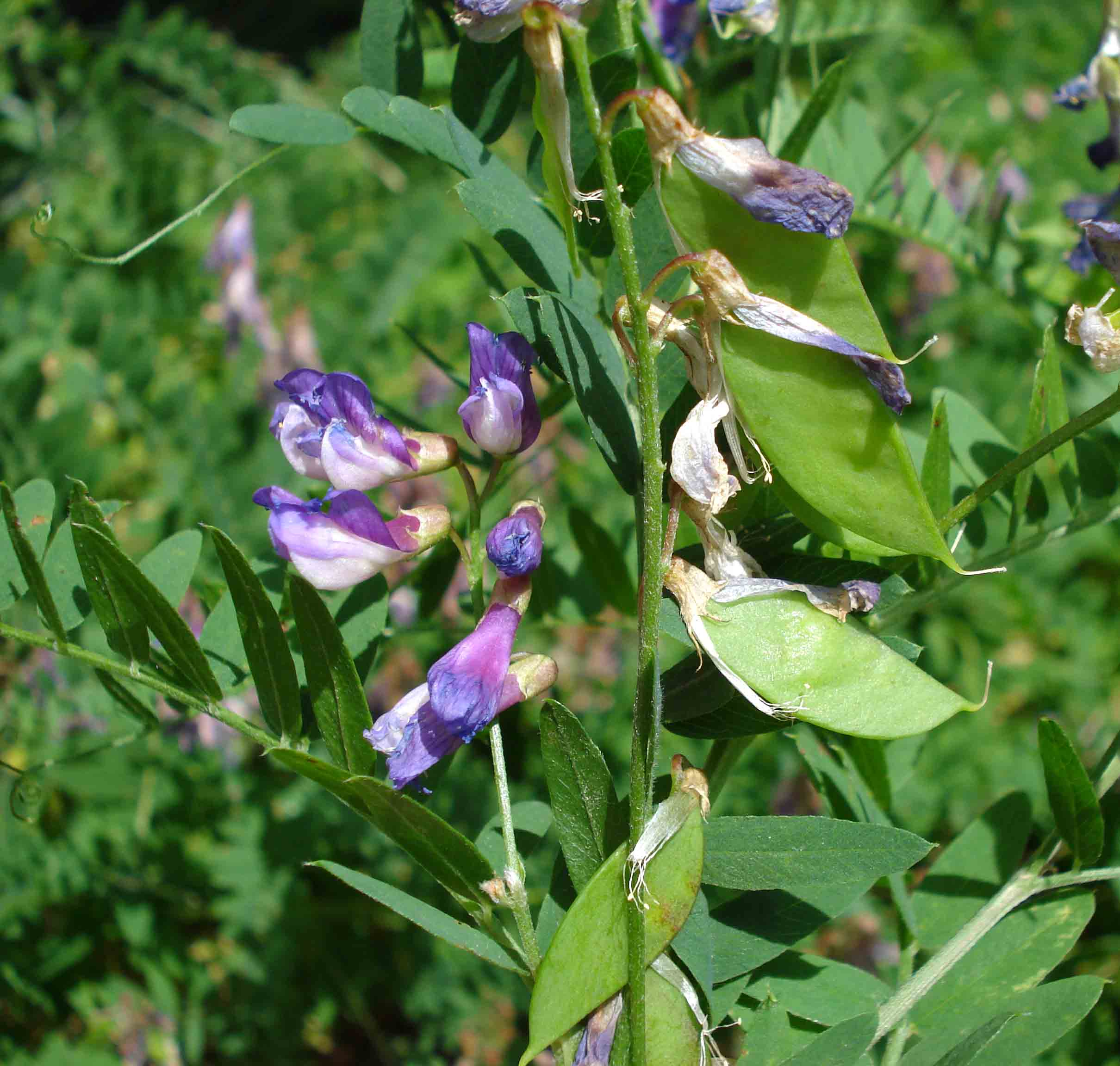
- Flowering and fruiting

Scientific classification
- Kingdom: Plantae
- Clade: Tracheophytes
- Clade: Angiosperms
- Clade: Eudicots
- Clade: Rosids
- Order: Fabales
- Family: Fabaceae
- Subfamily: Faboideae
- Genus: Vicia
- Species: V. cassubica

Binomial name
- Vicia cassubica L.

Synonyms
- List: Cracca cassubica (L.) Opiz; Ervilia cassubica (L.) Schur; Ervilia orobos Schur; Ervum cassubicum (L.) Peterm.; Orobus sylvaticus Bastard; Vicia abbreviata C.A.Mey.; Vicia adriatica (Freyn) Fritsch; Vicia frutescens Gilib.; Vicia militans Crantz; Vicia monosperma K.Koch; Vicia multiflora Pollich; Vicia rigida Herbich; Vicilla cassubica (L.) Schur

= Vicia cassubica =

Species of flowering plant

Vicia cassubica, called Kashubian vetch and Danzig vetch, is a species of flowering plant in the genus Vicia. Found in thermophilous oak forests, it also does well in old fields that are in later stages of succession.

== Distribution ==
Despite its binomial and common name suggesting a connection to the Kashubian region of Poland, the plant species is also native to most of Europe, Turkey, North, Northwest and South European Russia, the Levant, the Caucasus and Iran.

== Description ==
=== Stem ===
Naked or short-haired, erect or climbing, about 30–60 cm (12–24 in) long.

=== Leaves ===
Evenly-spaced, composed of 8–12 pairs of elliptic leaflets. Their short and numerous lateral nerves growing at a 45° angle to the main nerve are reticulate. The bracts are entire-edged.

=== Flowers ===
Blooms from June to July. Collected in clusters of 5–14 purple-violet butterfly flowers, whose corolla is 12–15 mm (0.47–0.59 in) long. Their filament is at least as long as a petal. The clusters are shorter than the leaves that grow at an angle.

=== Fruit ===
Egg-like pods about 1.5 cm (0.6 in) long containing usually 1–2 seeds.
