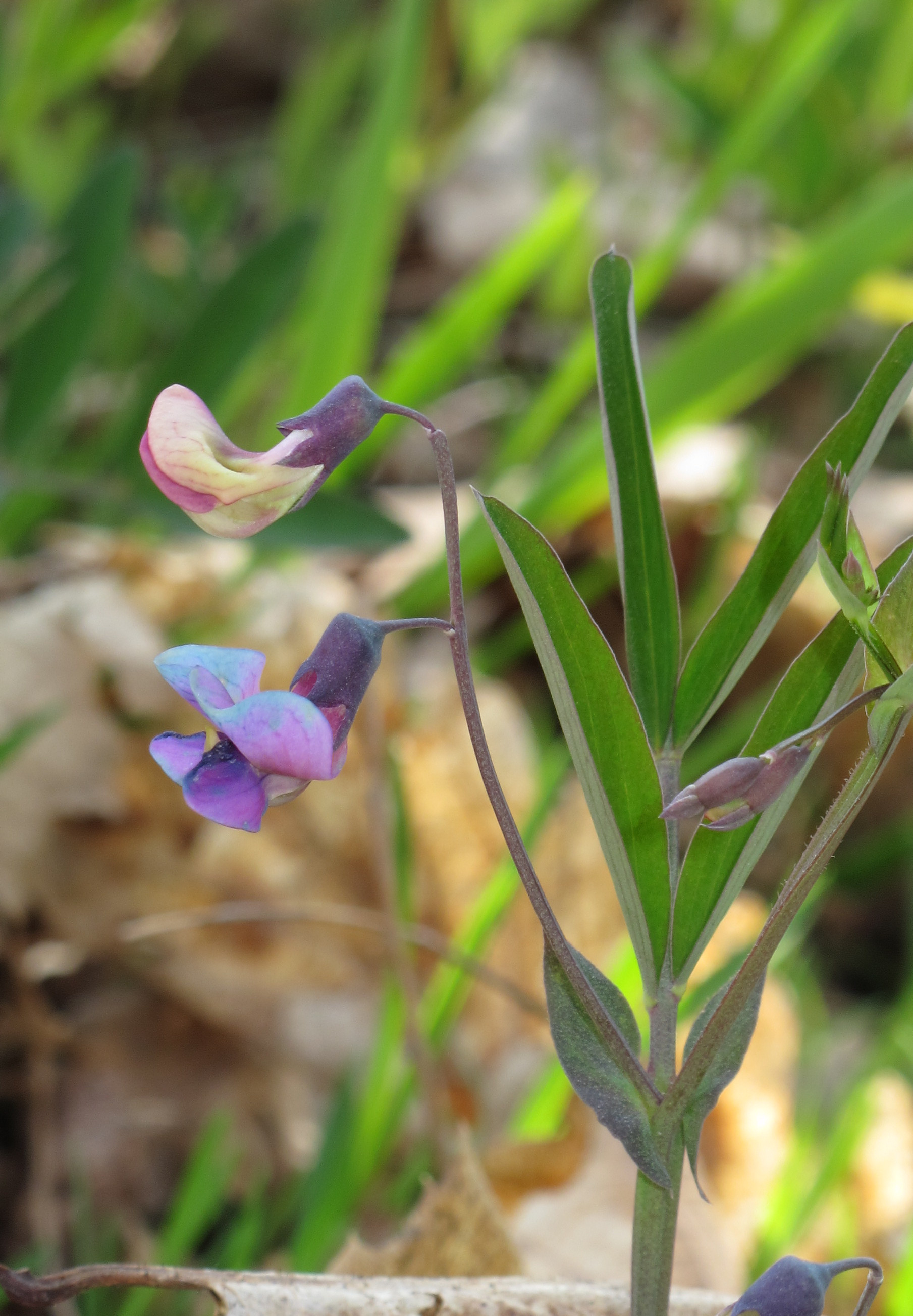

Conservation status
- Least Concern (IUCN 3.1)

Scientific classification
- Kingdom: Plantae
- Clade: Tracheophytes
- Clade: Angiosperms
- Clade: Eudicots
- Clade: Rosids
- Order: Fabales
- Family: Fabaceae
- Subfamily: Faboideae
- Genus: Lathyrus
- Species: L. linifolius

Binomial name
- Lathyrus linifolius (Reichard) Bässler

Synonyms
- Lathyrus macrorrhizus Wimm.; Lathyrus montanus Bernh.; Orobus linifolius Reichard; Orobus tuberosus "L., p.p."

= Lathyrus linifolius =

Species of plant

Lathyrus linifolius is a species of pea, commonly called bitter vetch or heath pea. The name bitter vetch is also sometimes used for Vicia ervilia and also for Vicia orobus.

The tubers of L. linifolius were formerly used as an appetite suppressant in medieval Scotland, and this use has brought the plant to recent medical attention.

== Description ==
Lathyrus linifolius is a perennial plant with dark-coloured tubers up to 3 centimetres (1 1/4 in) wide attached to the roots. The stem grows to 50 cm (20 in) tall and is erect, winged and nearly hairless. The leaves are alternate with short winged stalks and large stipules. The leaf blades are pinnate with two to four pairs of narrow lanceolate leaflets with blunt tips, entire margins and no tendrils. The inflorescence has a long stem and two to six red flowers, each 10 to 16 mm (3/8 to 5/8 in) long, turning bluer as they age. These have five sepals and five petals and are irregular. The uppermost petal is known as the "standard", the lateral two as the "wings" and the lowest two are joined to form the "keel". There are ten stamens and a single carpel. The fruit is a long reddish-brown pod containing up to ten seeds. This plant flowers in May and June.

== Distribution and habitat ==
Lathyrus linifolius is native to Europe and parts of Asia. Its typical habitat is rough grassy places, broad-leaved woodland, forest margins, hedgerows and banks.

== Uses ==
The tubers can be eaten raw but are better cooked and eaten like chestnuts.

The plant may be the one eaten by Roman soldiers in the battle of Dyrrhacium in 48 BCE.

The plant was formerly an ingredient of the Highland diet when food was scarce until the 18th century, when the potato became an important crop in the region. The small tubers were removed from the roots and dried. Once eaten, they prevented thirst and hunger pangs. Certain medieval herbals claimed that this effect could last for days or even weeks. It is surmised that this effect derives from the presence in them of transethanol. Attempts are being made to cultivate the plant on a commercial scale.
