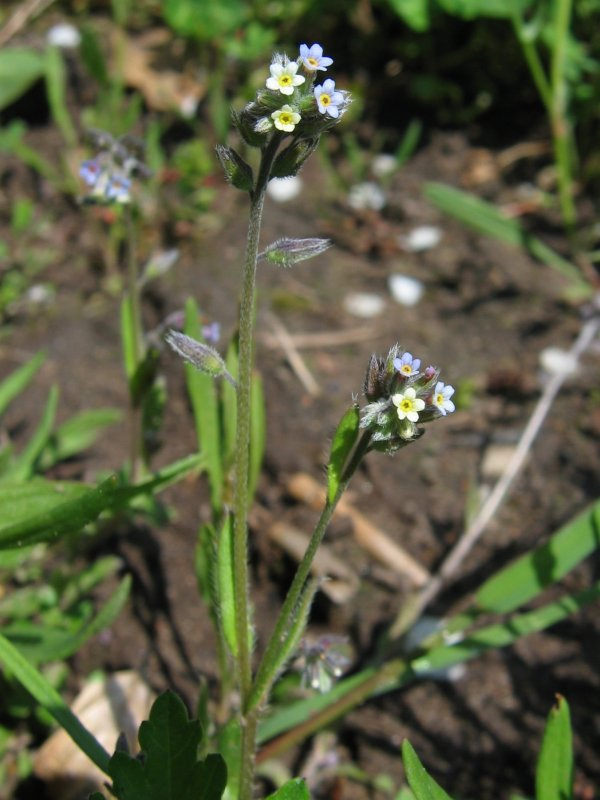

Scientific classification
- Kingdom: Plantae
- Clade: Tracheophytes
- Clade: Angiosperms
- Clade: Eudicots
- Clade: Asterids
- Order: Boraginales
- Family: Boraginaceae
- Genus: Myosotis
- Species: M. discolor

Binomial name
- Myosotis discolor Pers.

= Myosotis discolor =

Species of flowering plant

Myosotis discolor is a species of forget-me-not known by the common name changing forget-me-not. It is native to Europe, and it can also be found throughout eastern and western North America, where it is an introduced species. It grows in many types of habitat, including disturbed areas such as roadsides.

== Description ==
It is a hairy annual or perennial herb growing 10 to 50 centimeters tall with a slender, sometimes branching, erect stem. The sparse linear, lance-shaped, or oblong leaves are up to 4 centimeters long and under a centimeter wide. They are coated in straight hairs. The inflorescence is a coiled or curved array of tiny (less than 2mm) flowers in the upper portion of the stem, on short pedicels. The flowers are initially yellow or cream, changing to pink and then to blue as they mature, giving rise to the common name.

== Gallery ==
=== Inflorescences ===
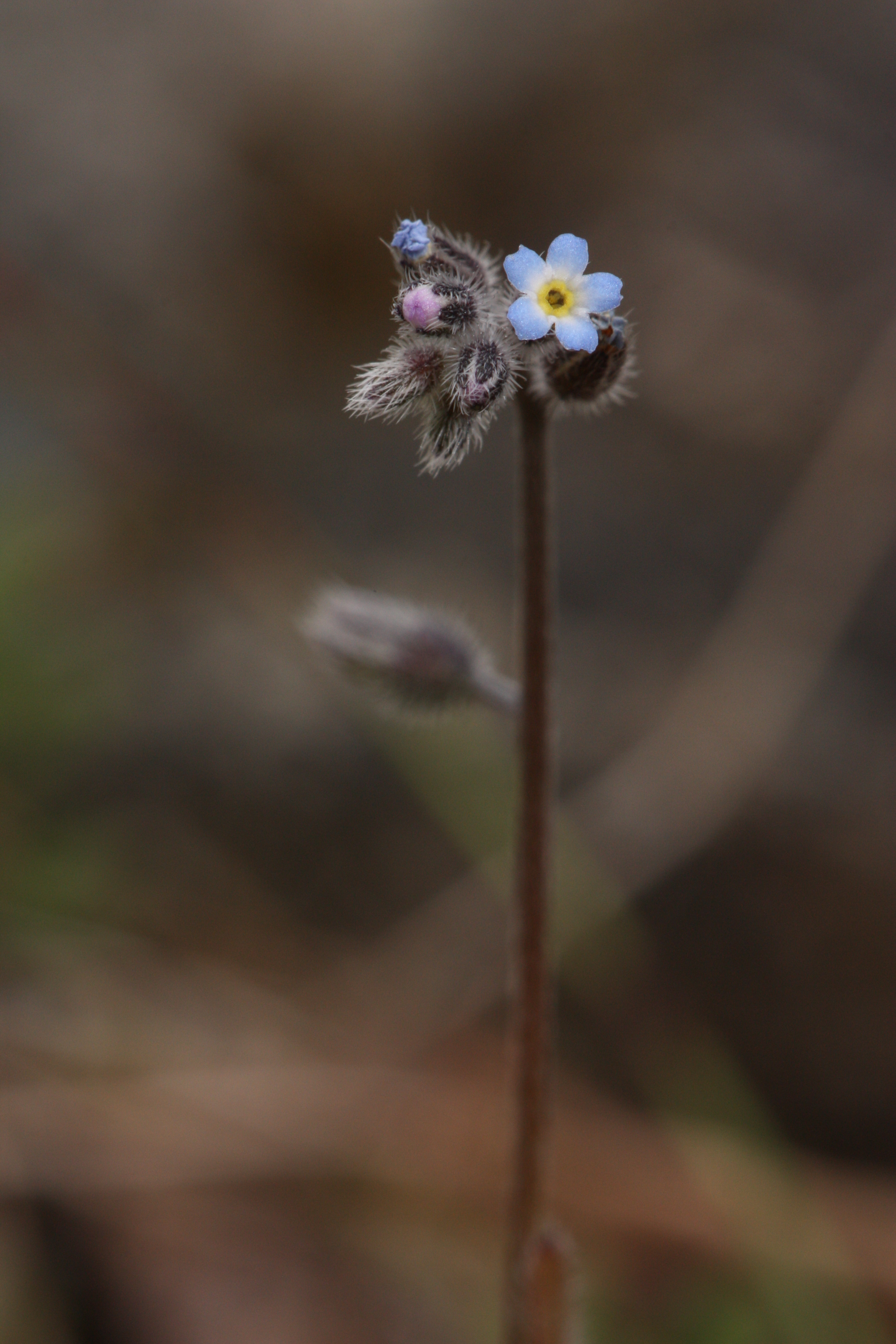
Tom McCall Preserve, Oregon

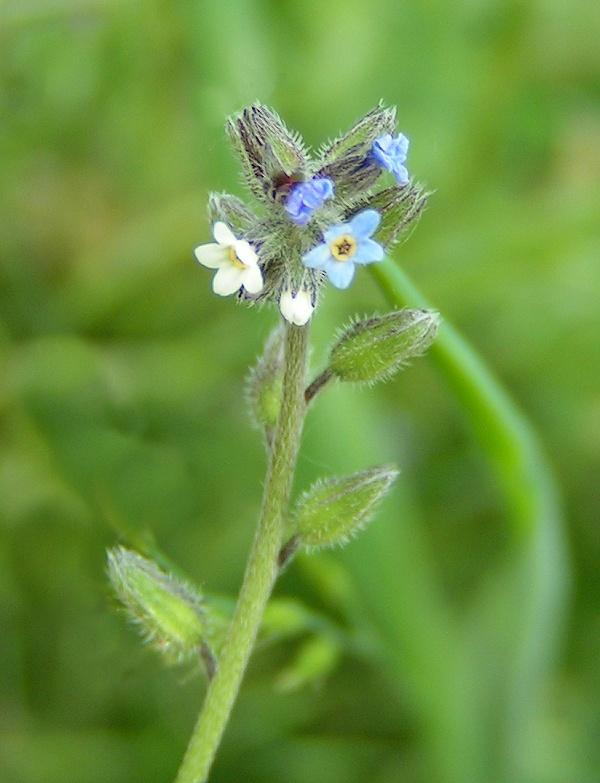
Great Holland Pits, Essex, UK

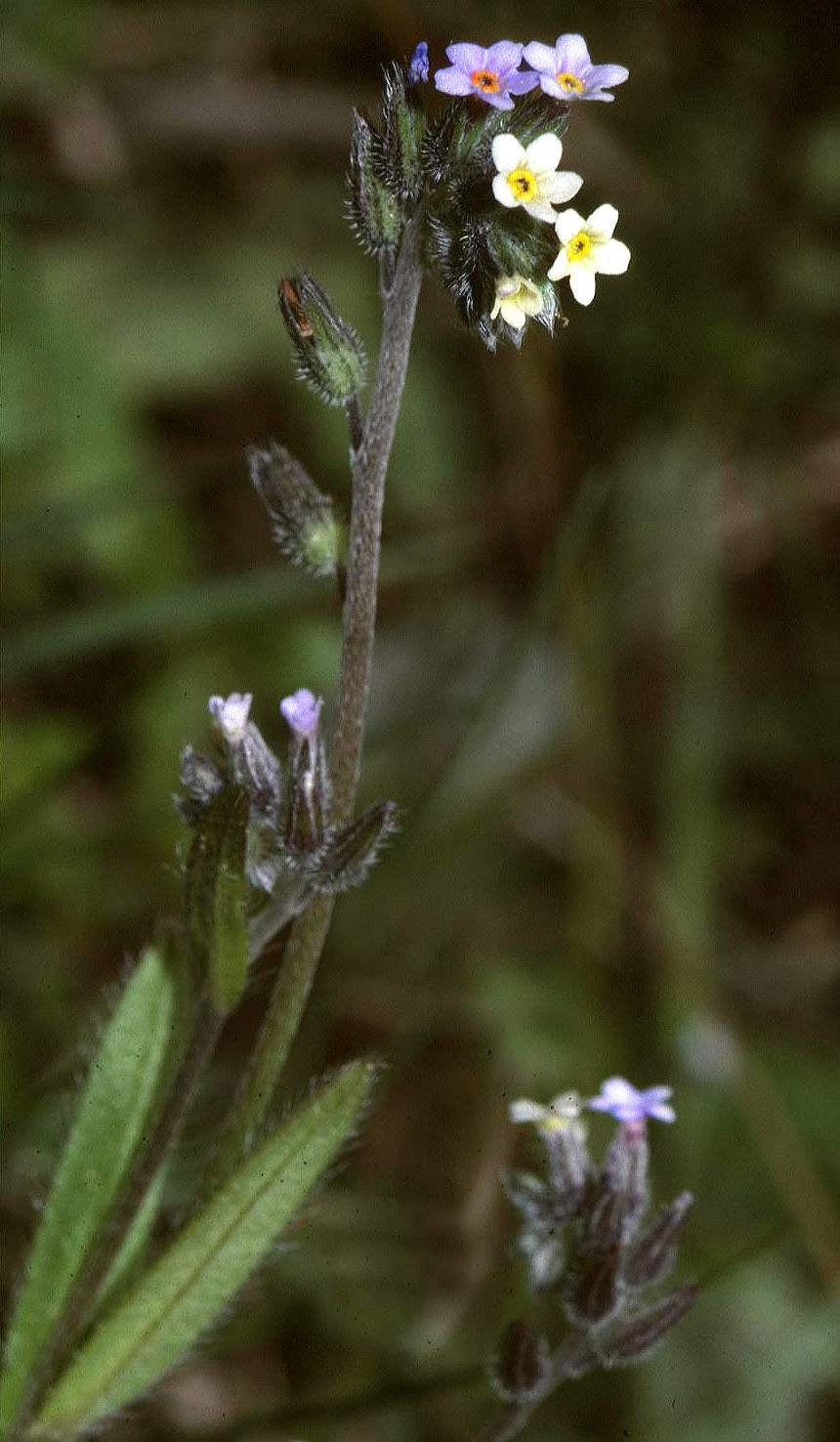
Unterfranken, Germany

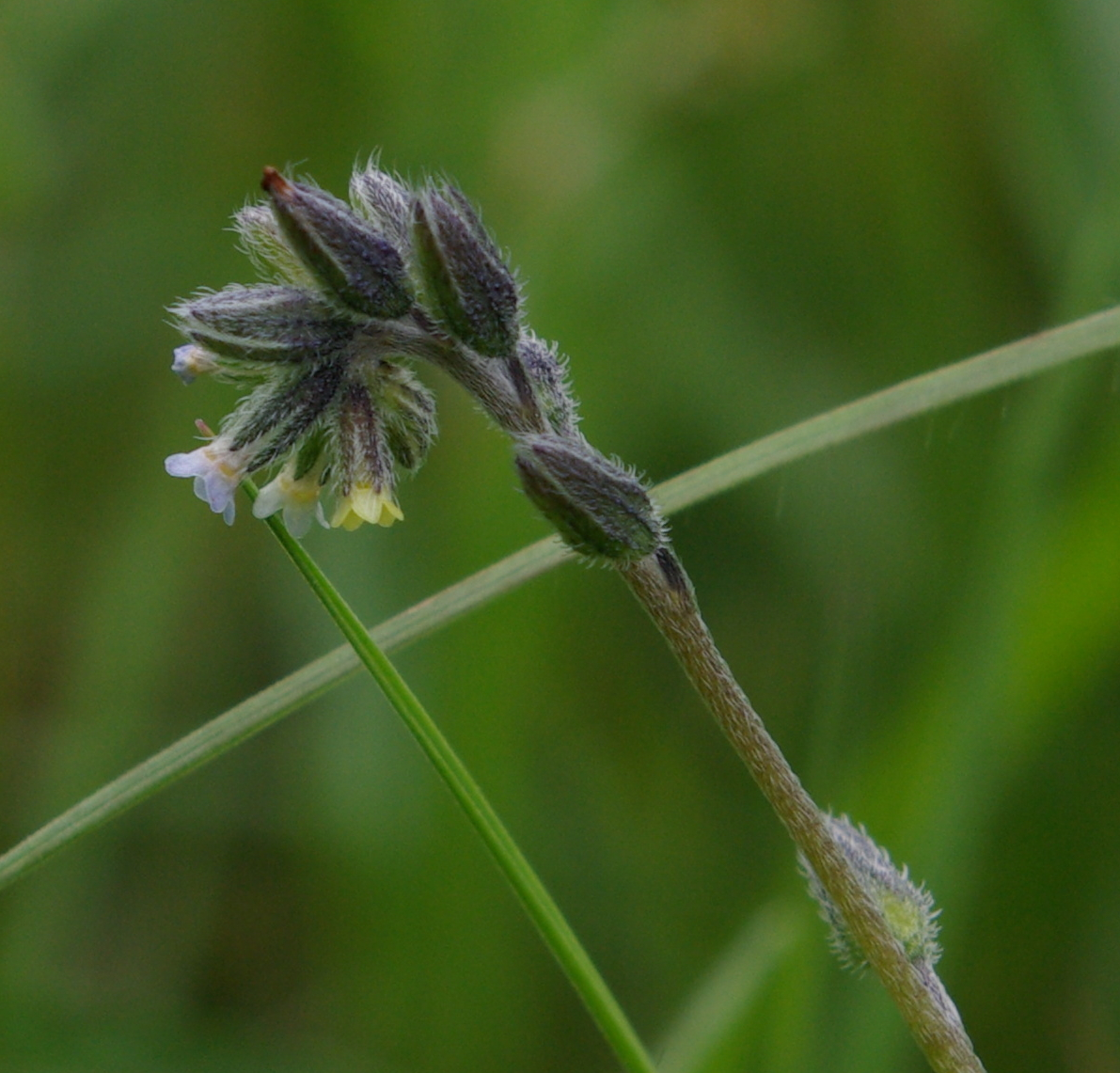
Parksville, BC

=== Flowers ===
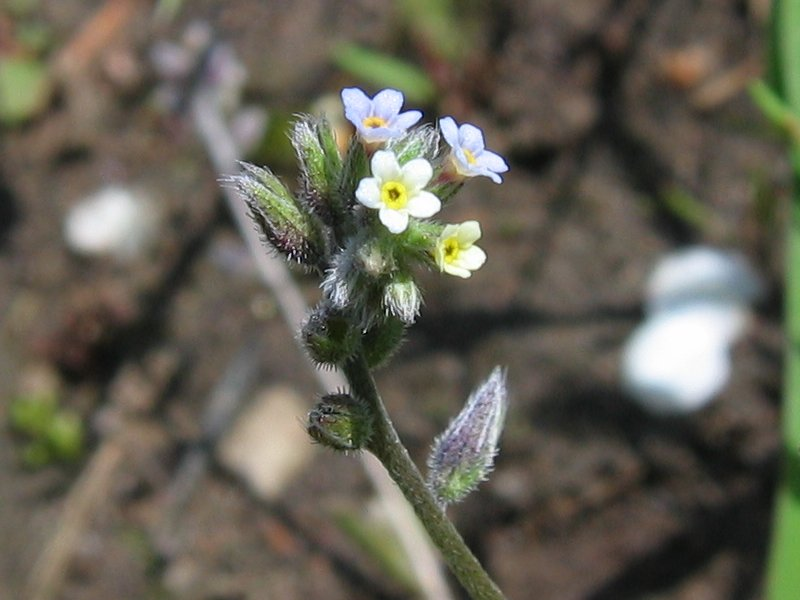
Rügen, Germany

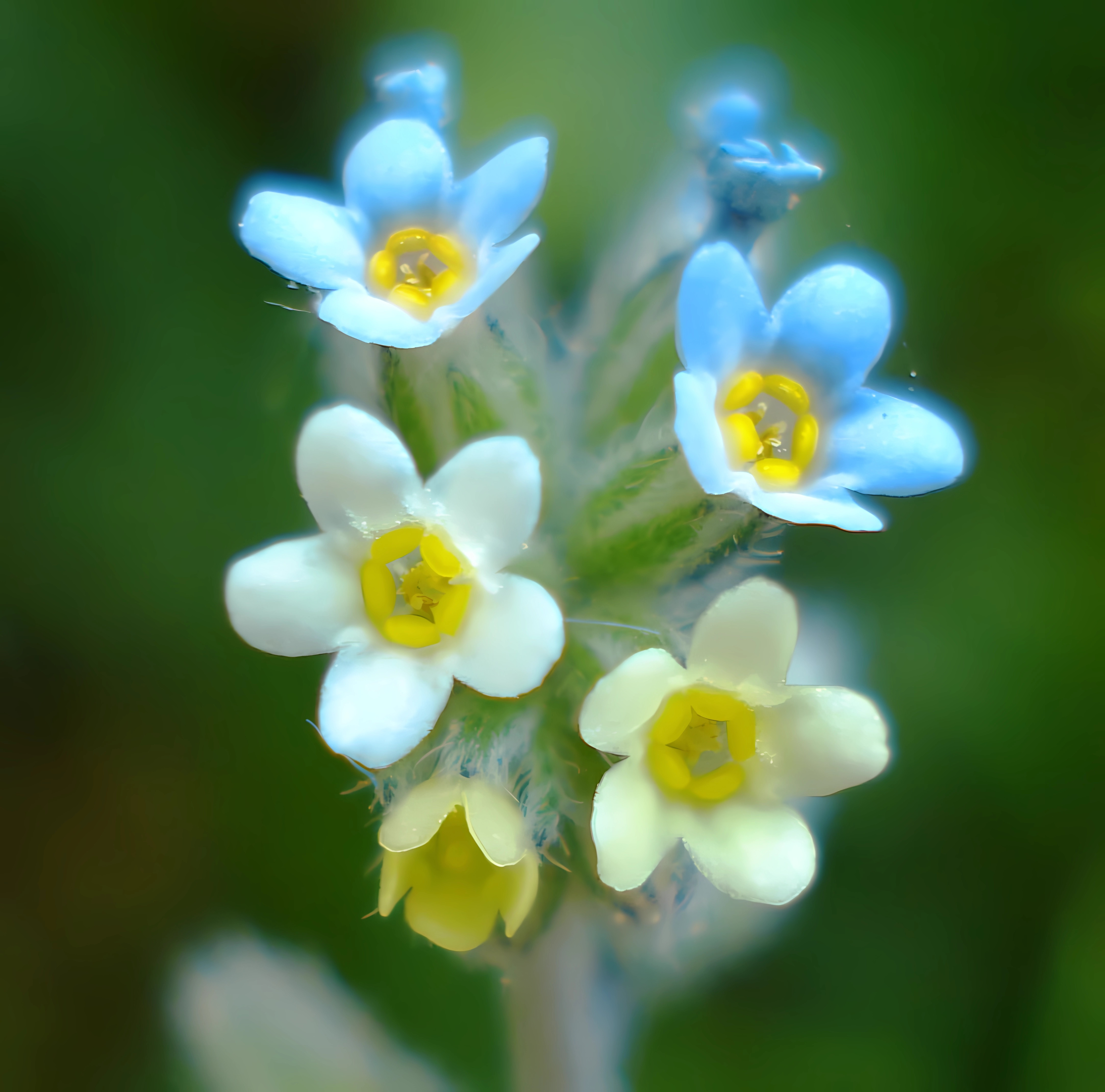
Unterfranken, Germany

=== Herbarium ===
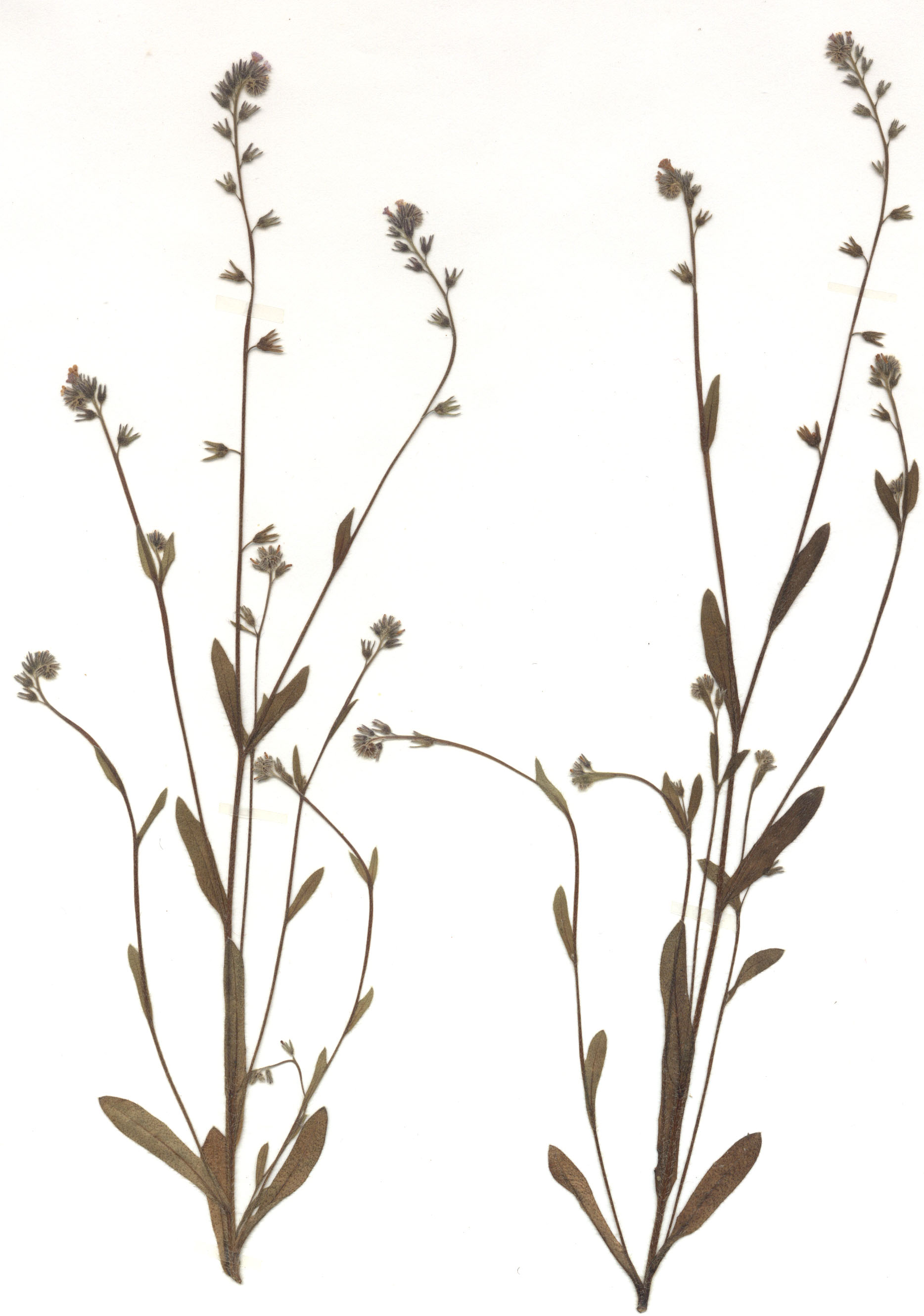

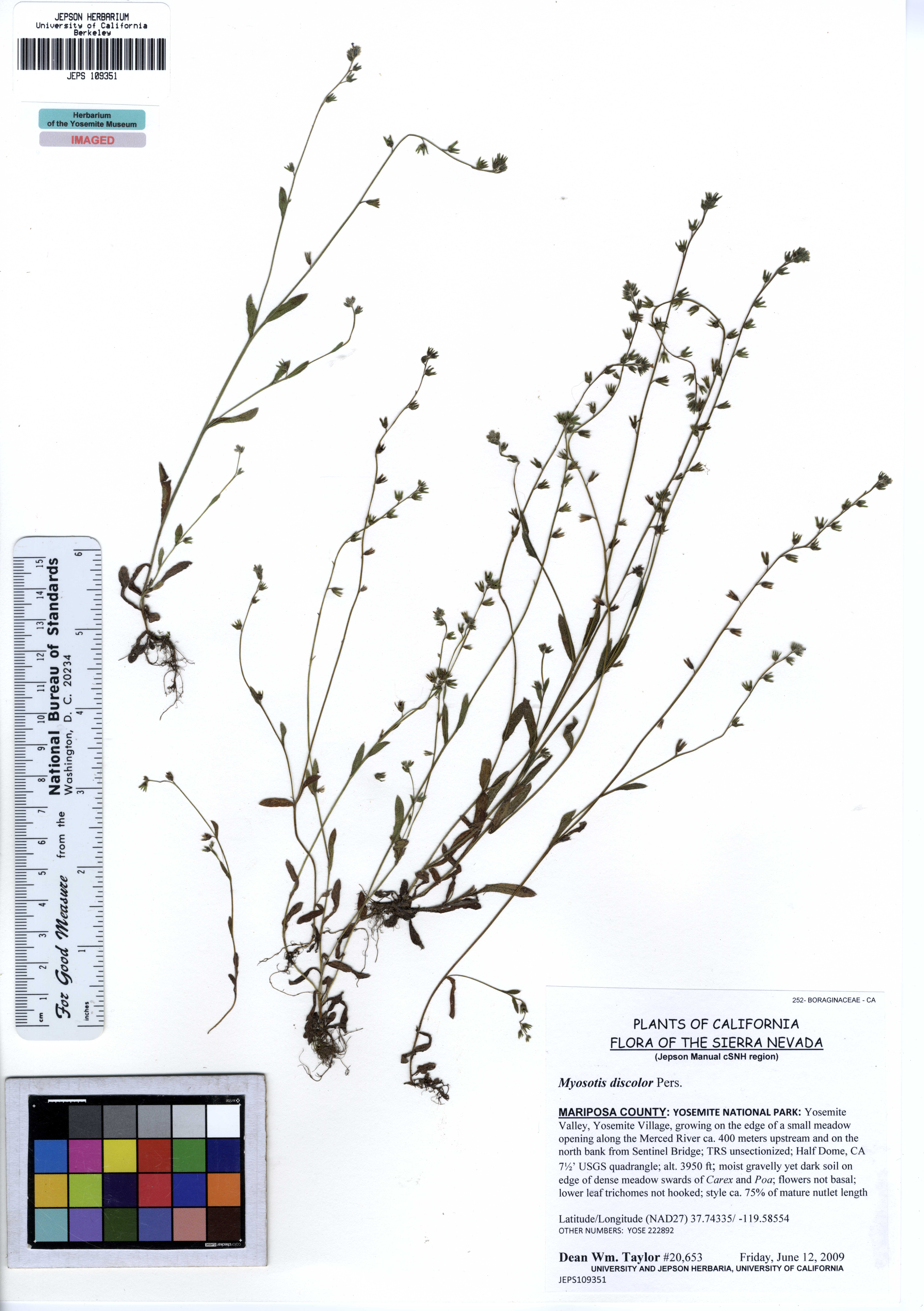
University and Jepson Herbaria, University of California

=== Botanical illustrations ===
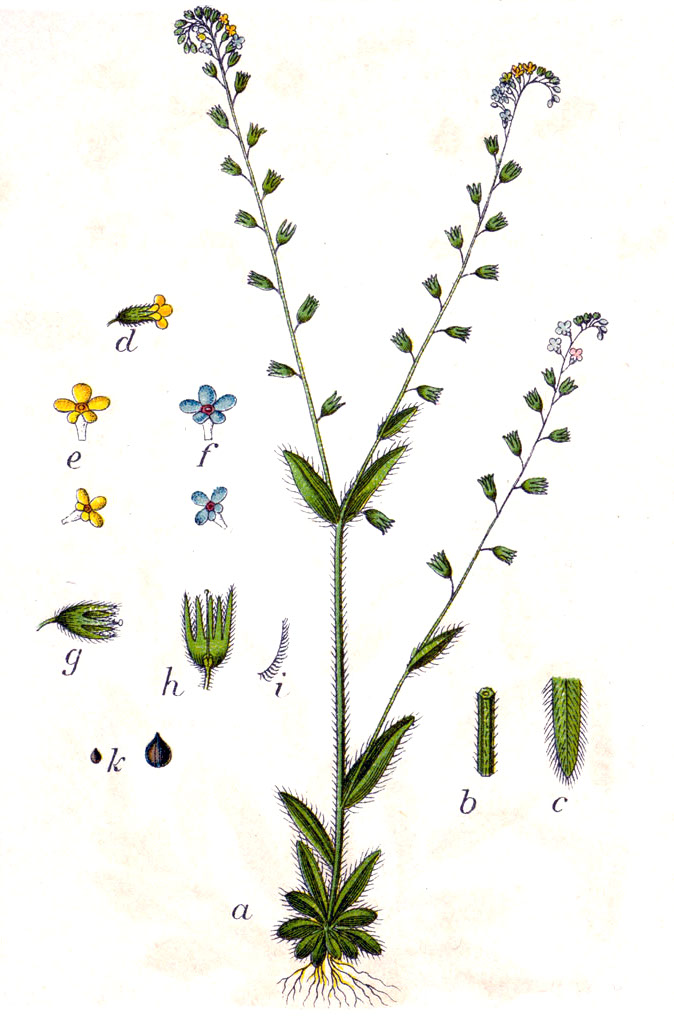
Plate 16 in Joseph Sturm's Deutschlands Flora in Abbildungen (1796), vol. 11

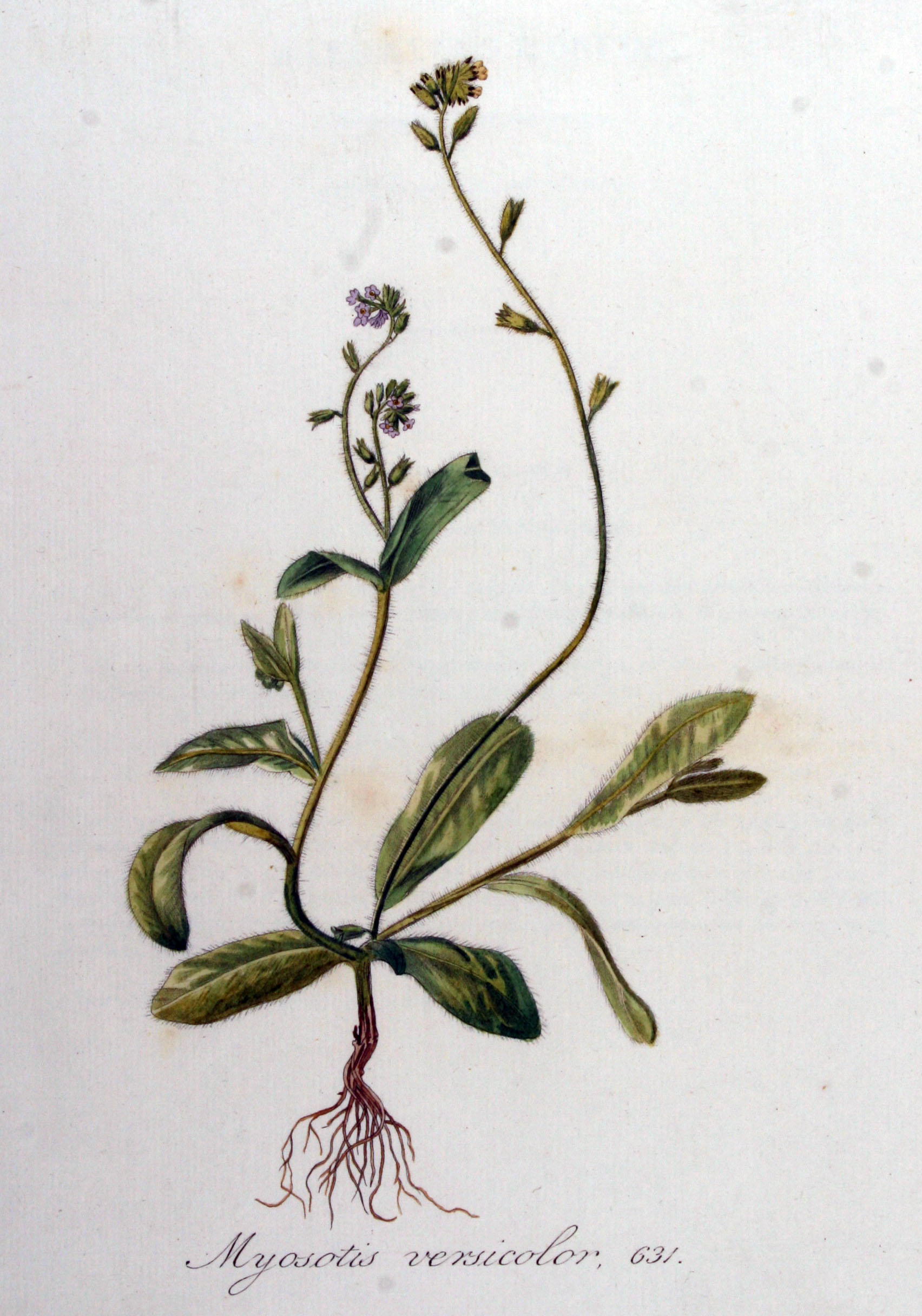
Plate 631 in Flora Batava, vol. 8

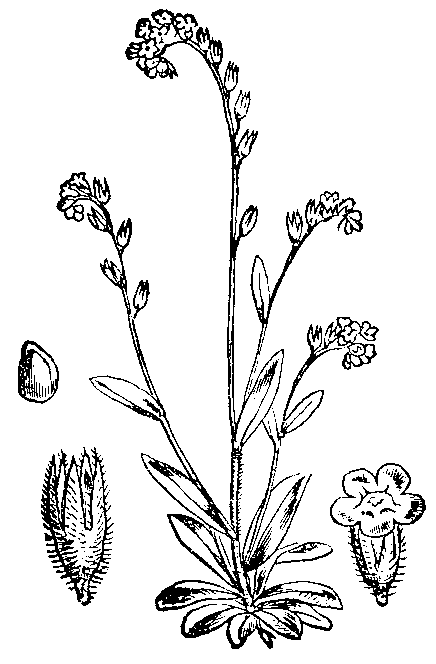
Plate 223 in Martin Cilenšek's Naše škodljive rastline (1892)
