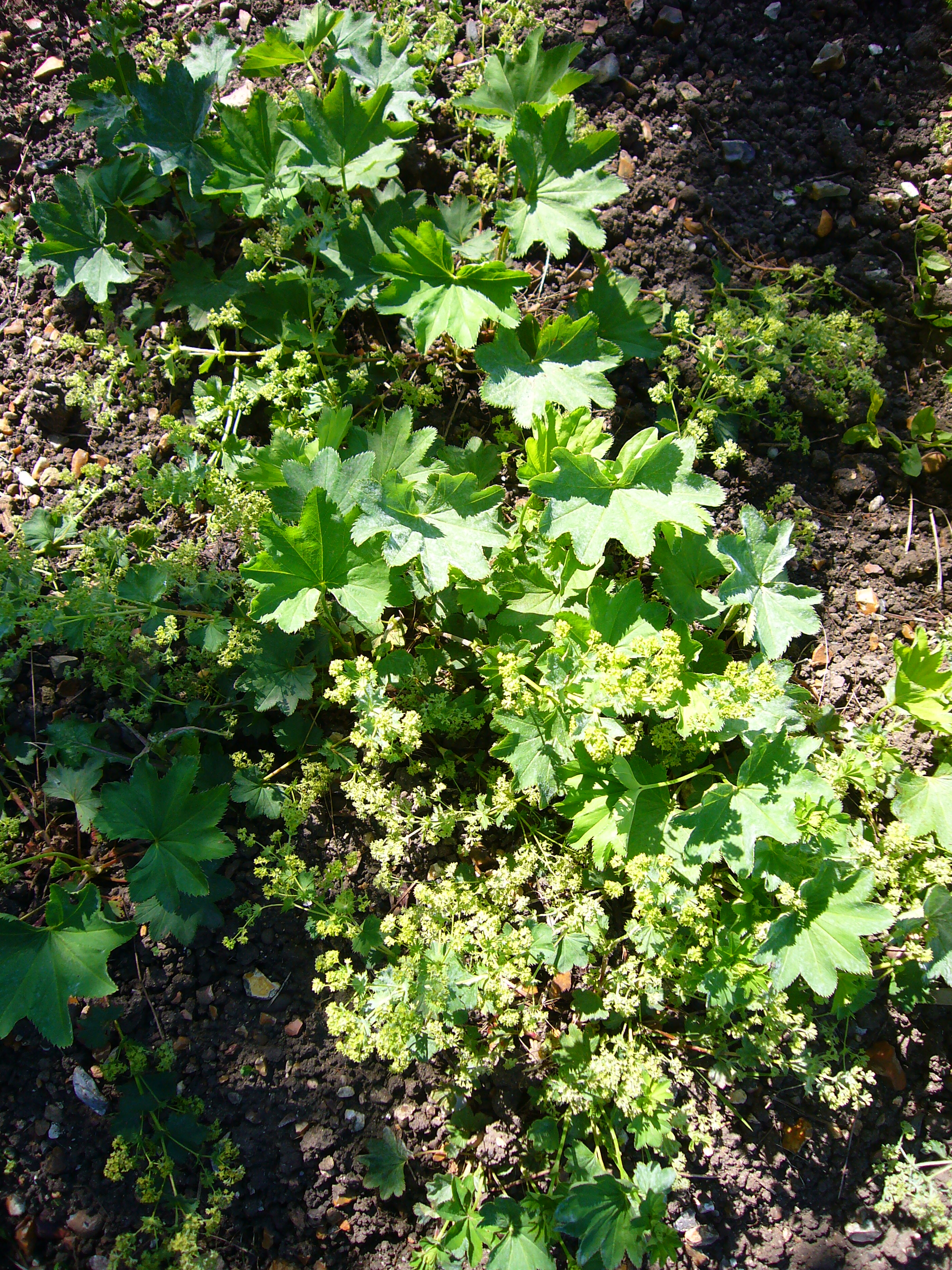

Scientific classification
- Kingdom: Plantae
- Clade: Tracheophytes
- Clade: Angiosperms
- Clade: Eudicots
- Clade: Rosids
- Order: Rosales
- Family: Rosaceae
- Genus: Alchemilla
- Species: A. glabra

Binomial name
- Alchemilla glabra Neygenf.

= Alchemilla glabra =

Species of flowering plant

Alchemilla glabra is a species of plants belonging to the family Rosaceae.

It is native to Eurasia.
