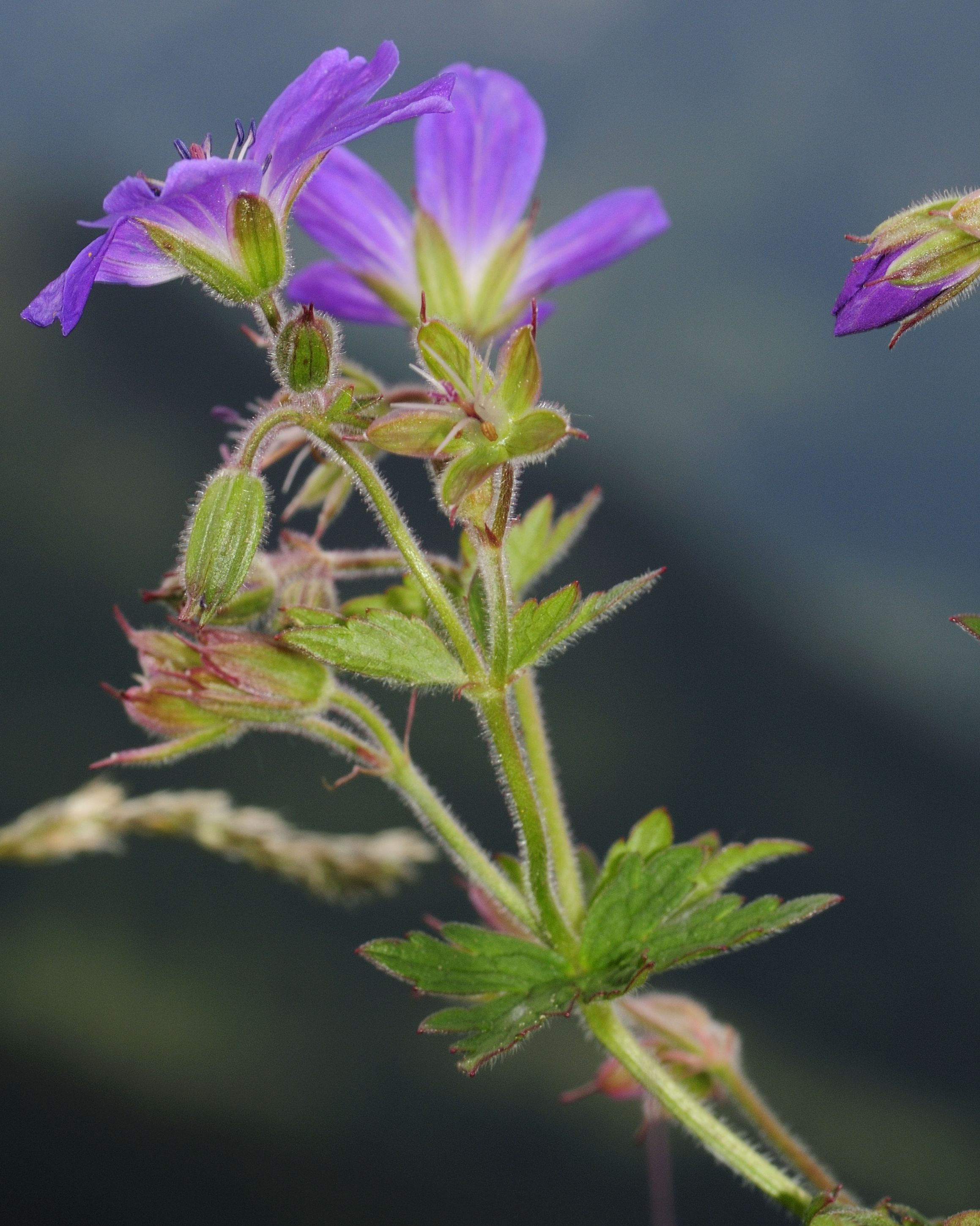

Scientific classification
- Kingdom: Plantae
- Clade: Tracheophytes
- Clade: Angiosperms
- Clade: Eudicots
- Clade: Rosids
- Order: Geraniales
- Family: Geraniaceae
- Genus: Geranium
- Species: G. sylvaticum

Binomial name
- Geranium sylvaticum L.

= Geranium sylvaticum =

Species of flowering plant

Geranium sylvaticum, the wood cranesbill or woodland geranium, is a species of hardy flowering plant in the family Geraniaceae, native to Europe and northern Turkey.

The Latin specific epithet sylvaticum means "of woodland", referring to the plant's native habitat, as does its common name "wood cranesbill".

== Description ==
The plant grows to 75 cm (30 in) tall by 60 cm (24 in) wide, it is a mound-forming herbaceous, gynodioecious perennial with deeply cut and toothed 7-lobed basal leaves. In summer, flowers are borne on stalks with ruffs of leaves. The flower colour ranges from mauve to sky blue, depending on soil conditions. It has 10 stamens and glandular-hairy fruits.

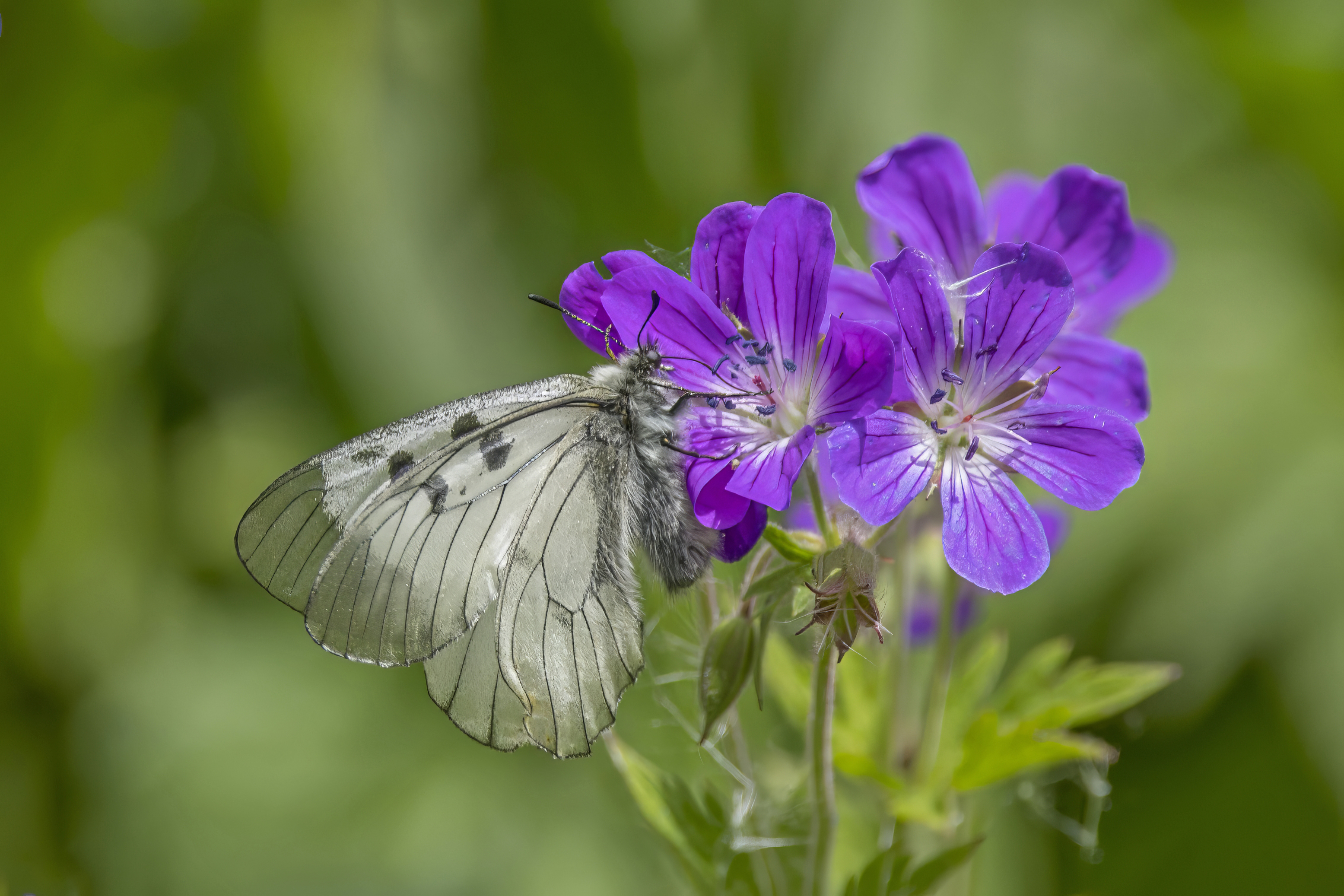
Parnassius mnemosyne nectaring

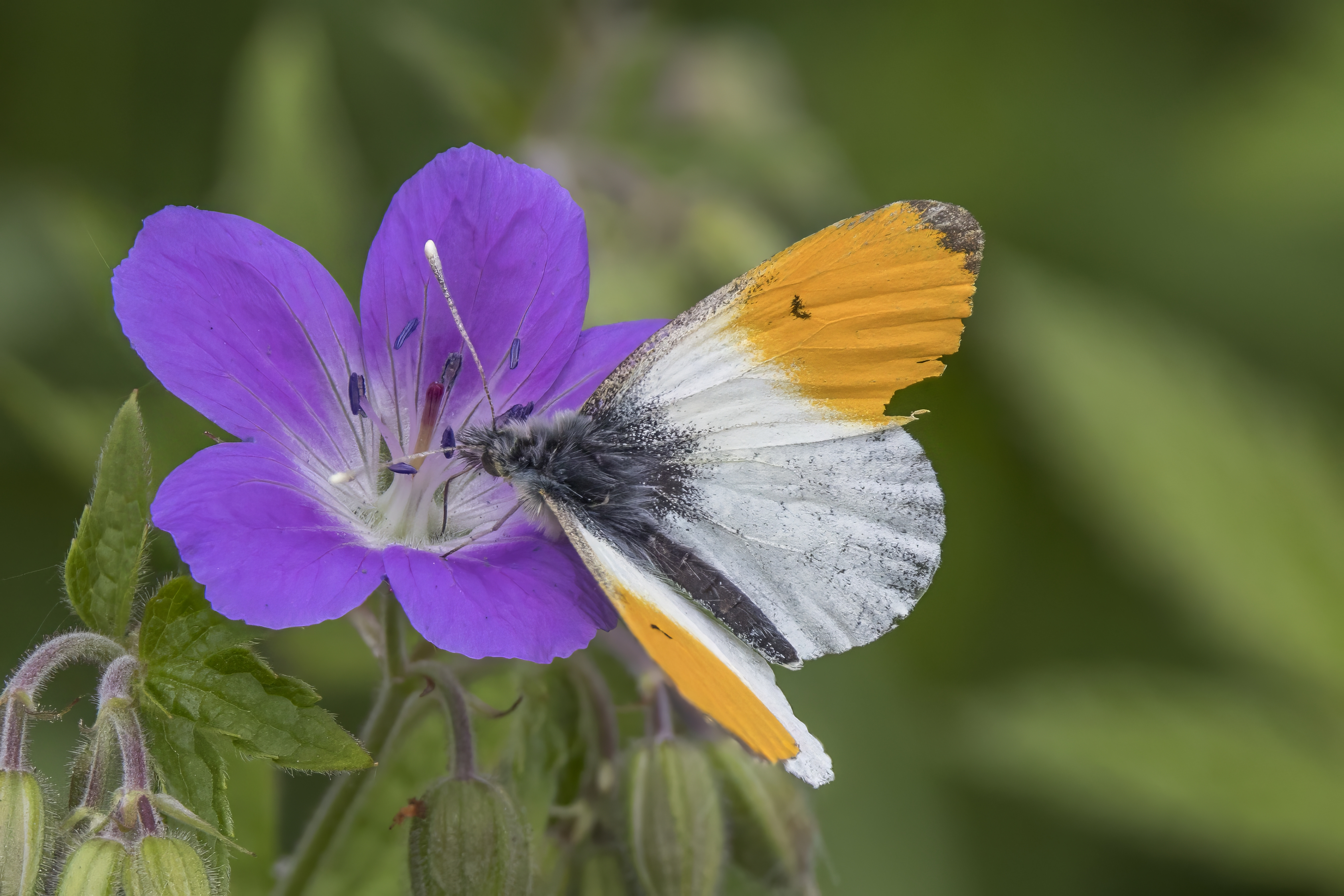
Anthocharis cardamines nectaring

== Cultivation ==
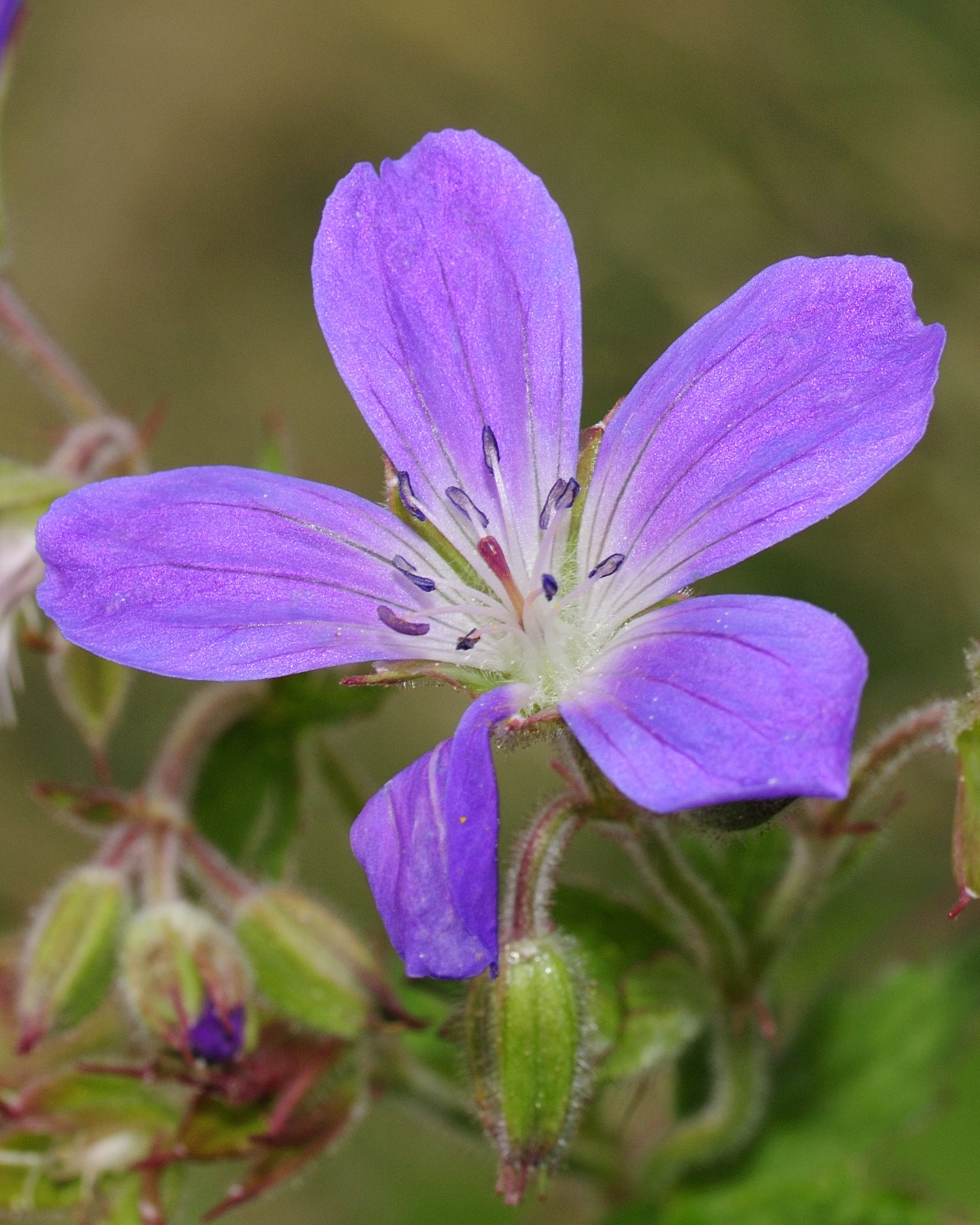
Flower detail

G. sylvaticum is one of many Geranium species which are valued in gardens. It is suitable for cultivation in temperate climates in reliably moist, lightly shaded positions, as the name suggests. It is particularly useful for underplanting deciduous trees, roses, lilies, and other summer-flowering subjects. Various cultivars have been selected, of which 'Album' and 'Mayflower' have gained the Royal Horticultural Society's Award of Garden Merit.

== Uses and traditions ==
It is the city flower of Sheffield in the United Kingdom.

The flowers yield a blue-gray dye that was used in ancient Europe to dye war cloaks, believing it would protect them in battle. For this reason it was called Odin's Grace.
