= List of Sites of Special Scientific Interest in Northumberland =

This is a list of Sites of Special Scientific Interest (SSSIs) in Northumberland, England.

English Nature, the designating body for SSSIs in England, uses the 1974-1996 county system, and this list follows the same approach. Some sites one may expect to find here could therefore be in the County Durham or Tyne and Wear lists.

For other counties, see List of SSSIs by Area of Search.

== Sites ==
- Allen Confluence Gravels
- Allendale Moors
- Allolee to Walltown
- Alnmouth Saltmarsh and Dunes
- Arcot Hall Grasslands and Ponds
- Aules Hill Meadows
- Bamburgh Coast and Hills
- Bamburgh Dunes
- Barelees Pond
- Barrow Burn Meadows
- Barrow Meadow
- Bavington Crags
- Beltingham River Shingle
- Bewick and Beanley Moors
- Billsmoor Park and Grasslees Wood
- Brada Hill
- Bradford Kames
- Briarwood Banks
- Brunton Bank Quarry
- Burnfoot River Shingle and Wydon Nabb
- Campfield Kettle Hole
- Castle Point to Cullernose Point
- Catton Lea Meadow
- Close House Riverside
- College Valley Woodlands
- Colour Heugh and Bowden Doors
- Coquet Island
- Corbridge Limestone Quarry
- Cottonshope Head Quarry
- Cresswell and Newbiggin Shores
- Cresswell Ponds
- Darras Hall Grassland
- Derwent Gorge and Horsleyhope Ravine (part is in County Durham)
- Durtrees Burn Grassland
- Fallowfield Mine
- Fallowlees Flush
- Farne Islands
- Ford Moss
- Geltsdale & Glendue Fells
- Glebe Quarry
- Greenhaugh Meadow
- Greenleighton Quarry
- Gunnerton Nick
- Hadston Links
- Haggburn Gate
- Hannah's Hill, Harehope (delisted)
- Harbottle Moors
- Hareshaw Dene
- Harthope Burn
- Hartley Cleugh
- Hawthorn Cottage Pasture
- Heatheryburn Bank
- Hesleyside Park
- Hexhamshire Moors
- High Knock Shield Meadow
- Holburn Lake and Moss
- Holystone Burn Woods
- Holystone North Wood
- Holywell Pond
- Howick to Seaton Point
- Humbleton Hill and The Trows
- Irthing Gorge
- Kielder Mires
- Kielderhead and Emblehope Moors
- Knarsdale Meadows
- Lambley River Shingles
- Lampert Mosses
- Linbrigg
- Lindisfarne
- Longhorsley Moor
- Longhoughton Quarry
- Low Hauxley Shore
- Mill and Whiskershiel Burns
- Monk Wood
- Muckle Moss
- Muggleswick, Stanhope and Edmundbyers Commons and Blanchland Moor (part is in County Durham)
- New Hartley Ponds
- New Scroggs
- Newham Fen
- Newton Links
- Ninebanks River Shingle
- Northumberland Shore
- Otterburn Mires
- Peckriding Meadows
- Peckriding Top Lot
- Quarryhouse Moor Ponds (delisted)
- Ramsey's Burn Wood
- Redesdale Ironstone Quarries
- River Coquet and Coquet Valley Woodlands
- River Tyne at Ovingham
- River West Allen at Blackett Bridge
- Roddam Dene
- Roman Wall Escarpments
- Roman Wall Loughs
- Settlingstones Mine
- Simonside Hills
- Spindlestone Heughs
- Stawardpeel Woods
- Stonecroft Mine
- The Allers and Lilburn Valley Junipers
- The Bog
- The Cheviot
- The Scroggs (delisted)
- Thorneyburn Meadow
- Till Riverbanks
- Tipalt Burn
- Tweed Catchment Rivers - England: Lower Tweed and Whiteadder
- Tweed Catchment Rivers - England: Till Catchment
- Tyne Watersmeet
- Warks Burn Woodland
- Warkworth Dunes and Saltmarsh
- Wharmley Riverside
- White Ridge Meadow
- Whitfield Moor, Plenmeller and Asholme Commons
- Williamston River Shingle
- Willow Burn Pasture
