= Bamburgh Coast and Hills =

Protected area in Northumberland, England

- Site of Special Scientific Interest
- Location within Northumberland
- Location of Bamburgh Coast and Hills.
- Area of search: Northumberland
- Grid reference: NU167355
- Coordinates: 55.616990°N 1.732567°W
- Interest: Biological and Geological
- Area: 56.5 hectares (140 acres)
- Notification date: 1954
- Location map: DEFRA MAGIC map

Bamburgh Coast and Hills is the name given to a Site of Special Scientific Interest (SSSI) on the coast of north Northumberland, England. The site is one of the longest-standing SSSIs in England, having been listed since 1954, and displays the interaction of a fluid magma rock, now known as the Whin Sill, interacting with older sedimentary rock. Coastal erosion at the site enables sections of the geological strata to be seen. In turn, the soil associated with the Whin Sill gives rise to a distinct pattern of vegetation which on its own merits is at this site found notable.

== Location and natural features ==
The Bamburgh Coast and Hills SSSI is situated on the east coast of the far north-east of England, in the county of Northumberland, about 1 mile (1.6 km) north-east of the town of Bamburgh. The site is 'T'shaped, the bar of the T running for approximately 1 mile (1.6 km) along the north-west - south-east orientated beachfront north of Bamburgh, and the descender running inland for some 0.9 miles (1.4 km) following a south-east facing escarpment as high ground at circa 60 metres (200 ft) above sea level falls to a new level at circa 30 metres (98 ft). Both the coast and the escarpment expose sections of strata of Whin Sill and underlying rock, making the site advantageous for studies of local geology.

The strata at Bamburgh is complex, and appears to show areas of faults pre-existing the intrusion of the sill, where sedimentary rafts have dipped from the horizontal; intrusions by the whin sill; and faults occurring after the intrusion, delineated by carbonite-filled fractures, and the occurrence of barytes.

== Vegetation ==
The Whin Sill is an igneous rock, Dolerite, which gives rise to a soil chemistry particular to the location, and thus to a distinct habitat for vegetation. Soil on the Whin Sill is thin and prone to drought in summer months. Plant species found at the site include the Perennial plant wild onion (Allium vineale), maiden pink (Dianthus deltoides), common rockrose (Helianthemum nummularium), meadow oat-grass (Avenula pratensis) and crested hair-grass (Koeleria macrantha). Annual plants including knotted clover (Trifolium striatum), forget-me-nots (Myosotis spp), dove's-foot cranesbill (Geranium molle), parsley-piert (Aphanes arvensis), heath groundsel (Senecio sylvaticus) and squirreltail fescue (Vulpia bromoides). More acidic areas provide habitat for sheep's fescue (Festuca ovina) and bell heather (Erica cinerea).

A number of plants characteristic of the coastal location are found, including thrift (Armeria maritima), buck's-horn plantain (Plantago coronopus), common stork's-bill (Erodium cicutarium) and sea plantain (Plantago maritima). Heath areas exhibit heather (Calluna vulgaris) and bell heather with meadow oat-grass, bitter vetch (Lathyrus montanus), devil's-bit scabious (Succisa pratensis), hawkweeds (Hieracium spp), wood anemone (Anemone nemorosa) and the uncommon mountain everlasting (Antennaria dioica).

Areas fed by freshwater springs support common butterwort (Pinguicula vulgaris), grass-of-Parnassus (Parnassia palustris), marsh lousewort (Pedicularis palustris), marsh pennywort (Hydrocotyle vulgaris), marsh arrowgrass (Triglochin palustris), sea arrowgrass (Triglochin maritima) and the rare seaside centaury (Centaurium littorale).

The condition of the geological units of Bamburgh Coast and Hills was judged to be favourable in 2009 & 2014, however the two vegetative units were judged to be unfavourable-declining and unfavourable-no change, condition reports citing encroaching gorse (Ulex spp) and competitive grasses, and a complete lack of planned management.

== See also ==
- List of Sites of Special Scientific Interest in Northumberland
