= Brada Hill =

Hill in Northumberland, England

- Site of Special Scientific Interest
- Location within Northumberland
- Location of Brada Hill.
- Area of search: Northumberland
- Grid reference: NU161340
- Coordinates: 55.599293°N 1.745023°W
- Interest: Biological
- Area: 2.4 hectares (6 acres)
- Notification date: 1986
- Location map: DEFRA MAGIC map

Brada Hill is a small hill escarpment near the coast of north Northumberland in North East England, designated as a Site of Special Scientific Interest (SSSI). The 2.4 hectares (5.9 acres) site is an outcropping of a local stone group, the Whin Sill, on which grows a range of flora representative of the thin, drought-prone soil conditions and influenced by the underlying geology.

== Location and natural features ==
Brada Hill is a small quarried hill situated 1.3 miles (2.1 km) west-south-west of the coastal town of Bamburgh in Northumberland and 1 mile (1.6 km) south of Budle Bay. The hill has a pronounced semicircular southern escarpment falling from 77 metres (253 ft) to 65 metres (213 ft) above sea level, exposing the Winn Sill's dolerite stone; this is the focus of the SSSI, which extends to 2.4 hectares (5.9 acres) and is concerned with the assemblage of flora suited to very well drained thin soil. The surrounding land is pastoral farmland; Spinglestone Heughs and Bradford Kames SSSIs are 0.5 miles (0.80 km) to the west and the south-west.

== Vegetation ==
Brada Hill's escarpment has flourishing populations of plants suited to a thin dry soil, including maiden pink (Dianthus deltoides) and wild onion (Allium vineale) amidst red fescue (Festuca rubra), crested hair-grass (Koeleria macrantha) and early hair-grass (Aira praecox). Annual flora at the site include hare's-foot clover (Trifolium arvense), knotted trefoil (T. striatum), forget-me-not (Myosotis spp.) and dove's-tail cranesbill (Geranium molle) Perennial flora include common rock-rose (Helianthemum nummularium), biting stonecrop (Sedum acre) and meadow oat-grass (Avenula pratensis). A number of coarse grasses including false oat-grass (Arrhenatherum elatius), and herbs including red campion (Silene dioica), hogweed (Heracleum sphondylium) and common nettle (Urtica dioica), grow in isolated areas of deeper soil. Heath pearlwort (Sagina subulata), as well as grasses, wild onion and maiden pink grow amidst slab rocks which form the hill top. Despite proximity with the sea, maritime flora is not found at the site.

The condition of Brada Hill was judged to be favourable in 2009.

== See also ==
- List of Sites of Special Scientific Interest in Northumberland
