= Bavington Crags =

Site of Special Scientific Interest in north Northumberland, England

- Site of Special Scientific Interest
- Location within Northumberland
- Location of Bavington Crags.
- Area of search: Northumberland
- Grid reference: NY981805
- Coordinates: 55.119918°N 2.030256°W
- Interest: Biological
- Area: 4.4 hectares (11 acres)
- Notification date: 1954
- Location map: DEFRA MAGIC map

Bavington Crags is a Site of Special Scientific Interest (SSSI) in north Northumberland, England. The site is an outcropping of the Whin Sill which gives rise to distinctive flora particular to the thin soil conditions on this bedrock.

== Location and natural features ==
Bavington Crags is a field 4.4 hectares (11 acres) in area, in the north-east of England in the centre of the county of Northumberland, some 0.25 miles (0.40 km) north-west of the village of Great Bavington. The crags are situated on gently falling farmland, at 230 metres (750 ft) above sea level.

The crags are an outcropping of the Whin Sill, an igneous rock, dolerite, associated with magma flows from ancient volcanos. It gives rise to areas of thin soils, prone to drought in summer, and having a particular soil chemistry supporting a distinct flora set. The site exposes sections of low vertical crag, as well as dip-slope slabs of the Whin Sill

== Vegetation ==
Bavington Crags is situated within an area of acid grassland characterised by an abundance of crested dog’s-tail (Cynosurus cristatus) and mat-grass (Nardus stricta). The dip-slope areas of the site provide a habitat for, unusual to Northumberland, chives (Allium schoenoprasum), hairy stonecrop (Sedum villosum) bristle club-rush (Isolepis setacea), changing forget-me-not (Myosotis discolor), field madder (Sherardia arvensis), and early hair-grass (Aira praecox). Maiden pink (Dianthus deltoides) is found in dry soil on ledges. Wetter areas exhibit mat-grass, carnation sedge (Carex panicea), spring sedge (C. caryophyllea), cuckoo flower (Cardamine pratensis), red fescue (Festuca rubra), wild thyme (Thymus praecox), salad burnet (Sanguisorba minor) and lady’s bedstraw (Galium verum).

The condition of Bavington Crags was judged to be unfavourable-recovering in 2012, due to an unusually wet summer in that year affecting growth on the slabs.

== See also ==
- List of Sites of Special Scientific Interest in Northumberland
