= Water buttercup =

Water buttercup is a common name for several plants and may refer to:

- Ranunculus aquatilis, the white water buttercup
- Ranunculus flabellaris, the yellow water buttercup
