= Alnmouth Saltmarsh and Dunes =

SSSI in Northumberland, England

- Site of Special Scientific Interest
- Location within Northumberland
- Location of Alnmouth Saltmarsh and Dunes.
- Area of search: Northumberland
- Grid reference: NU245100
- Coordinates: 55.37986°N 1.606356°W
- Interest: Biological
- Area: 108.4 hectares (270 acres)
- Notification date: 1988
- Location map: DEFRA MAGIC map

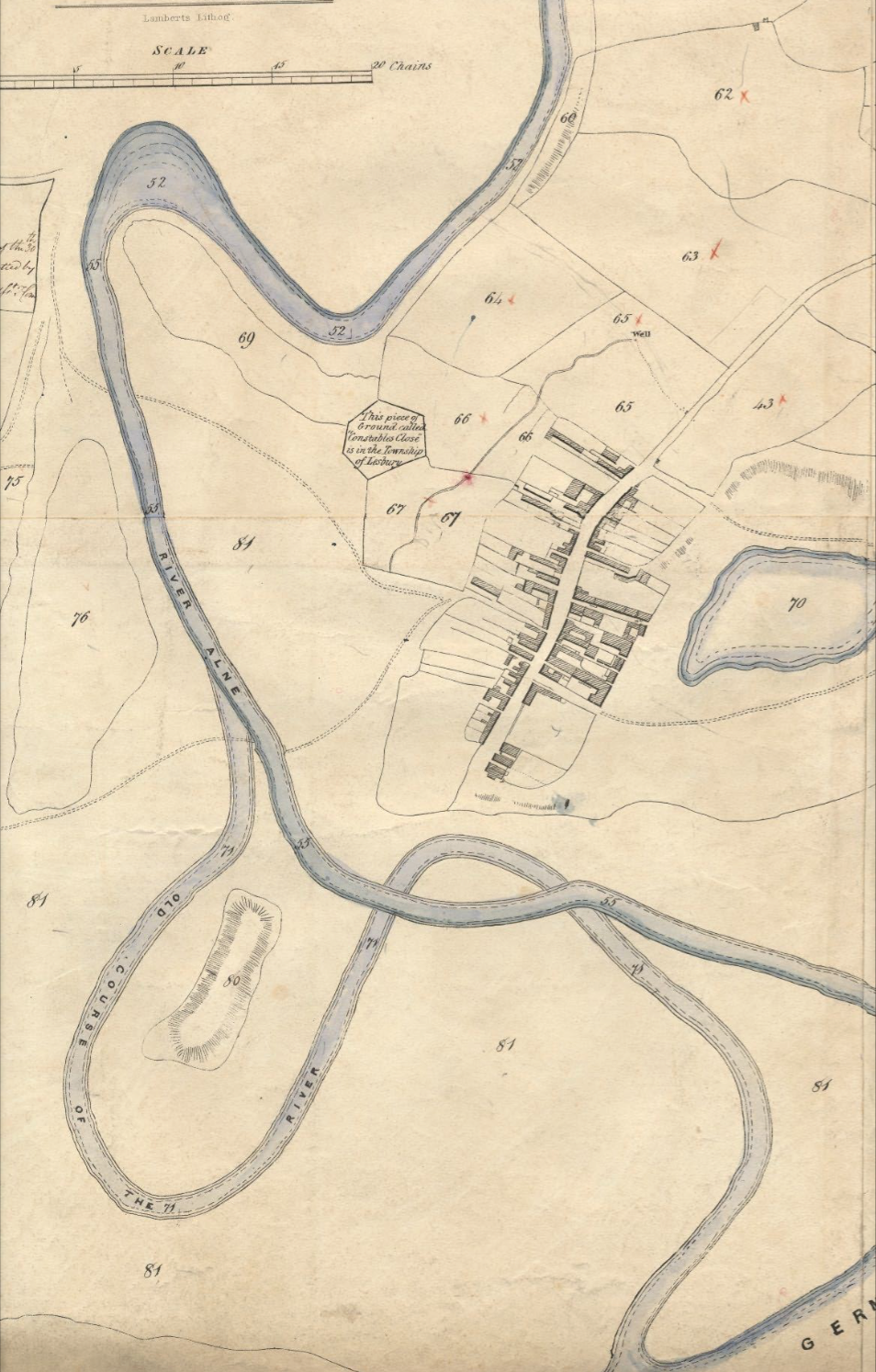
Tithe map of Alnmouth from 1843, showing the changed course of the River Aln after a storm in 1806 diverted it from an oxbow meander, which now forms the saltmarsh

Alnmouth Saltmarsh and Dunes is a Site of Special Scientific Interest (SSSI) in Northumberland, England. It is the largest saltflat on the north-east coast, located on the south bank of the River Aln estuary, and notable for the varied plant community found on the interface between the saltflats and the dunes. It overlaps with and forms part of the much larger Northumberland Shore SSSI.

== Location and natural features ==
Alnmouth Saltmarsh and Dunes is situated in the north-east of England at Alnmouth, a village at the mouth of the River Aln where it empties into the North Sea on the east coast. The site covers the south bank of the estuary from a point due west of the village, and follows the coast south for about 1.5 miles (2.4 km) to Buston Links, east of High Buston. Warkworth Dunes and Saltmarsh SSSI is immediately to the south, and both fall within the scope of the Northumberland Shore SSSI. The site extends to 108.4 hectares (268 acres) and covers estuarine saltflats and a single ridge of dune extending south from the river mouth.

Alnmouth's saltmarsh owes its origins to a shift in the course of the river which occurred in 1806. Before that time, the river passed to the west of Church Hill at the north-west end of the large single sandbank immediately to the south of the estuary, taking an oxbow course around the hill to discharge slightly south of today's river. A violent storm on Christmas Day in that year allowed the river to break through the northern extent of the sandbank to assume its current course - in the process cutting off and destroying the remains of the village's Church of St. Waleric, which stood at the northern end of the sandbank. The river's previous course became silt-filled, forming much of the saltmarsh now of scientific interest.

=== Vegetation ===
The saltmarsh is ungrazed and is dominated by sea-purslane (Halimione portulacoides) and by the most northerly British colony of the seaweeds Bostrychia scorpioides, Fucus vesiculosus and Pelvetia canaliculata. Higher levels of the marsh support thrift (Armeria maritima), common saltmarsh-grass (Puccinellia maritima), sea-plantain (Plantago maritima) and sea aster (Aster tripolium) associated with the sea-purslane. Much of the intertidal mud has been colonised by common cord-grass (Spartina anglica), but open areas and saltmarsh creeks are used by feeding and roosting gulls, dunlin and other waders including redshank, curlew and snipe.

Common reed (Phragmites australis) and three locally rare species, sea rush (Juncus maritimus), parsley water-dropwort (Oenanthe lachenalii) and slender spike-rush (Eleocharis uniglumis) are found at the freshwater inflow area of the marsh.

A distinct habitat is provided by the interface between saltmarsh and dune and supports reflexed saltmarsh grass (Puccinellia distans), hard-grass (Parapholis strigosa) and sea-milkwort (Glaux maritima). The dune ridge supports marram (Ammophila arenaria), and lesser meadow-rue (Thalictrum minus) with bloody crane's-bill (Geranium sanguineum) and hound's-tongue (Cynoglossum officinale). Bracken (Pteridium aquilinum) is found on the lower landward slopes. The site extends to areas of shorter turf, which supports cowslip (Primula veris), early-purple orchid (Orchis mascula), violets (Viola spp.), and yarrow (Achillea millefolium), with widespread early forget-me-not (Myosotis ramosissima), common cornsalad (Valerianella locusta), hairy tare (Vicia hirsuta), and crosswort (Galium cruciata).

A further distinctive habitat is provided by an area of gravel exposed by historic sand extraction, and on which grows wild thyme (Thymus praecox), common stork's-bill (Erodium cicutarium), mouse-ear hawkweed (Hieracium pilosella) and common centaury (Centaurium erythraea) together with common bird's-foot trefoil (Lotus corniculatus), common restharrow (Ononis repens), blue fleabane (Erigeron acer), crested hair-grass (Koeleria macrantha) and fern-grass (Desmazeria rigida). The margin of this area supports viper's-bugloss (Echium vulgare) and bloody crane's-bill.

=== Condition ===
The site is divided into four units for SSSI management purposes. The condition of all was rated "favourable" in 2007 (units 1 & 2) and 2009 (units 3 & 4).

== Ownership ==
The site is owned by Northumberland Estates, the estate company of Ralph Percy, 12th Duke of Northumberland, and is leased to the National Trust.

== See also ==
- List of Sites of Special Scientific Interest in Northumberland
