= New Hartley Ponds =

Protected area in Northumberland, England

- Site of Special Scientific Interest
- Location within Northumberland
- Location of New Hartley Ponds.
- Area of search: Northumberland
- Grid reference: NZ 305764
- Coordinates: 55.080602°N 1.522830°W
- Interest: Biological
- Area: 1.58 hectares (3.9 acres)
- Notification date: 1984
- Location map: DEFRA MAGIC map

New Hartley Ponds is the name given to a Site of Special Scientific Interest (SSSI) in south-east Northumberland, England. The site comprises six seasonal ponds listed for their vegetation and newt population.

== Location and natural features ==
New Hartley Ponds is situated in the north-east of England in the county of Northumberland, on the south-west fringe of the village of New Hartley. The ponds lie at 30 metres (98 ft) above sea level on flat terrain, some 2.7 kilometres (1.7 mi) inland from the North Sea. The six ponds on the 1.58 hectares (3.9 acres) site are seasonal in nature.

== Flora and fauna ==
The ponds are breeding grounds for five species of amphibians; notably the great-crested newt (Triturus cristatus), a species protected in the UK under Section 5 of the Wildlife and Countryside Act 1981, which at New Hartley can number 500 individuals. Populations of up to 1000 smooth newts (Lissotriton vulgaris), and occasional palmate newts (Lissotriton helveticus) are also found. Frogs and toads, numbering approximately 150 individuals each, and also found. The ponds are also home to two species of Damselfly - the blue-tailed damselfly (Ischnura elegans) and the common darter (Sympetrum striolatum).

Vegetation at the ponds includes amphibious bistort (Polygonum amphibium), common spike-rush (Eleocharis palustris), water horsetail (Equisetum fluviatile) and water crowfoot (Ranunculus aquatilis).

The condition of New Hartley Ponds was judged to be favourable, and described as 'outstanding' in 2010, with concerns expressed as to newts getting trapped in gully pots on the New Hartley Road.

== See also ==
- List of Sites of Special Scientific Interest in Northumberland
