= Otterburn Mires =

Protected area in Northumberland, England

- Site of Special Scientific Interest
- Location within Northumberland
- Location of Otterburn Mires.
- Area of search: Northumberland
- Grid reference: NT850049
- Coordinates: 55.337911°N 2.2380232°W
- Area: 725.6 acres (2.936 km^{2}; 1.134 sq mi)
- Notification date: 2000

Otterburn Mires is a Site of Special Scientific Interest made up of eight separate patches of land. It is located within Northumberland National Park, in Northumberland, England, 3km east of Byrness, (east of Cottonshope burn, above Cottonshopeburnfoot).

Otterburn Mires was designated as a protected area because it represents examples of several types of mire (blanket bog), still existing in Northumberland. These protected habitat patches include watershed mire (located on plateaus, and thus gains its water supply from rain) as well as spur mire and saddle mire that gain their water supply from ground water flow.

Moss species in these mires include Sphagnum papillosum, Sphagnum cuspidatum, Sphagnum recurvum and Sphagnum capillifolium.

Bird species recorded in this protected area include golden plover and black grouse.

All of the land designated as Otterburn Mires SSSI is owned by the Ministry of Defence and is located within Otterburn Training Area (access is closed when red flags are flying).
