= Longhoughton Quarry =

- Site of Special Scientific Interest
- Location within Northumberland
- Location of Longhoughton Quarry.
- Area of search: Northumberland
- Grid reference: NU229152
- Coordinates: 55.430663°N 1.636646°W
- Interest: Geological
- Area: 6.7 hectares (17 acres)
- Notification date: 1968
- Location map: DEFRA MAGIC map

Longhoughton Quarry is a Site of Special Scientific Interest (SSSI) in north Northumberland in North East England. The site is a now disused quarry which yielded whinstone, a hard dark rock associated in Northumberland with the Whin Sill.

== Location and natural features ==
Longhoughton Quarry is situated 0.9 miles (1.4 km) west of Longhoughton, a coastal village in Northumberland. The SSSI covers an area of 6.7 hectares (17 acres). The quarry displays intrusions of the igneous rock dolerite beneath a Great Limestone stratum, and shows variously the incorporation of blocks of sedimentary rock; baking of sedimentary rock, and the delineation of ancient watercourses.

The condition of Longhoughton Quarry was judged to be favourable in 2009.

== See also ==
- List of Sites of Special Scientific Interest in Northumberland
