= Ramsey's Burn Wood =

Protected area in Northumberland, England

- Site of Special Scientific Interest
- Location within Northumberland
- Location of Ramsey's Burn Wood.
- Area of search: Northumberland
- Grid reference: NT875027
- Coordinates: 55°19′7″N 2°11′51″W
- Area: 36.0 acres (0.15 km^{2}; 0.056 sq mi)
- Notification date: 1986

Ramsey's Burn Wood is a Site of Special Scientific Interest (SSSI) within Northumberland National Park, Northumberland, England. This protected area is a woodland dominated by alder trees located north of the village of Otterburn. The protected area is within the Otterburn Training Area that is used for military training.

This site was formerly notified as part of Harbottle Moors SSSI.

== Details ==
The woodland of alder trees has developed from a former coppice. Plant species in this protected area include sanicle, toothwort, common valerian, marsh hawk's-beard, opposite-leaved golden saxifrage and fragrant orchid. The woodland also contains bluebells.

The woodland contains a diversity of lichens. Lichen species include Thelotrema lepadinum, Lecidea quernea and members of the genera Ochrolechia and Pertusaria.

The site has been fenced to exclude grazing animals.

== Land ownership ==
All of the land within Ramsey's Burn Wood SSSI is owned by the Ministry of Defence. Ramsey's Burn Wood SSSI is within the Otterburn Training Area (access is closed when red flags are flying).
