= Burnfoot River Shingle and Wydon Nabb =

Nature reserve in Northumberland, England

- Site of Special Scientific Interest
- Location within Northumberland
- Location of Burnfoot River Shingle and Wydon Nabb.
- Area of search: Northumberland
- Grid reference: NY689624
- Coordinates: 54.95670°N 2.48407°W
- Interest: Mixed
- Area: 20.3 hectares (50 acres)
- Notification date: 1987
- Location map: DEFRA MAGIC map

Burnfoot River Shingle and Wydon Nabb is the name given to a Site of Special Scientific Interest (SSSI) in Northumberland, North East England. Burnfoot River Shingle is a calaminarian grassland on the River South Tyne where the local flora is influenced by high levels of naturally occurring heavy metals. Wydon Nabb is an escarpment displaying the Haltwhistle Dyke, a magmatic intrusion of igneous dolerite set amidst sedimentary sandstone and shale.

This protected area is owned by the National Trust, as part of its Bellister Castle estate.

== Location and natural features ==
The Burnfoot River Shingle and Wydon Nabb site is situated in the south-west of Northumberland, some 0.9 miles (1.4 km) south-west of the town of Haltwhistle. The Burnfoot River Shingle element of the site is a 0.8 miles (1.3 km) length of River South Tyne riverbanks, running in a north-easterly direction at about 120 metres (390 ft) above sea level and extending to 17.9 hectares (44 acres). Wydon Nabb is an escarpment situated at the north-east of the site, falling from 148 metres (486 ft) to the river-level.

== Geology ==
Wydon Nabb constitutes the site’s feature of geological interest; it is a south-facing oxbow escarpment above the river, one part of which is a 6 metres (20 ft) -wide intrusion of magmatic dolerite rock through the surrounding horizontal sedimentary rock strata of sandstone and shale. The intruded rock, termed a dyke and named for the nearby town - Haltwhistle Dyke - is part of the much larger Whin Sill, an igneous rock formed from magma upwellings into and through fractures caused by crustal extension of local tectonic plates some 295 million years ago.

== Vegetation ==
Burnfoot River Shingle, grasslands on both banks of the River South Tyne, constitutes the site’s feature of biological interest. The river drains a watershed including parts of the Northern Pennine Orefield, as a result of which high levels of heavy metal have built up in the river shingle, and on this thrive a community of metal-tolerant plants. Common across the site are alpine penny-cress (Noccaea caerulescens), spring sandwort (Minuartia verna), common scurvy-grass (Cochlearia officinalis agg.), mountain pansy (Viola lutea) and thrift (Armeria maritima).

A number of distinct habitats are found at the site. Parts of the shingle with more moderate toxicity support short grasses such as sheep’s fescue (Festuca ovina), or taller grasses including false oat-grass (Arrhena therum elatius) and common knapweed (Centaurea nigra). Amongst these are found a number of species associated with limestone including kidney vetch (Anthyllis vulneraria), purging flax (Linum catharticum) and small scabious (Scabiosa columbaria).

Downy birch (Betula pubescens), common sallow (Salix caprea) and alder (Alnus glutinosa) grow on sections of the site, beneath which can be found the narrow-lipped helleborine (Epipactis leptochila), characteristic of metalliferous sites in Northumberland and uncommon elsewhere. Ash (Fraxinus excelsior), hazel (Corylus avellana) and sessile oak (Quercus petraea) form woodlands at the outer margins of the site.

Water crowfoot (Ranunculus aquatilis) and water plantain (Alisma plantago-aquatica) are found in pools left by river channel migration, and surrounding fens support horsetail (Equisetum fluviatile), bottle sedge (Carex rostrata) and meadowsweet (Filipendula ulmaria).

The condition of Burnfoot River Shingle was judged to be unfavourable-declining in 2011. Invasive species are encroaching on the site in part because of lower levels of heavy metals in the contemporary river, (most mining having ceased in the watershed) and due to insufficient intervention. Wydon Nabb was judged favourable in the same year.

== See also ==
- List of Sites of Special Scientific Interest in Northumberland
