= Goosetongue =

Goosetongue is a common name for several plants and may refer to:

- Achillea ptarmica, native to Europe and western Asia
- Galium aparine
- Melissa officinalis
- Plantago maritima
