= Arcot Hall Grasslands and Ponds =

Protected area in Northumberland, England

- Site of Special Scientific Interest
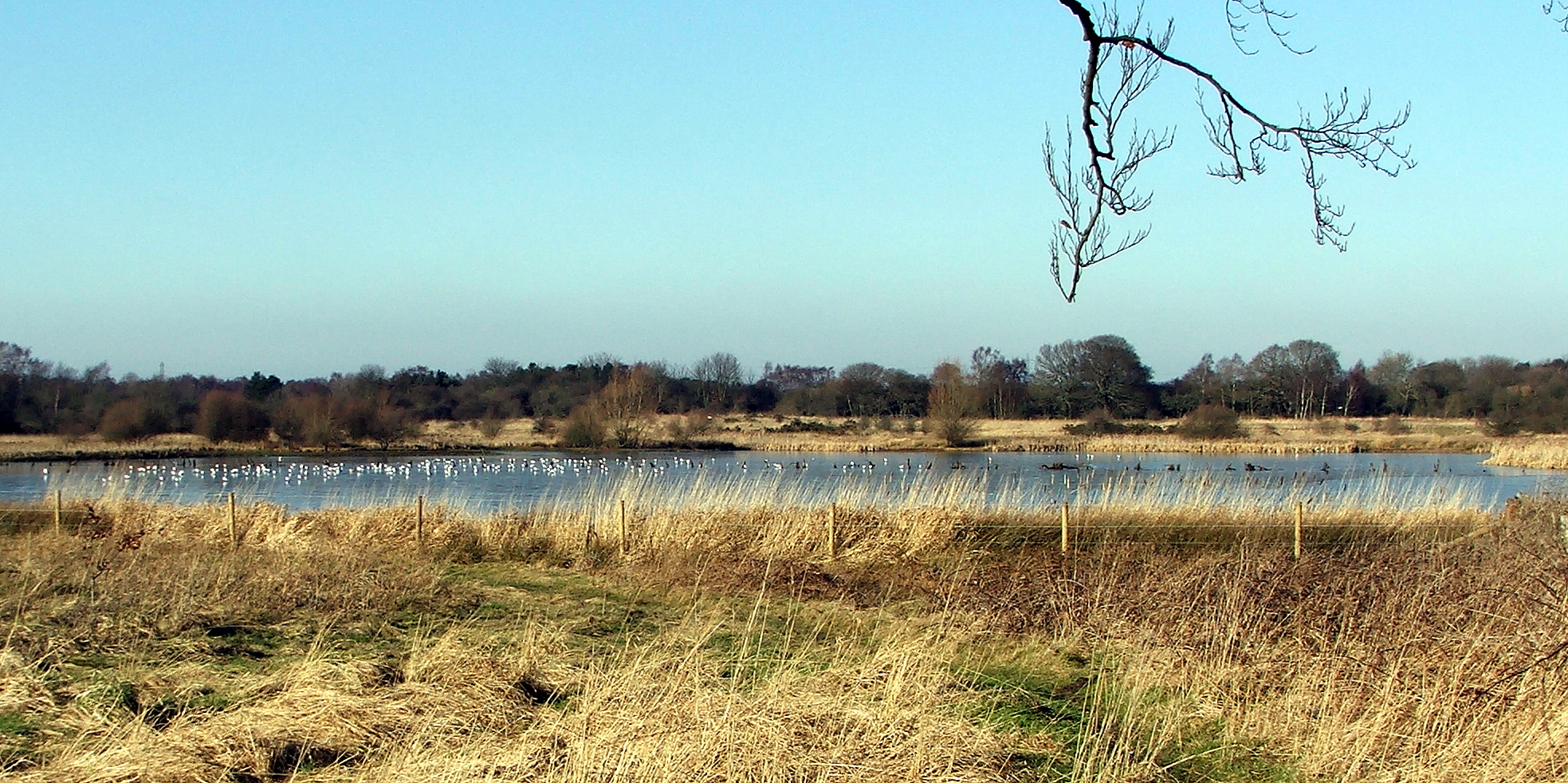
- Arcot Pond

- Location within Northumberland
- Location of Arcot Hall Grasslands and Ponds.
- Area of search: Northumberland
- Grid reference: NZ249755
- Coordinates: 55.07716°N 1.60744°W
- Interest: Biological
- Area: 68.08 hectares (170 acres)
- Notification date: 1986
- Location map: DEFRA MAGIC map

Arcot Hall Grasslands and Ponds is the name given to a Site of Special Scientific Interest (SSSI) near Cramlington in Northumberland, England, notable as the largest lowland species-rich grassland in North East England. The site is composed of grassland, heath, ponds, and associated damp habitats now rare in Northumberland.

== Origin of the name ==
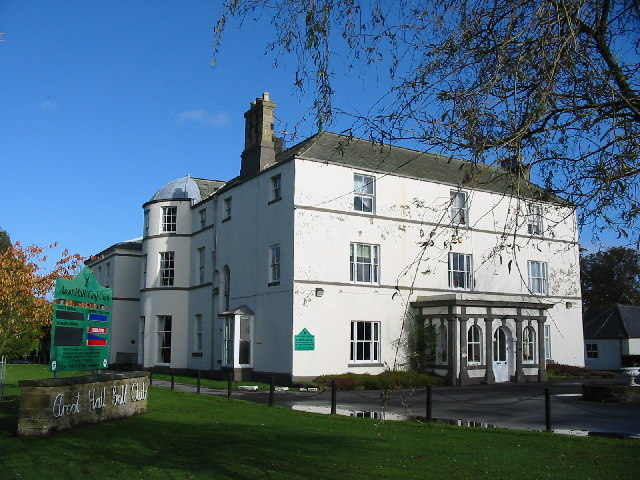
Arcot Hall

Arcot Hall got its name from Arcot, Tamil Nadu, India. The land's original owner Robert Storey was physician to the Nabob of Arcot, and was involved in the Battle of Arcot. Storey's estate sold the land in Cramlington on to George Shum, who built Arcot Hall. The grasslands and ponds lie adjacent to a golf club.

== Location and natural features ==
Arcot Hall Grasslands and Ponds is located in the north-east of England on 68.08 hectares (168.2 acres) of land situated to the south-east of the town of Cramlington. The A1068 at its south-east extent forms an easterly boundary for the area of the site, and the A19 at its north-east extent forms the southern boundary. The site is at about 70 metres (230 ft) above sea level, within a relatively flat terrain of farmland with encroaching residential and industrial areas - notably the development of Cramington new town from 1958 onwards.

The site covers a spectrum of habitats running from an inundated pond area, through wet and dry grassland and heath, to woodland. It is considered to be of regional importance for its invertebrate population, including 33 species of water-beetle. The site also provides a habitat for nationally rare Least Minor moth, Photedes captiuncula. The wet areas of the site are relatively new, arising out of upwelling water from circa 1966 onwards, and so exhibit early stages of vegetative colonisation.

=== Vegetation ===
The grassland sections of the site are colonised by adder's-tongue Ophioglossum vulgatum and dyer's greenweed Genista tinctoria, both uncommon in Northumberland, as well as yellow rattle Rhinanthus minor, common knapweed Centaurea nigra, common milkwort Polygala vulgaris, cat's-ear Hypochaeris radicata, eyebright Euphrasia officinalis, and common spotted and lesser butterfly orchida Dactylorhiza fuchsii and Platanthera bifolia.

Acid grassland on the site is a habitat for mat-grass Nardus stricta, tormentil Potentilla erecta, heath-grass Danthonia decumbens, devil's-bit scabious Succisa pratensis and betony Stachys officinalis, as well as, in wetter areas, glaucous sedge Carex flacca and pepper-saxifrage Silaum silaus.

Heathland on the site is dominated by heather Calluna vulgaris. Scrub areas are composed of birch, hawthorn Crataegus monogyna, gorse Ulex europaeus, blackthorn Prunus spinosa bramble Rubus fruticosus and creeping soft-grass Holcus mollis.

Wetter areas of the site are dominated by soft rush Juncus effusus, and stable wet areas exhibit Sphagnum moss. Other areas have sharp-flowered rush Juncus acutiflorus and herbs such as water mint Mentha aquatica and sneezewort Achillea ptarmica. The bulrush Typha latifolia, floating sweet-grass Glyceria fluitans and common spike-rush Eleocharis palustris are also found.

=== Condition ===
The site is divided into three units for SSSI management purposes; all were rated "unfavourable - recovering" in 2011. The condition threat risk for two of the units is rated as high.

== See also ==
- List of Sites of Special Scientific Interest in Northumberland
