= Durtrees Burn Grassland =

Protected area in Northumberland, England

- Site of Special Scientific Interest
- Location within Northumberland
- Location of Durtrees Burn Grassland.
- Area of search: Northumberland
- Grid reference: NY869977
- Coordinates: 55.273269°N 2.2077312°W
- Area: 9.6 acres (0.03885 km^{2}; 0.01500 sq mi)
- Notification date: 1988

Durtrees Burn Grassland is a Site of Special Scientific Interest (SSSI) in Northumberland National Park, Northumberland, England. It is located north of the village of Otterburn.

== Details ==
Durtrees Burn Grassland includes grassland containing water avens, devils-bit scabious, globeflower, marsh valerian, fragrant orchid and northern hawk's-beard (Crepis mollis).

The protected area also includes mire habitat. The herb burnet saxifrage has been recorded from the site. The tree species alder and eared willow have also been recorded from this protected area.

== Land ownership ==
All the land designated as Durtrees Burn Grassland SSSI is owned by the Ministry of Defence and is located within Otterburn Training Area (access is closed when red flags are flying).
