= Beltingham =

Village in Northumberland, England

Coordinates: 54.966°N 2.337°W

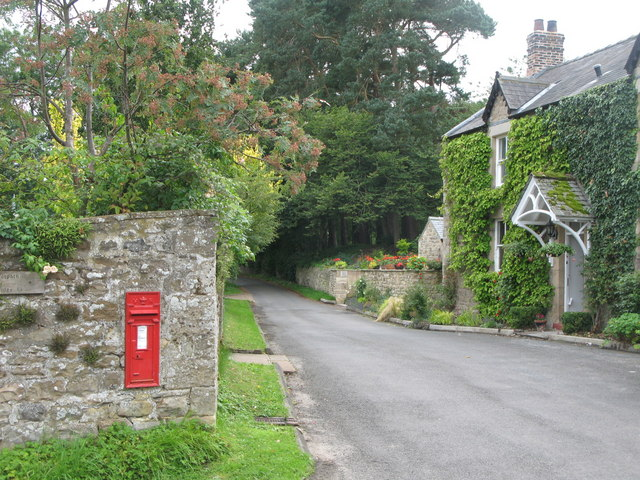
- Victorian postbox at Beltingham

- Location within Northumberland
- OS grid reference: NY785635
- Unitary authority: Northumberland
- Ceremonial county: Northumberland
- Region: North East
- Country: England
- Sovereign state: United Kingdom
- Post town: HEXHAM
- Postcode district: NE47
- Police: Northumbria
- Fire: Northumberland
- Ambulance: North East
- UK Parliament: Hexham

Beltingham /ˈbɛltɪndʒəm/ is a small village on the River South Tyne in Northumberland, in England. It is situated 1 mile (2 km) southeast of Bardon Mill and 10 miles (16 km) to the west of Hexham. In the village, stone houses surround a small green with flowering gardens. There is a Georgian house near the church, and another nearby looks as if it was once a bastle house.

== Governance ==
Beltingham is in the parliamentary constituency of Hexham.

== Religious sites ==
The church is dedicated to St. Cuthbert and stands in a churchyard containing three massive yew trees, which are more than 700 years old,^{(see below)} and may well have been used for the making of longbows before guns came. Bishop Nicholas Ridley was keen on archery, which was compulsory school sport in the days of Henry VIII. The yew tree indicates an old church, but the present church was built about 1500 in Perpendicular style. There is no division between nave and chancel, and the roof carries a little bell tower. There is an old cross shaft at the west end. In 1883-4 the church was very much restored, and some of the old memorials were destroyed. One, recorded by John Hodgson, requested prayers for the soul of Nicholas Ridley, who died in the fifteenth century (1490). There is a memorial now in the church to the Revd. Anthony Hedley of Chesterholm, friend of Hodgson, who died 17 January 1835, having caught a fatal chill in going out to supervise an excavation at Vindolanda fort. He was born near Otterburn and related to Capability Brown. Both had served the Marquis of Bath at Longleat. Hedley was inspired to improve vicarage gardens as well as to search for antiquities.

Standing halfway between Ridley bridge and Willimoteswick, the little church stands above a burn, making it look like an island, and clustered round the green and the lych-gate are the few houses and the village school. This church, another dedicated to St. Cuthbert, was founded in Saxon days but little of the Saxon building remains. The church we know today was restored at the end of Queen Victoria's reign by Francis Bowes-Lyon, who was an uncle of Queen Elizabeth the Queen Mother. The yew tree in the churchyard would be young when a later Nicholas Ridley died as a martyr, and the forefathers of men who sleep beneath its shade may well have cut their bows from it to draw at the Battle of Flodden. The almost perfect leper's squint is still there, to remind us that in the Dark Ages the outcasts were banned from the house of God.

"Churchyards can be little havens for wildlife, as they are often quiet and undisturbed." Ancient yews offered a sanctuary for the region's wildlife, one of which [in St Cuthbert's churchyard] is believed to be up to 2,000 years old.

== See also ==
- Beltingham River Shingle, a Site of Special Scientific Interest 0.5 miles (0.80 km) north-west of the village.
