= Cottonshope Head Quarry =

Protected area in Northumberland, England

- Site of Special Scientific Interest
- Location within Northumberland
- Location of Cottonshope Head Quarry.
- Area of search: Northumberland
- Grid reference: NT803058
- Coordinates: 55.345831°N 2.3121813°W
- Area: 38.0 acres (0.1538 km^{2}; 0.05938 sq mi)
- Notification date: 1968

Cottonshope Head Quarry is a Site of Special Scientific Interest within Northumberland National Park, Northumberland, England. It is located north of the hamlet of Cottonshopeburnfoot. The site is an abandoned quarry within a military training area.

== Details ==
Cottonshope Head Quarry provides an exceptional exposure of a Lower Carboniferous lava flow. This abandoned quarry contains alkaline olivine basalt flows of Dinantian age. Sandstones underlie the lavas.

This site is probably the southernmost extension of the Scottish Kelso Traps. This site provides evidence of the role of volcanic activity in the development of the Northumberland Basin.

See also: Cottonshope Volcanic Formation.

== Land ownership ==
All of the land in Cottonhope Head Quarry SSSI is owned by the Ministry of Defence. Cottonhope Head Quarry is within the Otterburn Training Area (access is closed when red flags are flying).
