= Muckle Moss =

Nature reserve in Northumberland, England

- Site of Special Scientific Interest
- Location within Northumberland
- Location of Muckle Moss.
- Area of search: Northumberland
- Grid reference: NY799668
- Coordinates: 54.995370°N 2.3157048°W
- Area: 368.2 acres (1.490 km^{2}; 0.5753 sq mi)
- Notification date: 1984

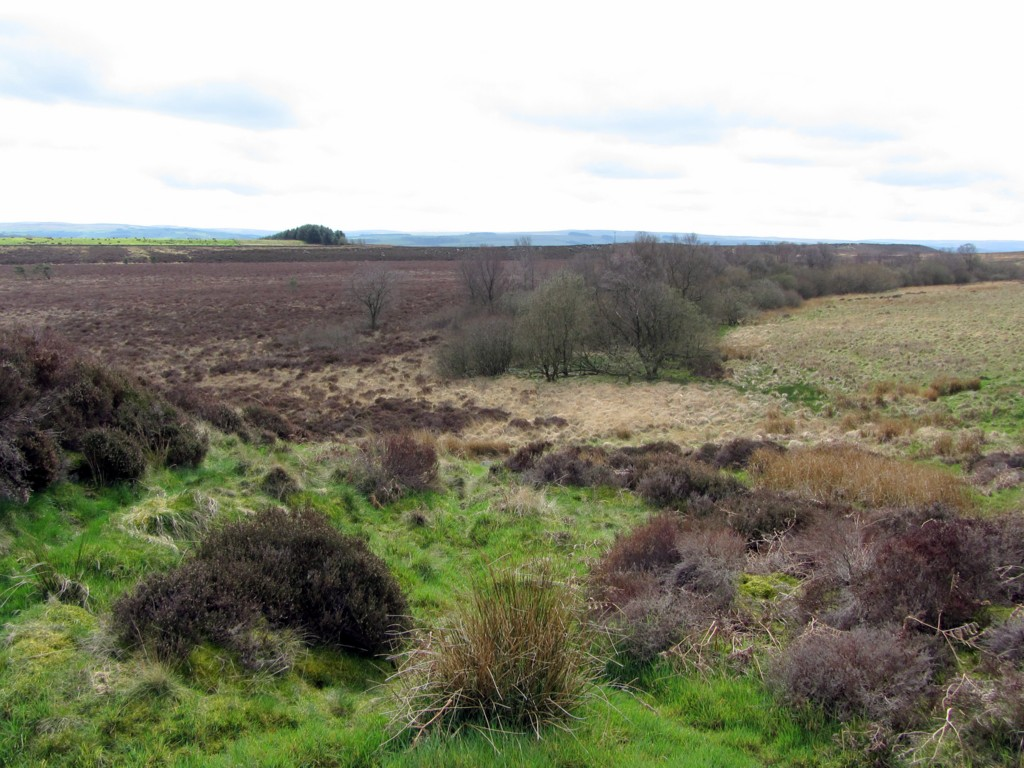
Muckle Moss

Muckle Moss is a Site of Special Scientific Interest (SSSI) and a National Nature Reserve located near Bardon Mill in Northumberland, England. Muckle Moss is a mire over deep peat, and its boundaries include Blackdyke Plantation.

Muckle Moss SSSI was previously notified as part of Roman Wall SSSI.

== Details ==
The central area of the protected area is dominated by the mosses Sphagnum magellanicum, Sphagnum papillosum, Sphagnum recurvum and Sphagnum cuspidatum. Rare moss species recorded here include Sphagum riparium, Sphagnum balticum and Sphagnum dusenii. Heather and cross-leaved heath are present on ridges.

Insect species recorded at this protected area include large heath butterfly and green hairstreek butterfly.

This peatland previously supported a plantation and the peatland was historically modified by draining.

== Land ownership ==
Muckle Moss SSSI is situated within the Crow Hall Farm estate.
