= Beltingham River Shingle =

Site of Special Scientific Interest in Northeast England

- Site of Special Scientific Interest
- Location within Northumberland
- Location of Beltingham River Shingle.
- Area of search: Northumberland
- Grid reference: NY783641
- Coordinates: 54.97179°N 2.33885°W
- Interest: Biological
- Area: 4.7 hectares (12 acres)
- Notification date: 1986
- Location map: DEFRA MAGIC map

Beltingham River Shingle is the name given to a Site of Special Scientific Interest (SSSI) in Northumberland in the north-east of England, notable for an unusual community of flora tolerant to the high levels of naturally occurring heavy metals in the sediment of a section of the River South Tyne.

== Location and natural features ==
Beltingham River Shingle refers to a section of the River South Tyne comprising a coarse-grained shingle island and southern riverbank covering an area of 4.4 hectares (11 acres) situated in the south-west of Northumberland some 0.25 miles (0.40 km) north-west of the village of Beltingham and 0.5 miles (0.80 km) south-east of Bardon Mill. The site lies at 80 metres (260 ft) above sea level on a river which drains a watershed including parts of the Northern Pennine Orefield. High levels of heavy metal have built up in the river sediment forming the site's island and riverbank, and on this thrive a community of metal-tolerant plants able to cope with the sediment's poor water retention characteristic.

== Vegetation ==
The vegetation of the Beltingham River Shingle is a sparse mix of spring sandwort (Minuartia verna), alpine pennycress (Noccaea caerulescens), mountain pansy (Viola lutea), thrift (Armeria maritima), common scurvy grass (Cochlearia officinalis) and sea campion (Silene maritima), with meadow oat-grass (Avenula pratensis), wild thyme (Thymus praecox), biting stonecrop (Sedum acre) and harebell (Campanula rotundifolia). Lichens found at the site include dog lichen (Peltigera canina) and reindeer lichen (Cladonia rangiformis).

A woodland has developed on finer alluvial deposits containing alder (Alnus glutinosa) and willow (Salix spp.) with some birch (Betula sp.), elm (Ulmus glabra) and sycamore (Acer pseudoplatanus) and Scot’s pine (Pinus sylvestris). Wooded areas exhibit ground-cover of dog’s mercury (Mercurialis perennis), wild angelica (Angelica sylvestris), red campion (Silene dioica), hedge woundwort (Stachys sylvatica), moschatel (Adoxa moschatellina) and wood sage (Teucrium scordonia). The river margin is marked by himalayan balsam (Impatiens glandulifera), lesser burdock (Arctium minus) and monkey flower (Mimulus guttatus).

The narrow-lipped helleborine (Epipactis leptochila), more common on the chalk downs of southern England, is found in this and other the metalliferous shingle sites in the county.

The condition of Beltingham River Shingle was judged to be unfavourable-recovering in 2012.

== See also ==
- List of Sites of Special Scientific Interest in Northumberland
