= Colour Heugh and Bowden Doors =

Site of Special Scientific Interest in Northumberland

- Site of Special Scientific Interest
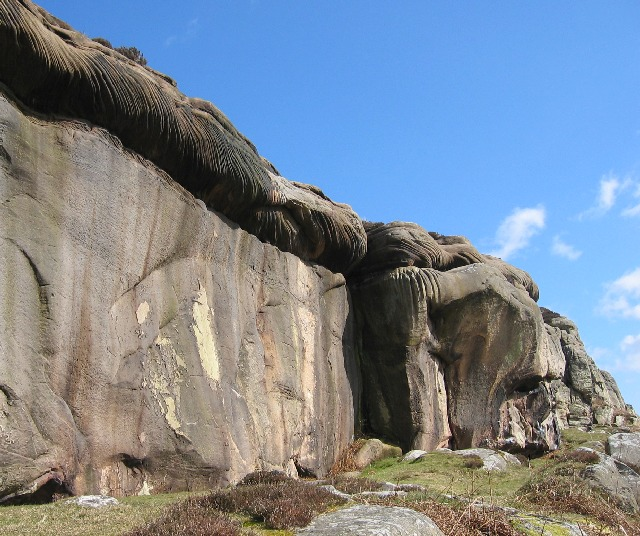
- Crags at Bowden Doors

- Location within Northumberland
- Location of Colour Heugh and Bowden Doors.
- Area of search: Northumberland
- Grid reference: NU068330
- Coordinates: 55.589208°N 1.891222°W
- Interest: Geological
- Area: 11.3 hectares (28 acres)
- Notification date: 1987
- Location map: DEFRA MAGIC map

Colour Heugh and Bowden Doors are two crag rock formations in north Northumberland in North East England, designated as a Site of Special Scientific Interest (SSSI). The 11.3 hectares (28 acres) site is described as "arguably the most impressive exposures of the early-mid Dinantian Fell Sandstone Group in the whole of northern England".

== Location and natural features ==
Colour Heugh and Bowden Doors are two crags situated 2.9 miles (4.7 km) north-north-east of Chatton and 2.6 miles (4.2 km) west of Belford in Northumberland. Bowden Doors comprises 0.6 miles (0.97 km) of west-south-west facing crags of 7–15 metres height; Colour Heugh, some 0.22 miles (0.35 km) north of Bowden Doors, is a similarly orientated 0.2 miles (0.32 km) crag. Both crags expose sandstone of the Dinantian Fell Sandstone Group, enabling its alluvial sedimentary strata to be seen, and preserving the shapes of meandering river-beds.

The condition of Colour Heugh and Bowden Doors was judged to be favourable in 2009.

Bowden Doors is a well-known rock-climbing crag, with several hundred routes mapped.

== See also ==
- List of Sites of Special Scientific Interest in Northumberland
