= Holystone Burn Woods =

Protected area in Northumberland, England

- Site of Special Scientific Interest
- Location within Northumberland
- Location of Holystone Burn Woods.
- Area of search: Northumberland
- Grid reference: NT944020
- Coordinates: 55.312052°N 2.0897735°W
- Area: 273.5 acres (1.107 km^{2}; 0.4273 sq mi)
- Notification date: 1985

Holystone Burn Woods is a Site of Special Scientific Interest (SSSI) within Northumberland National Park in Northumberland, England. It is located near the village of Holystone. The protected area includes part of the valley along which flows the stream called Holystone Burn. Part of the protected area is managed by the Northumberland Wildlife Trust.

== Details ==
Holystone Burn Woods is a woodland that has grown from an ancient coppice. Tree species include sessile oak and pedunculate oak. On dry ridges, silver birch is present. Rowan and sallow is also present. Dry ridges also have heather, bell-heather, crowberry and petty whin. The eastern section of the woodland is dominated by juniper.

A section of mire habitat contains the insectivorous herb called butterwort.

Moss species include Leucobryum glaucum and Polytrichum commune.

Lichen species include Alectoria fuscecens, Usnea subfloridana, Mycoblastus sanguineus and Thelotrema lepadinum.

The juniper pug moth has been seen in large numbers. In total, 186 species of moths and butterflies have been recorded on this site.

== Land ownership ==
Most of the land within Holystone Burn Woods SSSI is owned by the Forestry Commission. A small section near the boundary with the Otterburn Training Area is owned by the Ministry of Defence.
