= Lampert Mosses =

Protected area in Northumberland, England

Lampert mosses
- Site of Special Scientific Interest
- Location within Northumberland
- Location of Lampert mosses.
- Area of search: Northumberland
- Grid reference: NY700755
- Coordinates: 55.073046°N 2.4713586°W
- Area: 2,369.5 acres (9.589 km^{2}; 3.702 sq mi)
- Notification date: 1994

Lampert Mosses is a Site of Special Scientific Interest within Northumberland National Park, Northumberland, England. It is located 8km north of the town of Haltwistle. The western boundary of this protected area largely follows the valley of the River Irthing. The protected area contains exceptional blanket bog over deep peat.

== Details ==
Lampert mosses includes blanket bog on hill tops (known as watershed mires) as well as blanket bog in valley bottoms (saddle mire) and blanket bog on valley sides.

Moss species include Sphagnum papillosum, Sphagnum capillifolium, Sphagnum magellanicum and Sphagnum tenellum. The plants cross leaved heath, cranberry, bog asphodel, round-leaved sundew and bog rosemary are present.

This protected area is also important because of the insect species recorded there. Rare fly species include Spilogona depressiuscula and Coenosia paludis. Rare beetle species include Agonum ericeti and Carabus nitens.

== Peat Restoration ==
Lampert mosses is one of the sites where the IUCN UK Peatland Programme has undertaken restoration and research.
