= Whitfield Moor, Plenmeller and Asholme Commons =

Protected area in Northumberland, England

Whitfield moor, Plenmeller and Asholme Commons
- Site of Special Scientific Interest
- Location within Northumberland
- Location of Whitfield moor, Plenmeller and Asholme Commons.
- Area of search: Northumberland
- Grid reference: NY685520
- Coordinates: 54.861785°N 2.4922584°W
- Area: 17,512.67 acres (70.87 km^{2}; 27.36 sq mi)
- Notification date: 1997

Whitfield Moor, Plenmeller and Asholme Commons is a Site of Special Scientific Interest in the North Pennines in Northumberland, England. This protected area is located south of Haltwistle and includes part of the Bellister Castle estate (now owned by the National Trust) and parts of the Williamston estate and Whitfield estate.

== Details ==
Whitfield Moor and Plenmeller Common are some of the most extensive areas of blanket bog and dry heath in northern England. The protected area is exceptional because of its moorland breeding birds.

Bird species recorded in this protected area include merlin, golden plover, lapwing, curlew, snipe, red grouse, short-eared owl and hen harrier.

Moss species in this protected area include Sphagnum cuspidatum, Sphagnum recurvum and Sphagnum auriculatum.

Some habitats in this protected area are associated with past lead mining and the spoil heaps it has produced. The metal tolerant plant called spring sandwort has been recorded in this protected area.

The southern boundary of this protected area is near Slaggyford where Northumberland Wildlife Trust have a nature reserve called Williamston that is outside the boundaries of Whitfield Moor, Plenmeller and Asholme Commons SSSI.
