= Bradford Kames =

Esker in Northumberland, England

- Site of Special Scientific Interest
- Location within Northumberland
- Location of Bradford Kames.
- Area of search: Northumberland
- Grid reference: NU162320
- Coordinates: 55.582893°N 1.743836°W
- Interest: Geological
- Area: 139.4 hectares (340 acres)
- Notification date: 1969
- Location map: DEFRA MAGIC map

Bradford Kames is the name given to a Site of Special Scientific Interest (SSSI) in north Northumberland, England. The site is an esker, a ridge of glacial till deposited in the Pleistocene epoch.

== Location and natural features ==
Bradford Kames is situated in the north-east of England in the county of Northumberland, some 3.5 miles (5.6 km) west of the coastal town of Seahouses. The esker is composed of a ridge and associated mounds, on a site of circa 1.75 miles (2.82 km) length orientated in a north-north-west - south-south-east direction, with the ground falling to the east. The SSSI citation for Bradford Kames describes it as providing "a striking example of the complex landform and sediment associations that developed during the wastage of the last ice sheet."

At the north end of the site, Spindlestones Pond provides a habitat for great crested newts.

The condition of Bradford Kames was judged to be favourable in 2011.

== See also ==
- List of Sites of Special Scientific Interest in Northumberland
