= Holystone North Wood =

Woodland in Northumberland, England

- Site of Special Scientific Interest
- Location within Northumberland
- Location of Holystone North Wood.
- Area of search: Northumberland
- Grid reference: NT945028
- Coordinates: 55.319241°N 2.0882140°W
- Area: 36.5 acres (0.1477 km^{2}; 0.05703 sq mi)
- Notification date: 1984

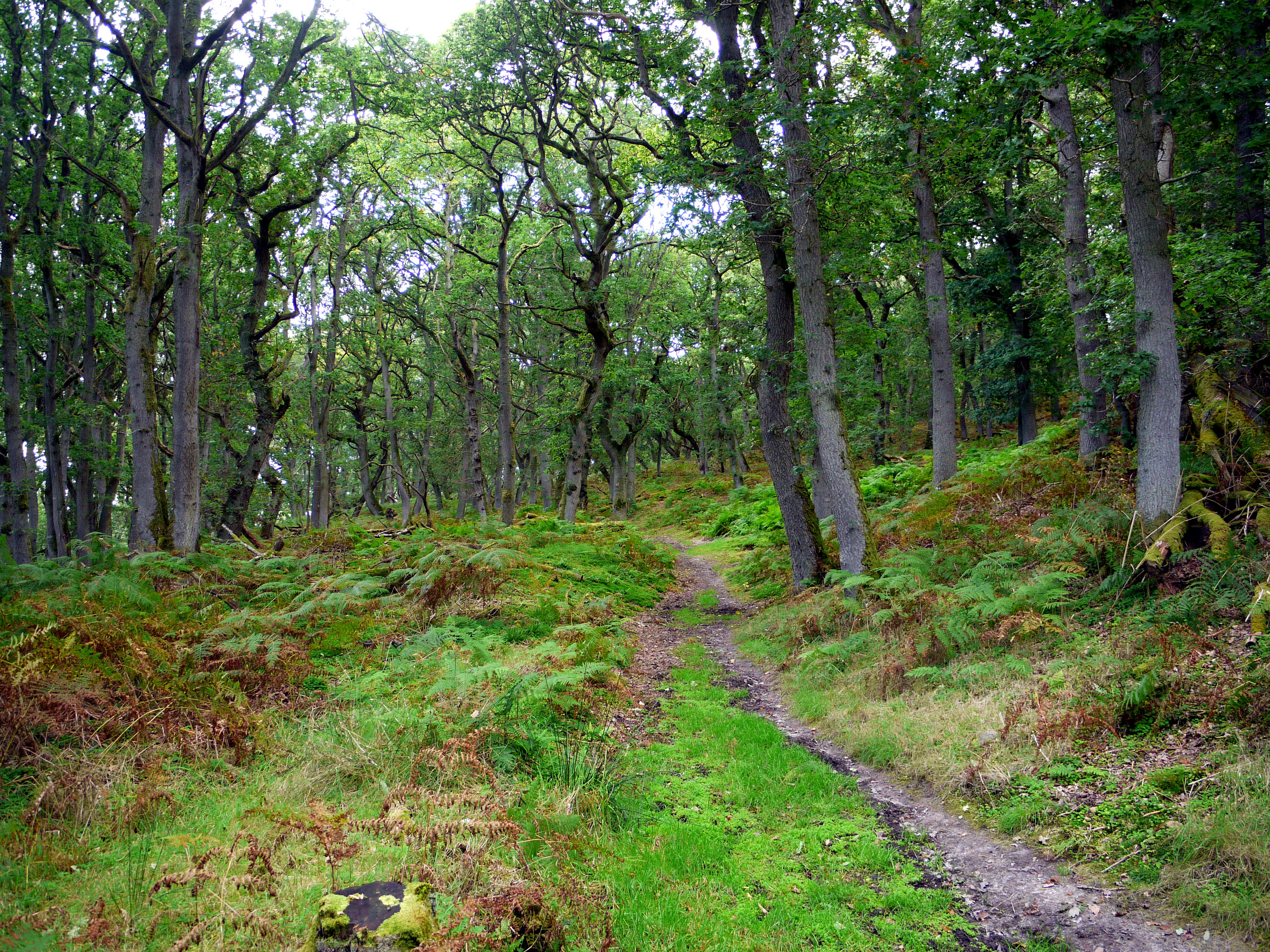
Holystone North Wood

Holystone North Wood is a Site of Special Scientific Interest (SSSI) in Northumberland National Park, Northumberland, England. It is located near the village of Holystone. The woodland was historically an oak coppice.

== Details ==
The woodland is dominated by sessile oak. Some of these trees are more than 100 years old. The spring flowering perennial herb called wood anemone is also found in this protected area. Within a wet patch of this protected area, the plant lesser twayblade has been recorded. The moss Leucobryum glaucum is widespread here. In 1999, a survey of bat diversity found four species: pipestrelle bat, daubentons bat, natterers bat and whiskered bat.

This woodland has been continuously wooded since at least 1700.

== Land ownership and management ==
All of the land within Holystone North Wood SSSI is owned by the Forestry Commission. The site is managed by the Northumberland Wildlife Trust.
