= Hareshaw Dene =

Protected area in Northumberland, England

Coordinates: 55°09′24″N 2°14′59″W

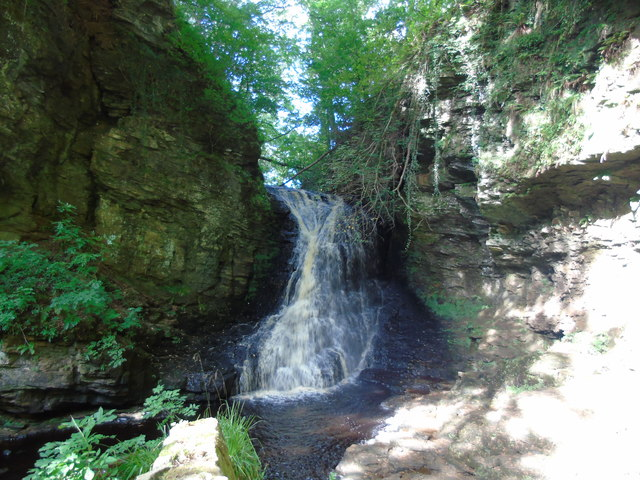
Hareshaw Linn waterfall within Hareshaw Dene SSSI

Hareshaw Dene is a woodland and a 20 ha (0.08 sq mi) Site of Special Scientific Interest (SSSI) on the southeastern boundary of Northumberland National Park in Northumberland, England. It is located 1 km north of the village of Bellingham. This woodland is protected because of the diversity of plant and lichen species present.

This woodland is on the sides of the valley of a stream called Hareshaw Burn. There is a waterfall in this protected area, called Hareshaw Linn.

In the 19th century Hareshaw Burn was used as a water source supplying ironworks where there were coke ovens and blast furnaces.

== Biology ==
Tree species in this woodland include elm, ash, hazel (coppiced) and rowan. Herbaceous plant species include wood sage, dog's mercury, wild raspberry and opposite-leaved golden saxifrage. On upper slopes, tree species include pedunculate oak and shrub species include heather and bilberry. Lichen species include Thelotrema lepadinum. Fern species include Polypodium vulgare.

Daubenton's bat is found in this woodland.

== Geology ==
Hareshaw Dene is a river gorge cut through sandstone rocks from the Carboniferous period.

== Land ownership ==
All land within Hareshaw Dene SSSI is owned by the local authority. The woodland is owned by Northumberland County Council.
