= Harbottle Moors =

Protected area in Northumberland, England

- Site of Special Scientific Interest
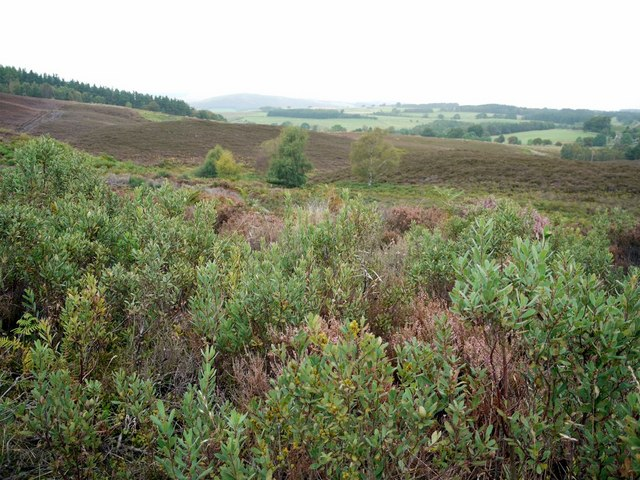
- Bog myrtle scrub, Harbottle Moors

- Location within Northumberland
- Location of Harbottle Moors.
- Area of search: Northumberland
- Grid reference: NT900040
- Coordinates: 55.329952°N 2.1591662°W
- Area: 2,275 acres (9.207 km^{2}; 3.555 sq mi)
- Notification date: 1986

Harbottle Moors is a Site of Special Scientific Interest (SSSI) within Northumberland National Park, in Northumberland, England. It is located near the village of Alwinton. The River Coquet forms the northern border of this protected area.

The area is protected because of its blanket bog over peat and also because of its dry heath. Notable plant species include sundew, bog-orchid, sweet gale and lesser skullcap.

The protected area includes two lakes and birds including teal, little grebe and black-headed gulls have been recorded here. Black grouse, ring ouzel and whinchat have been recorded in moorland habitat within this protected area.

Most of the land area designated as Harbottle Moors SSSI is owned by the Ministry of Defence (part of it falls within Otterburn Training Area). The southwestern section around Drake Stone is owned by the Forestry Commission. In this southwestern region, Northumberland Wildlife Trust manage the area around Harbottle Crags.
