= Greenleighton Quarry =

Protected area in Northumberland, England

- Site of Special Scientific Interest
- Location within Northumberland
- Location of Greenleighton Quarry.
- Area of search: Northumberland
- Grid reference: NZ034920
- Coordinates: 55.222216°N 1.9480976°W
- Area: 31.58 acres (0.1278 km^{2}; 0.04934 sq mi)
- Notification date: 1984

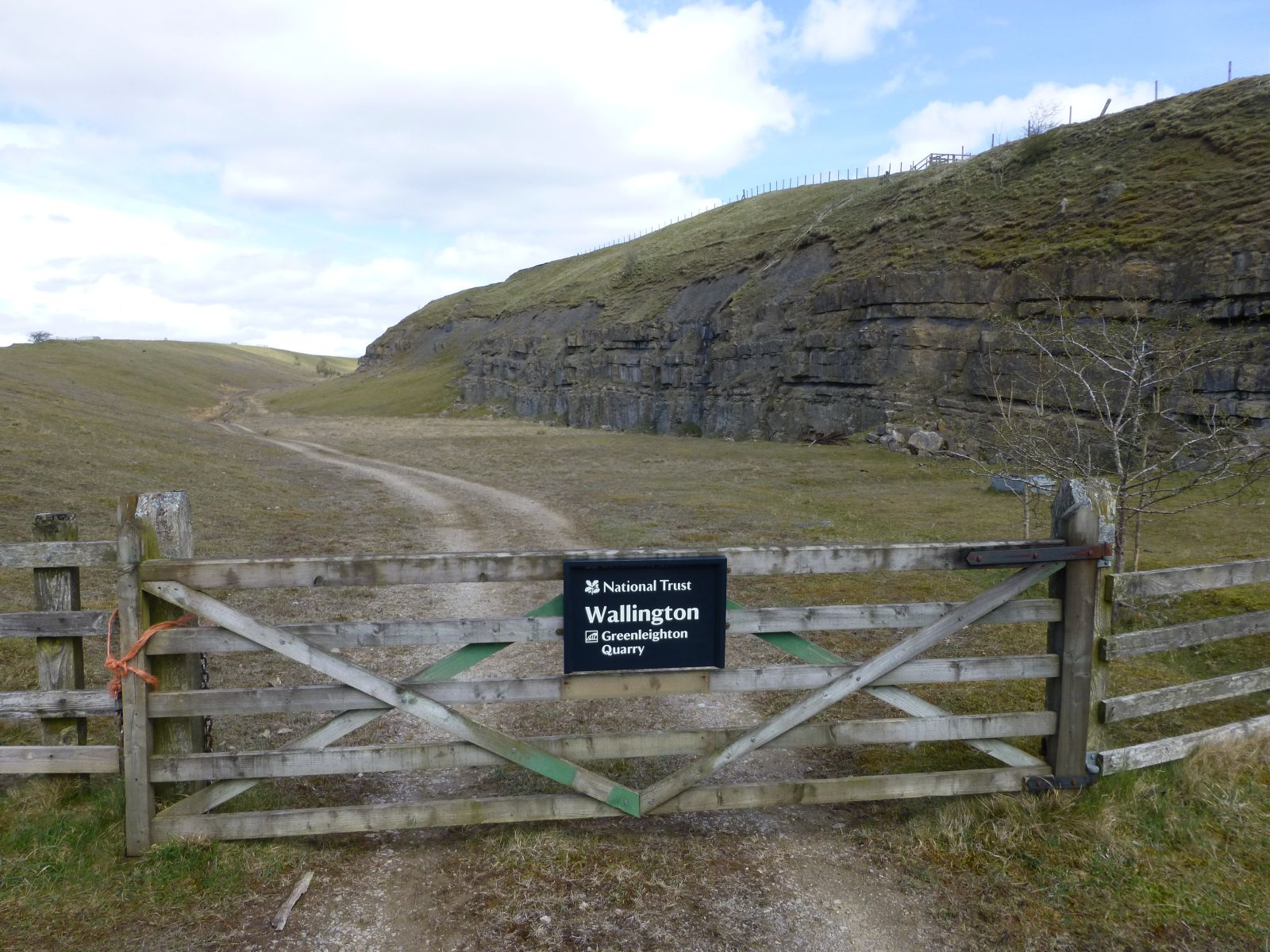
Greenleighton Quarry

Greenleighton Quarry is a Site of Special Scientific Interest (SSSI) in Northumberland, England. It is located near the village of Rothley. This protected area is renowned for its Brachiopod fossils and is owned by the National Trust.

The protected area comprises the older of two quarries (excavation occurred in eighteenth and nineteenth centuries). There is a nearby newer quarry outside the protected area that was excavated as recently as 1982.

== Details ==
The strata exposed in Greenleighton Quarry includes sections of the Great Limestone and overlying sediments of the Namurian age, from around 330 million years old.

Fossils from the Brachiopod genus Pleuropugnoides and the Mollusc genus Cravenoceras have been identified from this protected area.

This protected area is a popular starting point for walking hikes.
