= Longhorsley Moor =

Protected area in Northumberland, England

Coordinates: 55.229157°N 1.7484195°W

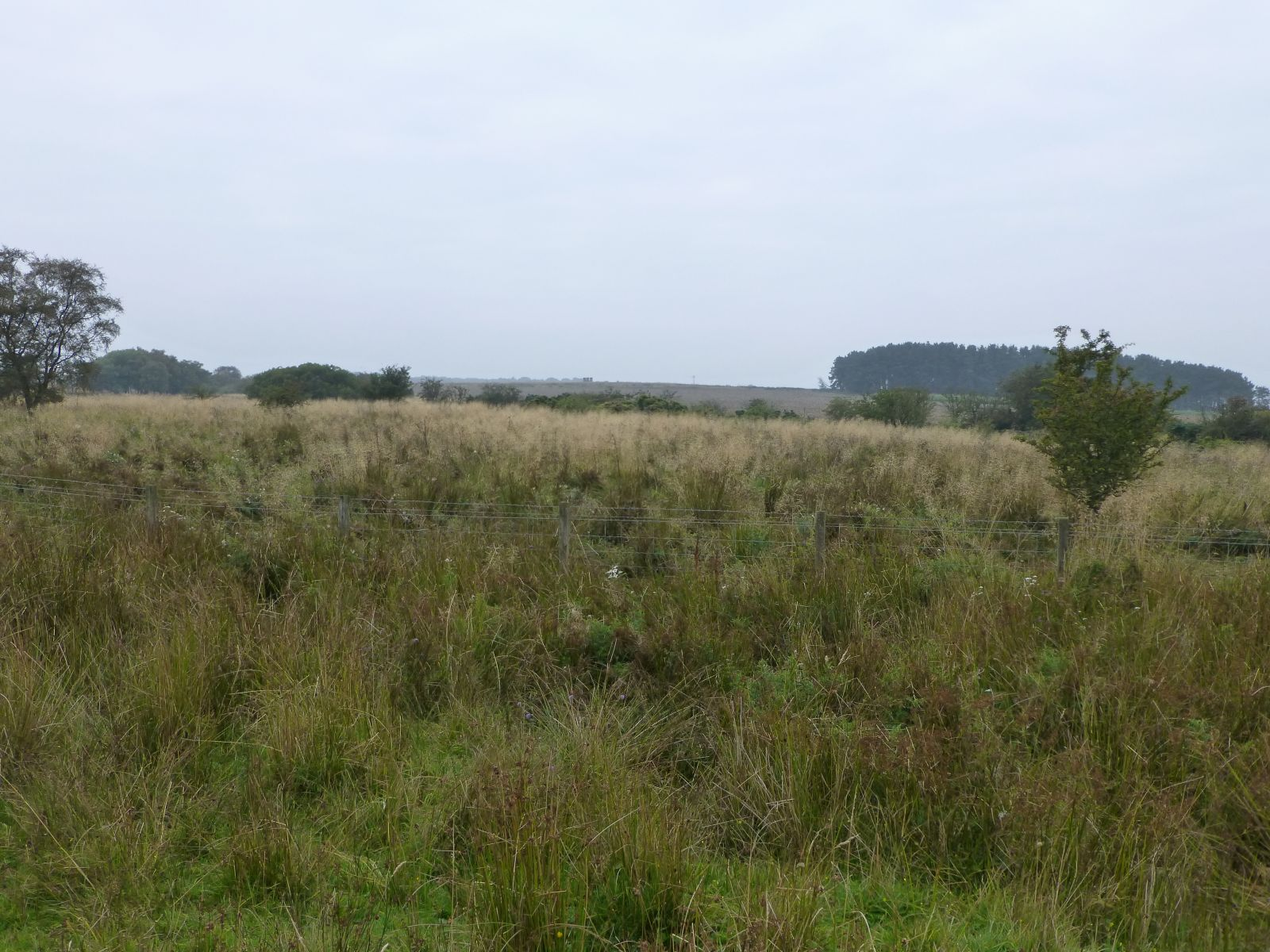
Longhorsley Moor

Longhorsley Moor is a Site of Special Scientific Interest (SSSI) in Northumberland, England. It is located 7km north of the town of Morpeth. Longhorsley Moor, near the village of Longhorsley, is a protected area because of the lowland heath habitat present.

== Biology ==
The dry heath is dominated by heather, creeping willow, bell heather and bilberry. Herbaceous plants also include wood sage, wood sorrel, crosswort, herb robert and water avens.

Insects recorded in this protected area include small heath, meadow brown and small copper. Bird species recorded in this protected area include whinchat, linnet, yellowhammer, willow warbler, grasshopper warbler, and reed bunting.

== Geology ==
The underlying substrates are sandstone and boulder clay.

== Land ownership and management ==
All land within Longhorsley Moor SSSI is owned by the local authority. Grazing management has been achieved by collaboration between Northumberland Wildlife Trust, Longhorsley Parish Council, Moorland Mousie Trust and Flexigraze Community Interest Company. Longhorsley Parish Council safeguards and promotes the Moor.
