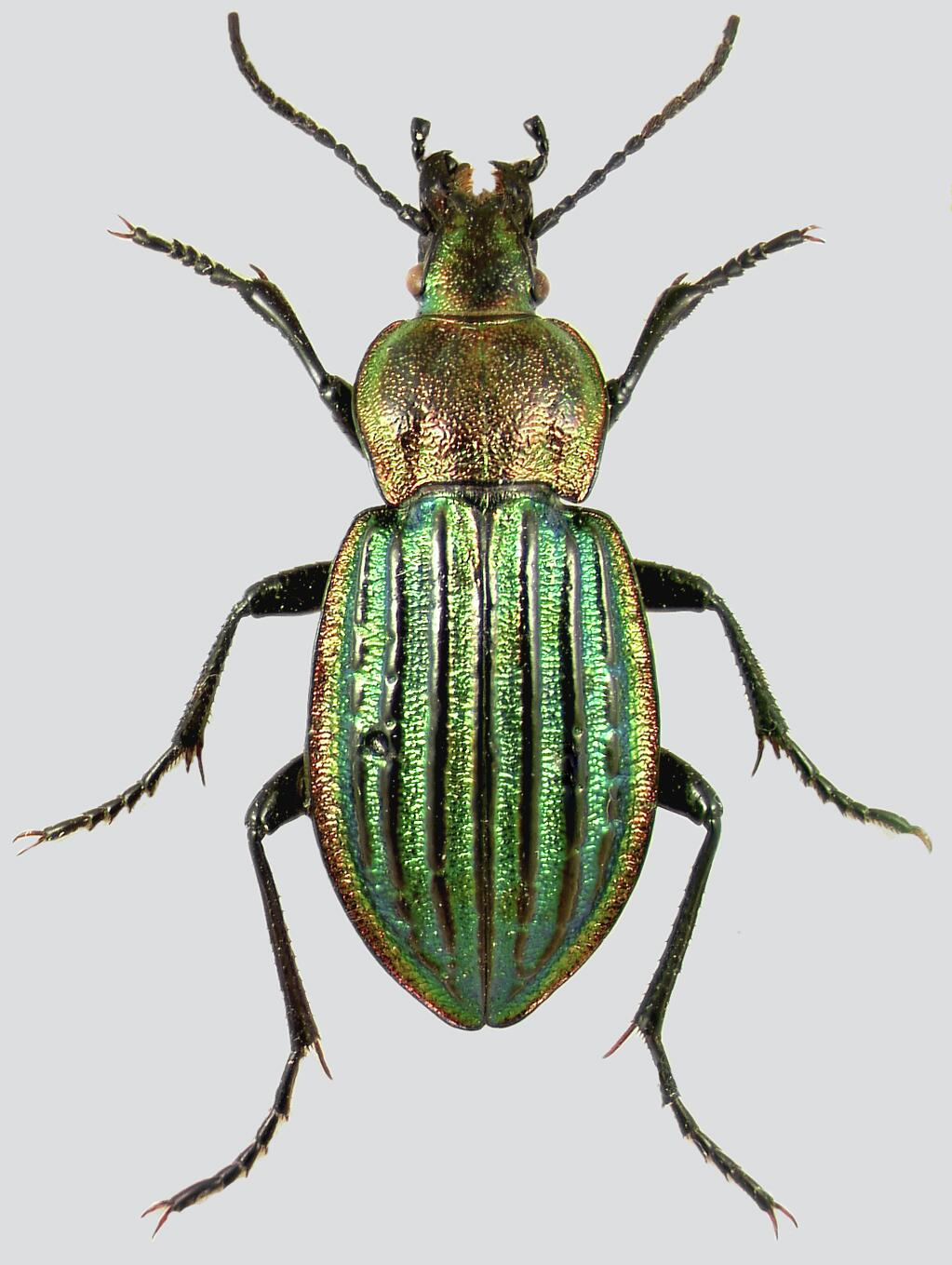

Scientific classification
- Kingdom: Animalia
- Phylum: Arthropoda
- Clade: Pancrustacea
- Class: Insecta
- Order: Coleoptera
- Suborder: Adephaga
- Family: Carabidae
- Genus: Carabus
- Species: C. nitens

Binomial name
- Carabus nitens Linnaeus, 1758

Synonyms
- Hemicarabus nitens (Linnaeus, 1758)

= Carabus nitens =

Species of beetle

Carabus nitens is a species of ground beetle native to the Palearctic. In Europe, it is observed in Austria, the Baltic states, Benelux, the Czech Republic, France, Germany, Great Britain including the Isle of Man, Republic of Ireland, Kaliningrad, Northern Ireland, Poland, Romania, Scandinavia, Slovakia, and Eastern Europe.
