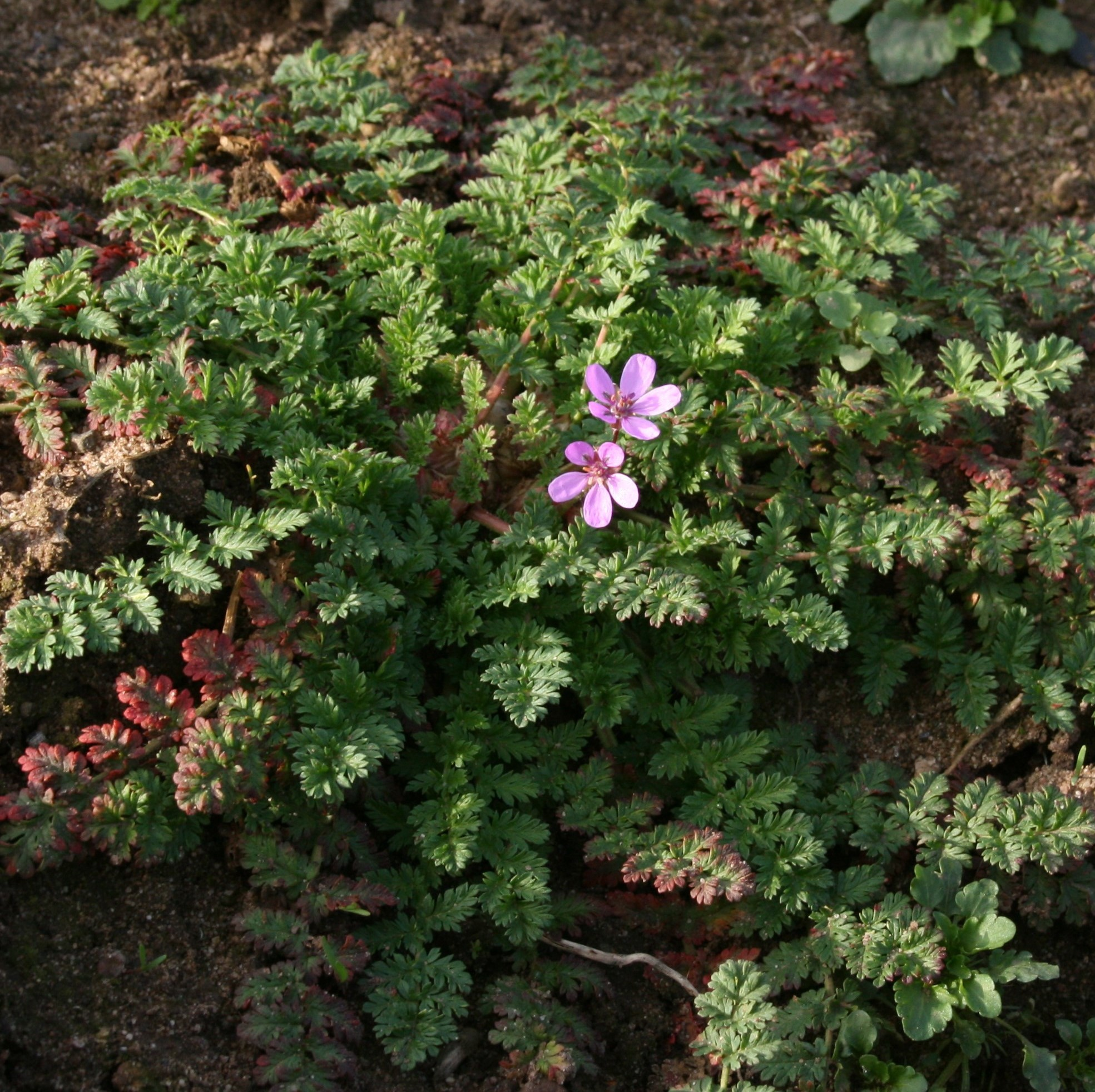

Scientific classification
- Kingdom: Plantae
- Clade: Embryophytes
- Clade: Tracheophytes
- Clade: Spermatophytes
- Clade: Angiosperms
- Clade: Eudicots
- Clade: Rosids
- Order: Geraniales
- Family: Geraniaceae
- Genus: Erodium
- Species: E. cicutarium

Binomial name
- Erodium cicutarium (L.) L'Hér., 1789

Synonyms
- Geranium cicutarium L. (1753)

= Erodium cicutarium =

Common stork's-bill

Plant species in the geranium family

Erodium cicutarium, also known as common stork's-bill, redstem filaree, redstem stork's bill or pinweed, is a herbaceous annual – or in warm climates, biennial – member of the family Geraniaceae of flowering plants. It is native to Macaronesia, temperate Eurasia and north and northeast Africa, and was introduced to North America in the eighteenth century, where it has since become naturalized, particularly in the deserts and arid grasslands of the southwestern United States. It is also naturalized elsewhere, including South America and southern Africa.

== Description ==
Common stork's-bill is a herb that typically grows in rosettes pressed flat to the ground, with a deep tap root that allows it to survive through the summer on dry soils. It can develop stems up to 60 cm long that are sometimes red and sometimes green, and may be erect or prostrate, and have simple or glandular hairs which become more abundant towards the top. Plants with glandular hairs are sticky, but those with simple hairs are much less so. It has no scent.

The leaves are arranged in a basal rosette at the beginning of the year, later occurring in opposite pairs along the stem. They are pinnate, almost twice-pinnate as each leaflet is deeply toothed or divided more than halfway to the midrib, and the whole leaf can vary in size from 2–20 cm long, either with a petiole or not. Like the stems, the leaves can be covered with glandular or simple hairs.

The stems bear bright pink flowers which often have dark spots on the bases. The flowers are arranged in a loose cluster and have ten filaments – five of which are fertile – and five styles. The leaves are pinnate to pinnate-pinnatifid, with hairy stems. The long seed-pod, shaped like the bill of a stork, bursts open in a spiral when ripe, sending the seeds (which have long tails called awns) into the air.

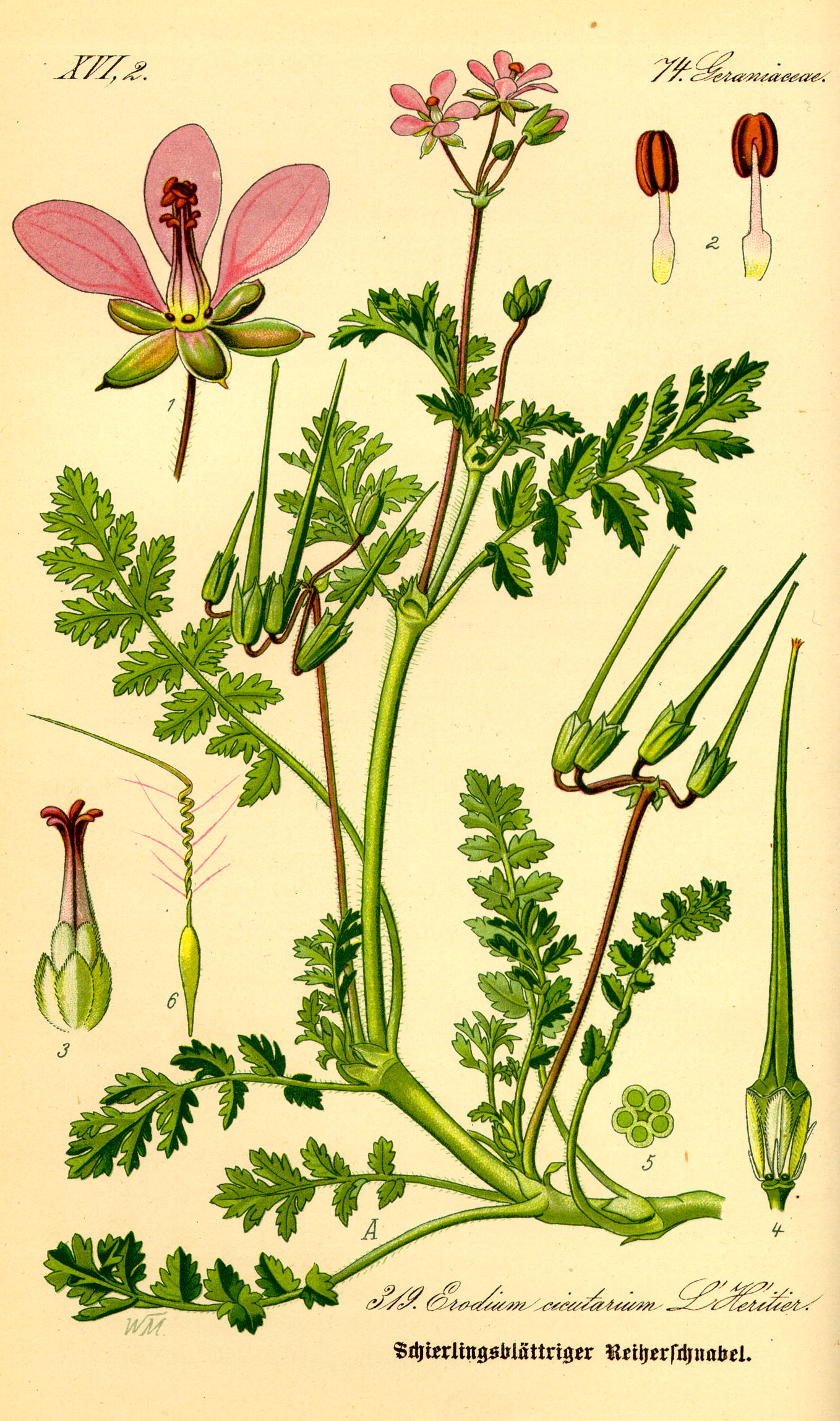
A botanical illustration

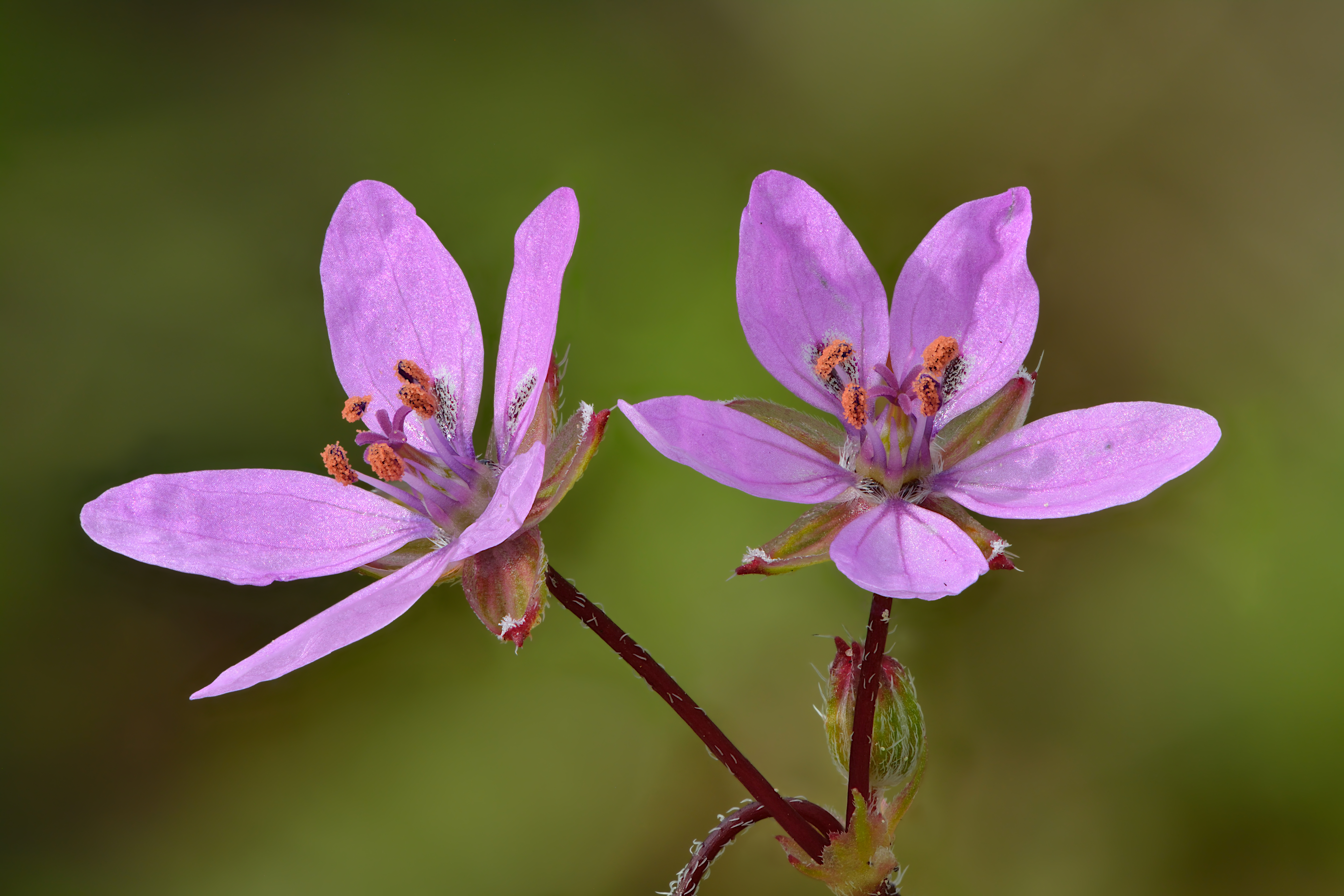
Close-up of the flowers

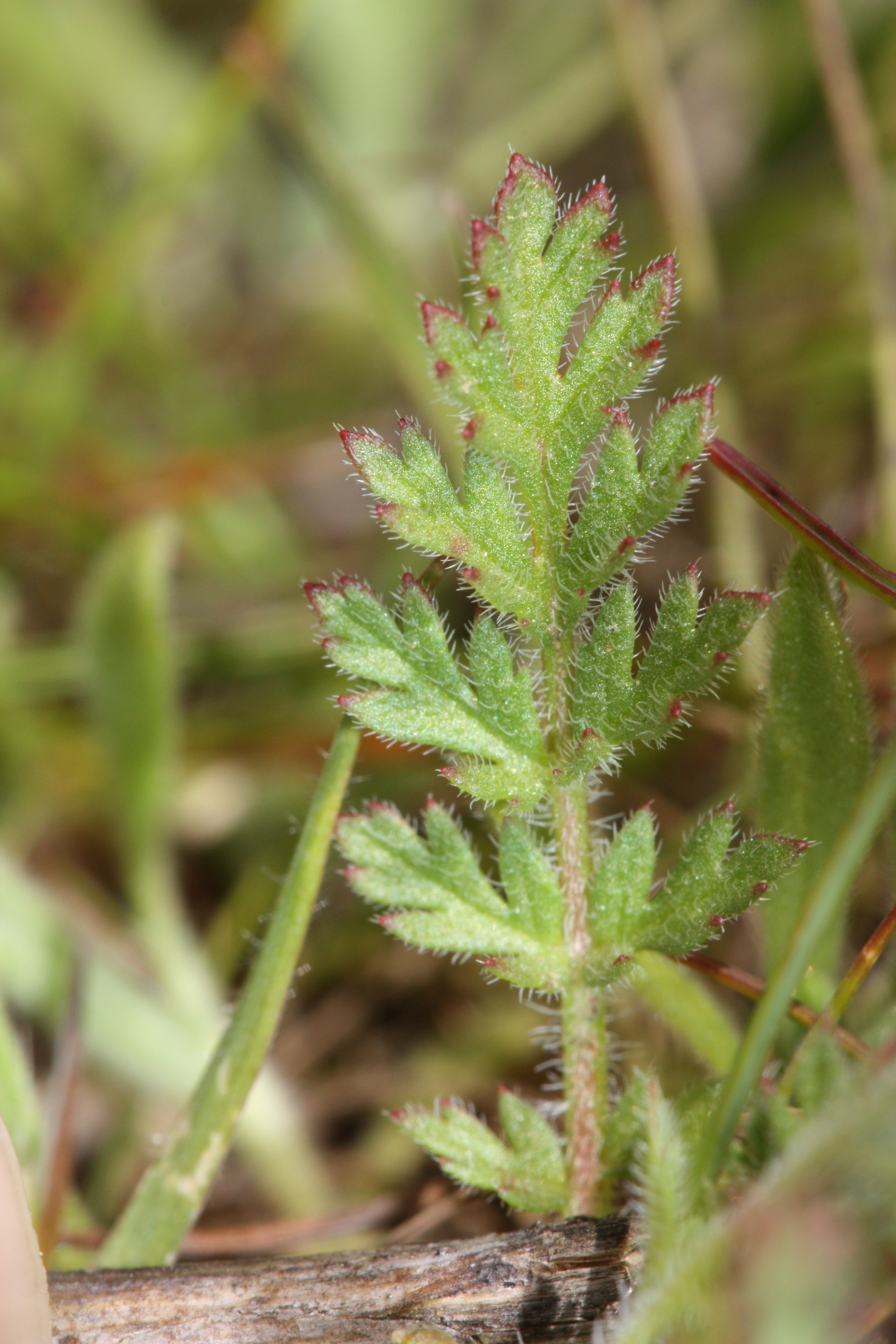
Typical leaf shape

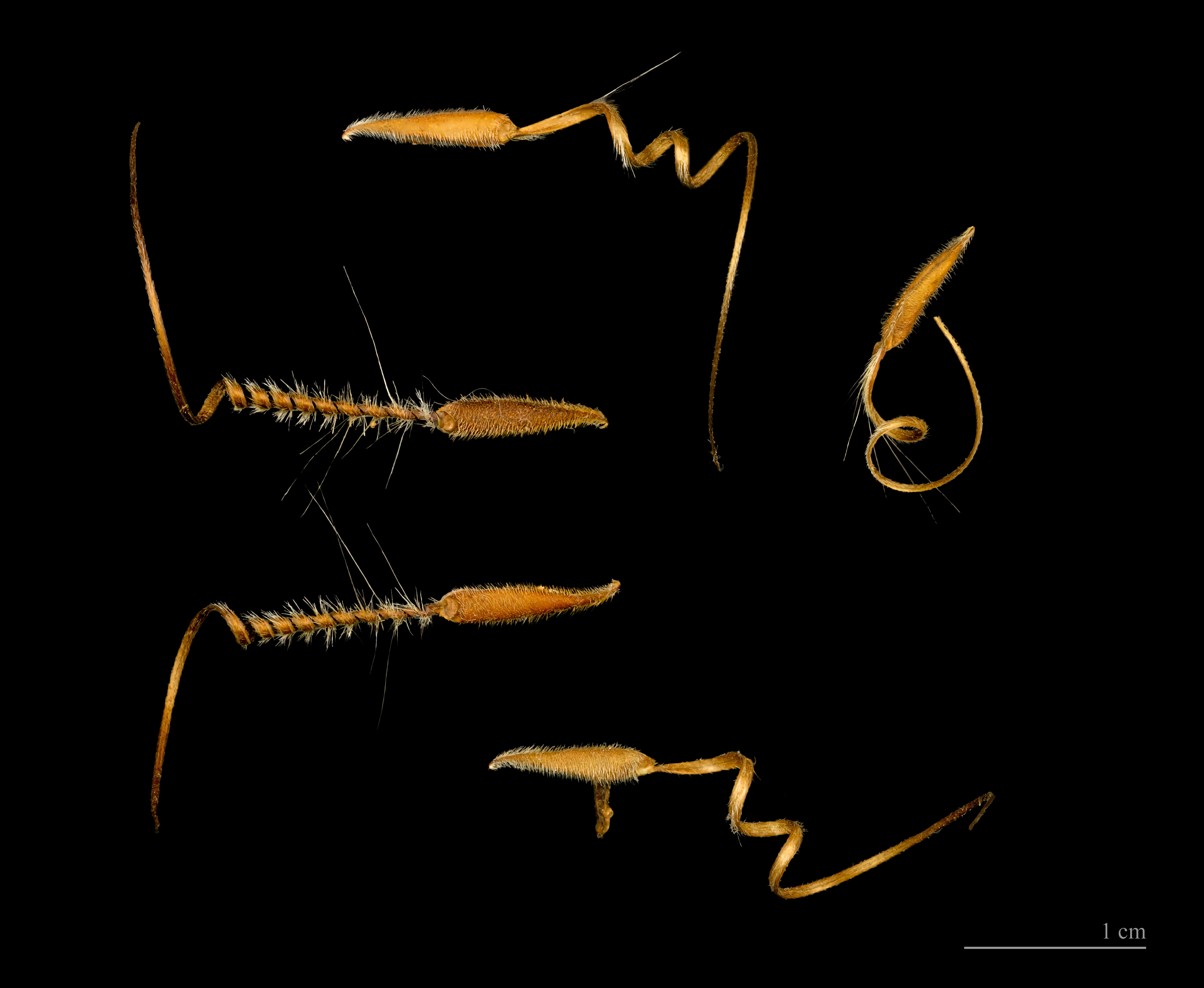
achenes with awns

=== Seed dispersal behavior ===
Erodium cicutarium seed uses self-dispersal mechanisms to spread away from the maternal plant and also reach a good germination site to increase fitness. Two abilities that E. cicutarium has are explosive dispersal (ballochory), which launches seeds by storing elastic energy, and self-burial dispersal, where the seeds move themselves across the soil using hygroscopically powered shape change.

==== Explosive dispersal ====
After flowering, the five pericarps on the fruits of E. cicutarium, and the awns, which are appendages of the pericarps, join and grow into a spine shape. As the fruits dry, dehydration creates tension, and elastic energy develops within the awns. With sufficient elastic energy the shape of the awns changes from straight to helical, causing them to burst away from the maternal plants, bringing the seeds with them. During dispersal, mechanical energy stored in specialized tissues is transferred to the seeds to increase their kinetic and potential energy. The energy storage capacity of the seeds is determined by the level of hydration, suggesting a role of turgor pressure in the explosive dispersal mechanism.

==== Self-burial dispersal ====
The awn of each seed, once on the ground, responds to the humidity of the environment and changes its shape accordingly. The awn coils under dehydration and uncoils when wet. This results in motor action of the seed, which, combined with the hairs on the seed and along the length of the awns, moves the seed across the surface, eventually positioning it into a crevice and creating a drilling action that forces the seed into the ground. The coiling and uncoiling of the awns is achieved by the hygroscopic tissue in the active layer on the awns. Hygroscopic movement happens in response to a change in the water content of dead plant tissue, especially in the cell wall. Water absorbed by the cell wall binds to the matrix of the awns, causing it to expand and to drive the cellulose microfibrils apart, which causes the matrix to uncoil, thus straightening the awns. Inversely, the matrix will contract under dehydration, leading to the coil of the awns.

Erodium cicutarium seed uncoiling as it absorbs moisture (real-time)

Erodium cicutarium seed drills itself into the soil (time-lapse)

Research found no correlation between weight of the awned fruits and the dispersal distance. E. cicutarium with larger seeds have a longer coil and uncoil time compare to smaller seeds. In the field, the rate of seed burial declined throughout the season. The larger seeds buried themselves more often than the smaller seeds. However, larger seeds have a harder time finding a large enough space for the seeds to be buried. Conversely, smaller seeds have an easier time finding a hole and drilling themselves in, and thus are more likely to be buried.

==== Advantages ====
The advantages of explosive dispersal and self-burial dispersal are getting mature seeds of E.cicutarium quickly to the ground during the most favorable period for burial, thus increasing fitness.

== Distribution and ecology ==
Erodium cicutarium has a very extensive native range. It includes all of Europe with the exception of Iceland. In Africa its native range extends across the north from Morocco to Egypt and also in Chad and Eritrea, but not in Sudan. It is also native in most of Asia according to Plants of the World Online with the exceptions of Southeast Asia, central China, and Mongolia. It now grows as an introduced plant in Taiwan, Korea, Japan, and the eastern half of the Russian Far East. Elsewhere it has been introduced to North and South America, southern Africa and Tasmania.

The plant is widespread across North America after being introduced by European colonists. It grows as an annual in the continent's northern half. In the southern areas of North America, the plant tends to grow as a biennial with a more erect habit and with much larger leaves, flowers, and fruits. It flowers from May until August. Common stork's-bill can be found in bare, sandy, grassy places both inland and around the coasts. It is a food plant for the larvae of the brown argus butterfly.

The seeds of this plant are collected by various species of harvester ants.

== Uses ==
The young leaves are edible raw or cooked. The whole plant is reportedly edible with a flavor similar to sharp parsley if picked young. According to John Lovell's Honey Plants of North America (1926), "the pink flowers are a valuable source of honey (nectar), and also furnish much pollen". Among the Zuni people, a poultice of chewed root is applied to sores and rashes and an infusion of the root is taken for stomachache.

=== Nutrition ===
Hairy stork's bill, raw
Nutritional value per 100 g (3.5 oz)
- Energy: 96 kJ (23 kcal)
- Carbohydrates: 7.9 g
- Sugars: 4.3 g
- Dietary fiber: 3.0 g
- Fat: 0.1 g
- Protein: 0.6 g
Vitamins and minerals
Vitamins	Quantity %DV^{†}
Vitamin A equiv.	22% 200 μg
Vitamin C	2% 2.03 mg
Minerals	Quantity %DV^{†}
Calcium	6% 74.3 mg
Iron	12% 2.2 mg
Magnesium	5% 20 mg
Phosphorus	2% 28 mg
Potassium	7% 223.4 mg
Sodium	1% 18.9 mg
Zinc	4% 0.4 mg
- Other constituents: Quantity
- Water: 90.6 g
- ^{†}Percentages estimated using US recommendations for adults, except for potassium, which is estimated based on expert recommendation from the National Academies.

Raw Hairy stork's bill are 90.6% water, 7.9% carbohydrates, 0.6% protein, 3% dietary fiber, 0.8% ash and 0.1% fat.
