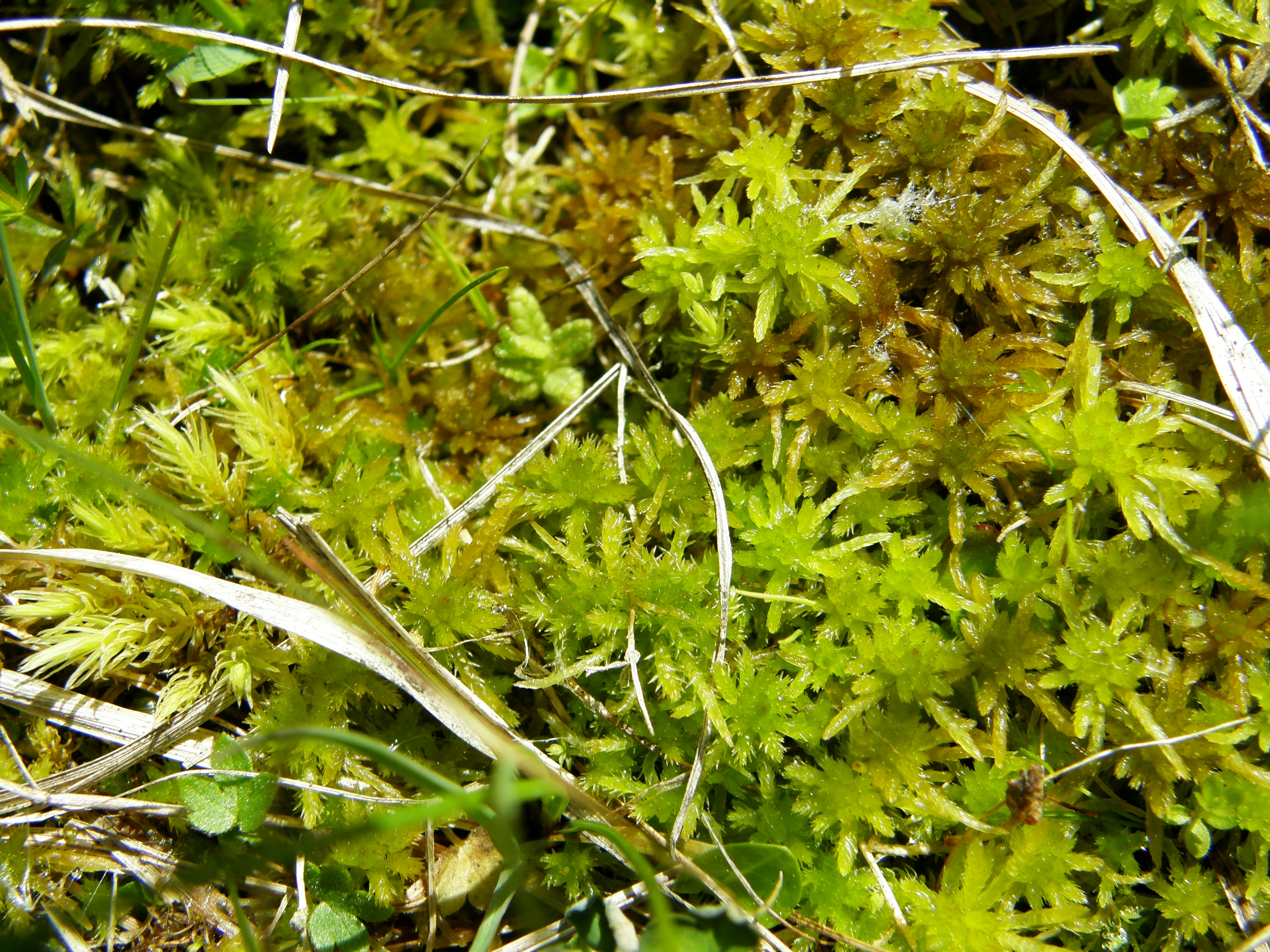
- Sphagnum recurvum

Scientific classification
- Kingdom: Plantae
- Division: Bryophyta
- Class: Sphagnopsida
- Order: Sphagnales
- Family: Sphagnaceae
- Genus: Sphagnum
- Species: S. recurvum

Binomial name
- Sphagnum recurvum P.Beauv.

= Sphagnum recurvum =

Species of moss

Sphagnum recurvum is a species of moss belonging to the family Sphagnaceae.

It is native to Eurasia and America.
