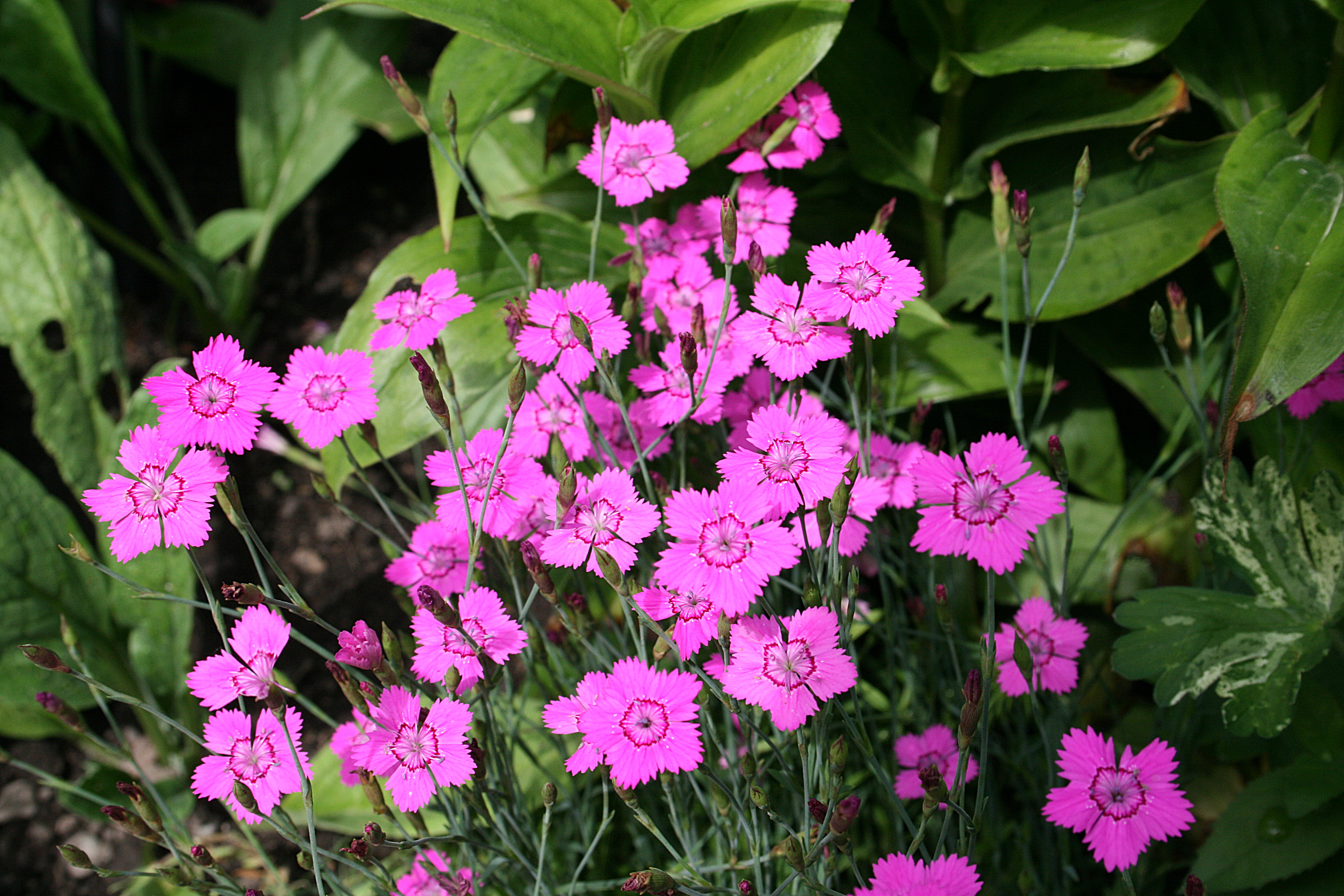

Scientific classification
- Kingdom: Plantae
- Clade: Embryophytes
- Clade: Tracheophytes
- Clade: Angiosperms
- Clade: Eudicots
- Order: Caryophyllales
- Family: Caryophyllaceae
- Genus: Dianthus
- Species: D. deltoides

Binomial name
- Dianthus deltoides L.

= Dianthus deltoides =

Maiden pink

Species of flowering plant

Dianthus deltoides, the maiden pink, is a species of Dianthus native to most of Europe and western Asia. It can also be found in many parts of North America, where it is an introduced species.

It is a herbaceous perennial plant growing to 45 centimeters (18 in) tall. It has very narrow green or glaucous leaves forming a loosely tufted plant. The flowers are 15–20 millimeters across and usually pink, but they may be white and are often spotted white. It has an epicalyx of bracteoles, meaning it has a group of specialised leaves at the base of the flower. The calyx tube itself is not scarious (papery and membranous) at the joints between the lobes.

It is a plant of often calcareous (chalky) grassland but may also be found on rocky ground and occasionally on old mine spoil. It has been observed to hybridise with introduced Dianthus barbatus, when native.

== Cultivation and uses ==
It is widely used in horticulture with many cultivars such as 'Zing Rose', sold as garden ornamental plants with flowers in a range of pink colours and sometimes darker green foliage. In the UK it has gained the Royal Horticultural Society's Award of Garden Merit.
