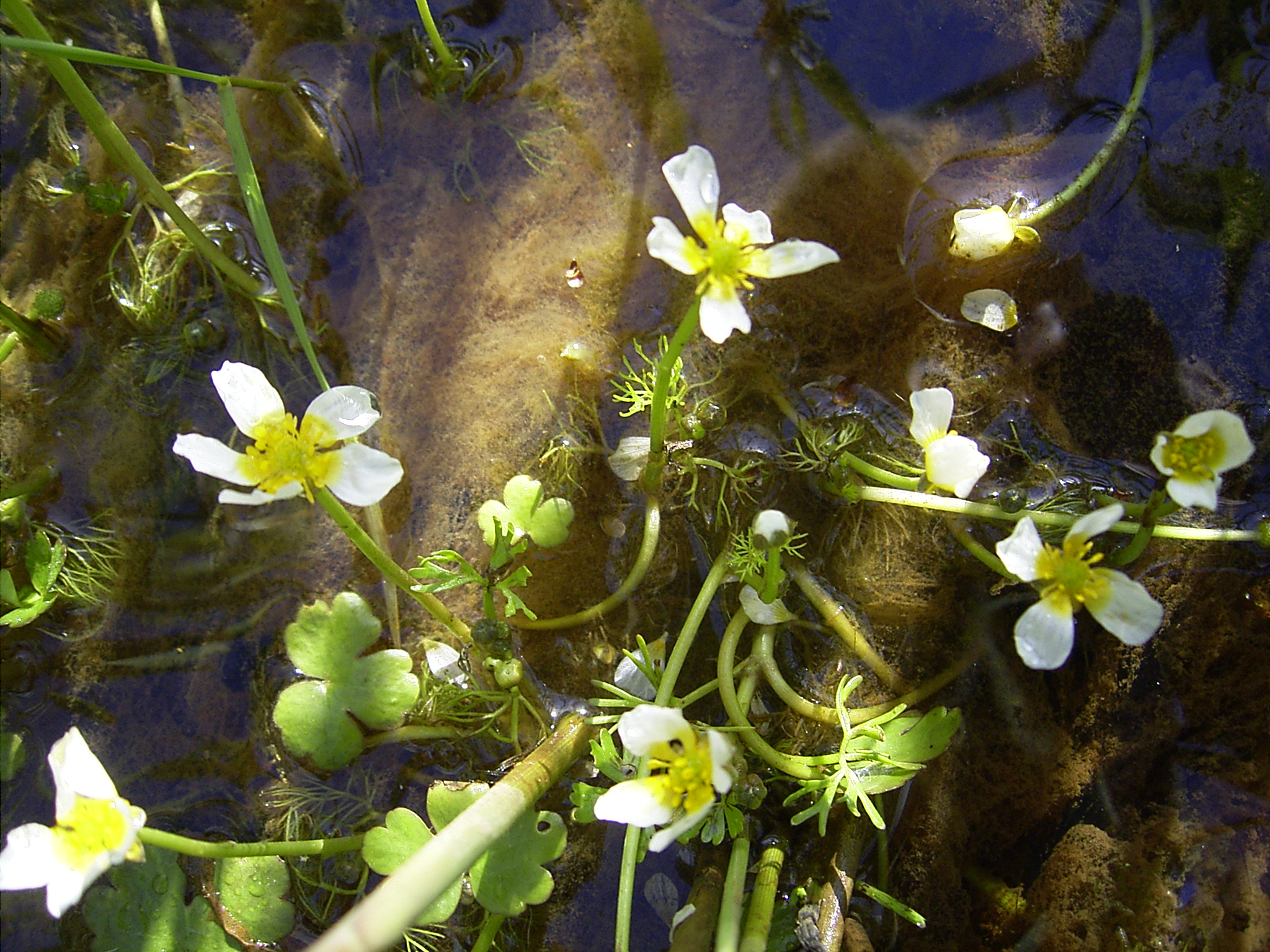

Conservation status
- Least Concern (IUCN 3.1)

Scientific classification
- Kingdom: Plantae
- Clade: Tracheophytes
- Clade: Angiosperms
- Clade: Eudicots
- Order: Ranunculales
- Family: Ranunculaceae
- Genus: Ranunculus
- Species: R. aquatilis

Binomial name
- Ranunculus aquatilis L.

= Ranunculus aquatilis =

Species of aquatic plant

Ranunculus aquatilis, the common water-crowfoot or white water-crowfoot, is a plant species of the genus Ranunculus, native throughout most of Europe and western North America, and also northwest Africa.

This is an aquatic plant, growing in mats on the surface of water. It has branching thread-like underwater leaves and toothed floater leaves. In fast flowing water the floaters may not be grown. The flowers are white petaled with yellow centres and are held a centimetre or two above the water. The floater leaves are used as props for the flowers and are grown at the same time.
