= Whin Sill =

Layer of dolerite rock in northern England

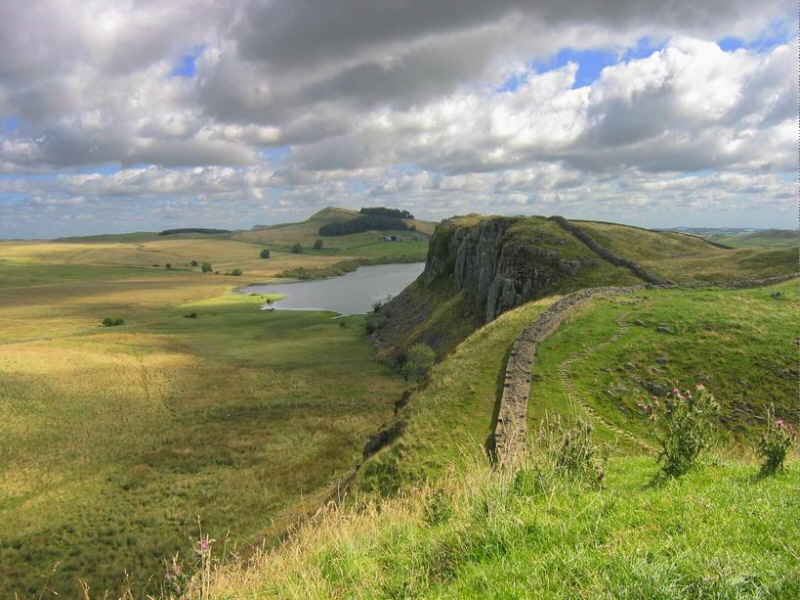
The Whin Sill at Crag Lough, showing Hadrian's Wall running along the top.

The Whin Sill or Great Whin Sill is a tabular layer of the igneous rock dolerite in County Durham, Northumberland and Cumbria in the northeast of England. It lies partly in the North Pennines Area of Outstanding Natural Beauty and partly in Northumberland National Park and stretches from Teesdale northwards towards Berwick.

It is one of the key natural features of the North Pennines. A major outcrop is at the High Force waterfall in Teesdale. Bamburgh Castle, Dunstanburgh Castle, Lindisfarne Castle and stretches of Hadrian's Wall all strategically take advantage of high, rocky cliff lines formed by the sill.

The Whin Sill complex is usually divided into three components: Holy Island Sill, Alnwick Sill and the Hadrian's Wall-Pennines Sill, which were created by separate magma flows, but at about the same time.

The Little Whin Sill is an associated formation to the south, in Weardale.

== Derivation of name ==
Much of the early study of geology began in the British Isles, whence much of the terminology is derived. Quarrymen of Northern England used the term 'sill' to describe a more or less horizontal body of rock. 'Whin' was applied to dark, hard rocks. As the intrusive igneous origin of the Whin Sill was determined in the 19th century, the term 'sill' was adopted by geologists for concordant, tabular intrusive bodies.

== Geology ==
Towards the close of Carboniferous Period and in the early Permian, some 295 million years ago (Ma), crustal extension caused by movement of the Earth's tectonic plates during the Variscan orogeny allowed the emplacement of igneous intrusions of magma across much of northern England of a suite of tholeiitic dolerite intrusions. These were largely concordant with the strata of the existing country rock. On cooling, these crystallised and solidified to form the Great Whin Sill. It is dated at around 301- 294 million years old, thus spanning the Carboniferous/Permian boundary at 299 Ma.

It underlies much of south and east Northumberland and the Durham Coalfield. Its maximum known thickness of around 70 metres (230 ft) occurs in the North Pennines.

Surface and subsurface records of the Great Whin reveal it is not always concordant over wide areas and often rises and falls in the stratigraphical succession in marked leaps and gentle transgressions different levels.

Studies of the petrology of the dolerites of the Whin Sill complex have revealed significant differences between the Little Whin Sill and the Great Whin Sill. The Little Whin Sill is olivine-bearing and believed to be composed of an early differentiate of the Whin dolerite magma. On the other hand, the Great Whin, non-olivine-bearing and slightly density graded, is a later differentiate of the Whin magma.

Two separate periods of Whin dolerite injection are confirmed by studies of vitrinite reflectance over the Alston Block where two periods of Whin contact metamorphism have been recognized. The two periods of Whin dolerite emplacement form part of the end-Carboniferous earth movements in northern England. They can be shown to have occurred between a period of compression from a west-south west direction and later gentle doming of the Alston Block near the Westphalian-Stephanian boundary, dated about 300–295 Ma.

The lithology is notable in many respects, including well developed pegmatite segregations which can be found in Upper Teesdale. Late stage hydrothermal mineralisation has filled the joints with pectolite. The dolerite has been carbonated as metasomatic selvages into veins and joints and other flaws to produce 'White Whin'. Thermal metamorphism of the country rock in the contact zone produced coarse grained marbles within the contact aureole in a small number of places in Teesdale.

Disused roadstone quarries along the course of the sill offer sections for its interpretation.

== Effects on landscape and geography ==
The regolith supports alpine/Arctic flora which includes spring gentian (Gentiana verna), bird's-eye primrose (Primula farinosa), mountain avens (Dryas octopetala) and Teesdale violet (Viola rupestris). This is an example of the intimate interaction and dependence of geology and ecology.

The resistance to erosion of the dolerite gives rise to a number of striking geomorphological features such as High Force, Low Force, Cauldron Snout, High Cup Nick, Scordale and Holwick Scars.

== See also ==
- Allolee to Walltown SSSI
- Bamburgh Coast and Hills SSSI
- Burnfoot River Shingle and Wydon Nabb SSSI
