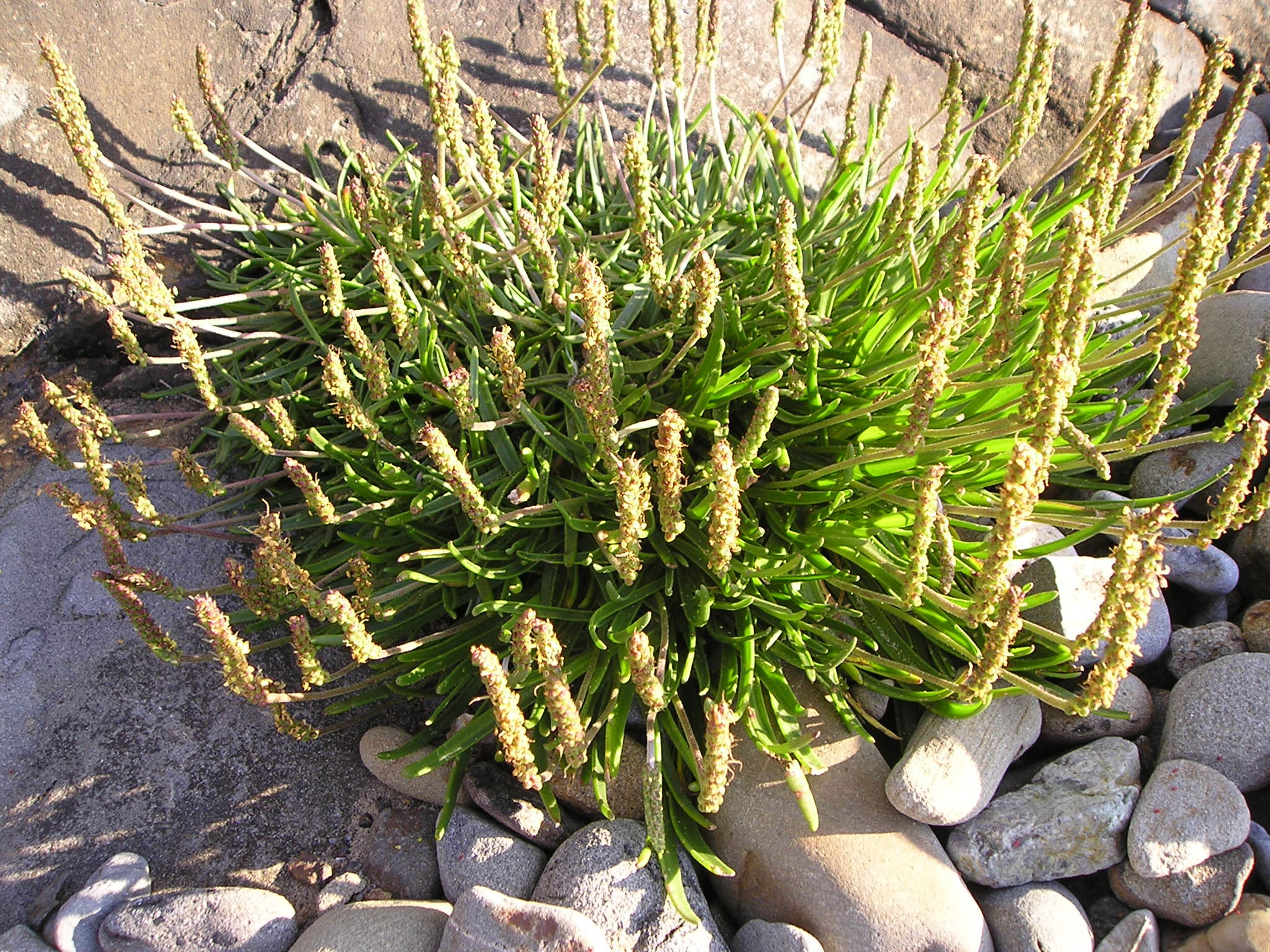

Conservation status
- Least Concern (IUCN 3.1)

Scientific classification
- Kingdom: Plantae
- Clade: Embryophytes
- Clade: Tracheophytes
- Clade: Spermatophytes
- Clade: Angiosperms
- Clade: Eudicots
- Clade: Asterids
- Order: Lamiales
- Family: Plantaginaceae
- Genus: Plantago
- Species: P. maritima

Binomial name
- Plantago maritima L.

Synonyms
- Arnoglossum maritimum (L.) Gray; Plantaginella maritima (L.) Fourr.

= Plantago maritima =

Species of flowering plant in the plantain family

Plantago maritima, the sea plantain, seaside plantain or goose tongue, is a species of flowering plant in the plantain family Plantaginaceae. It has a subcosmopolitan distribution in temperate and Arctic regions, native to most of Europe, northwest Africa, northern and central Asia, northern North America, and southern South America.

== Description ==
It is a herbaceous perennial plant with a dense rosette of leaves without petioles. Each leaf is linear, 2–22 cm (0.8–8.7 in) long and under 1 cm (0.4 in) broad, thick and fleshy-textured, with an acute apex and a smooth or distantly toothed margin; there are three to five veins. The flowers are small, greenish-brown with brown stamens, produced in a dense spike 0.5–10 cm (0.2–3.9 in) long on top of a stem 3–20 cm (1.2–7.9 in) tall.

=== Subspecies ===
There are four subspecies:

- Plantago maritima subsp. maritima. Europe, Asia, northwest Africa.
- Plantago maritima subsp. borealis (Lange) A. Blytt and O. Dahl. Arctic regions. All parts of the plant small, compared to temperate plants.
- Plantago maritima subsp. juncoides (Lam.) Hultén. South America, North America (this name to North American plants has been questioned).
- Plantago maritima subsp. serpentina (All.) Arcang. Central Europe, on serpentine soils in mountains.

=== Ecology and physiology ===
In much of the range it is strictly coastal, growing on sandy soils. In some areas, it also occurs in alpine habitats, along mountain streams. Some of the physiology and metabolism of this species has been described, of particular note is how the metabolism of this species is altered with elevated atmospheric carbon dioxide concentrations.

== Uses ==
Like samphires, the leaves of the plant are harvested to be eaten raw or cooked. The seeds are also eaten raw or cooked, and can be ground into flour.
