= Otterburn Training Area =

Military training area in Northumberland, England

- Otterburn
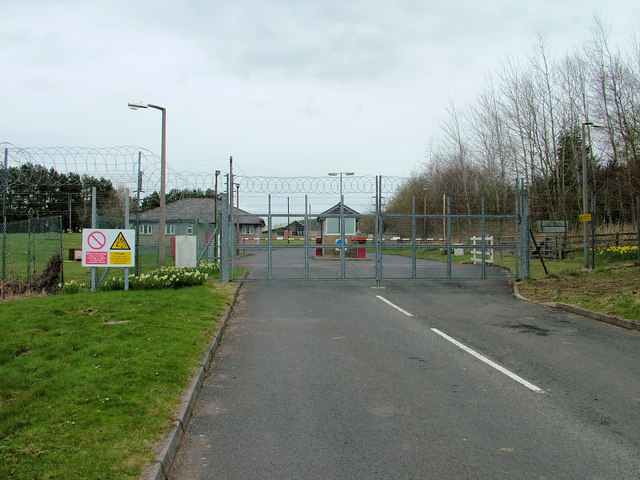
- The southern entrance to Otterburn MoD camp

Site information
- Type: Training Area
- Owner: Ministry of Defence
- Operator: British Army

Location
- Location within Northumberland
- Coordinates: 55°22′10″N 2°18′20″W

Site history
- Built: 1911
- Built for: War Office
- In use: 1911 – present

The Otterburn Army Training Estate is a military training area near Otterburn, Northumberland, in northern England. It is owned by the Ministry of Defence (MoD) and operated by Landmarc on contract from the MoD's Defence Infrastructure Organisation.

== History ==
The site was established in 1911 and covers about 242 square kilometres (93 mi^{2}) of the southern Cheviot Hills, 23% of the Northumberland National Park. The National Park was established in 1956, 45 years after establishment of the Artillery Range.

Otterburn is the UK's largest firing range, and is in frequent use. The ranges are used by AS-90 artillery and M270 Multiple Launch Rocket Systems; Otterburn is the only place in the UK where the MLRS can be fired, requiring an 11 mile long by 2 mile wide firing range. Because of the danger posed by live fire exercises, recreational use of the area is restricted, although it is possible for the public to use some parts of the estate subject to the relevant bylaws. The MoD publishes a booklet, Walks on Ministry of Defence Lands, which offers advice on this.

== Fatal Incidents ==
In 2016, a soldier of the Royal Regiment of Scotland, Conor McPherson, was shot in the back of the head and killed by a fellow British soldier on the Otterburn Heely Dod firing range.

Captain Philip Gilbert Muldowney was killed after an incident during a live fire training exercise on 25 January 2026. He served as a fire support team commander in the 4th Regiment Royal Artillery.

== Gallery ==
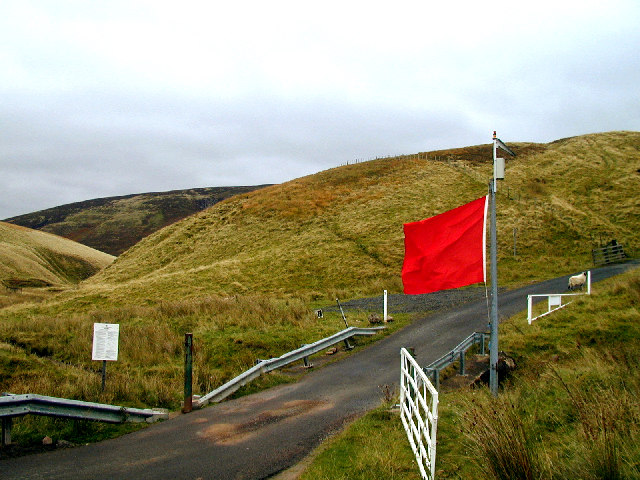
Otterburn Ranges. The road leading into the Ministry of Defence Ranges, and the red flag showing that the army are practising live firing there.

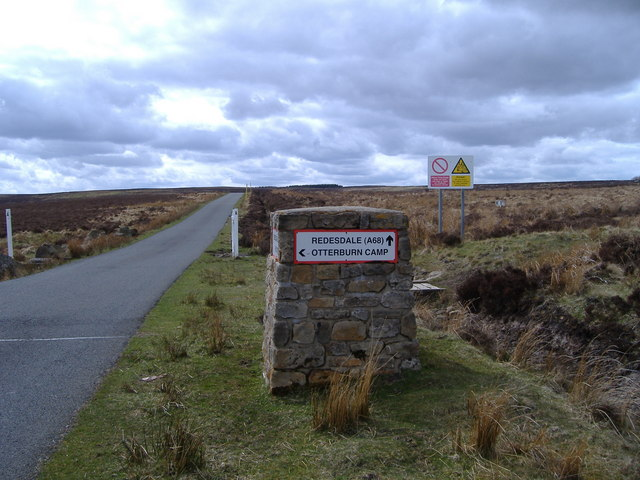
Signpost for Otterburn Crossroads on the MoD ranges

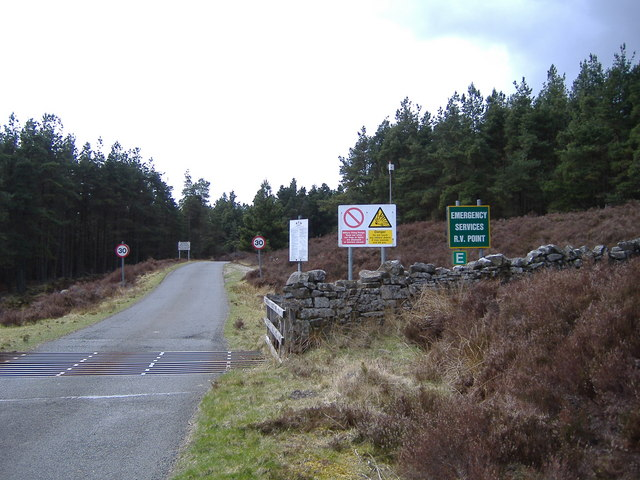
Entrance to the Otterburn Ranges near Holystone - note the cattle grid
