= Northumberland National Park =

National park in Northumberland, England

Coordinates: 55°19′N 2°13′W

- IUCN category V (protected landscape/seascape)
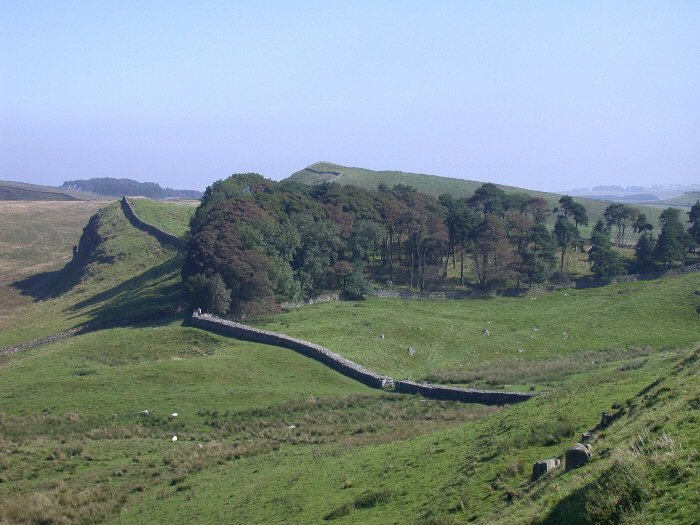
- View of Hadrian's Wall, Northumberland National Park

- Location: United Kingdom (North East England)
- Established: 1956
- Governing body: Northumberland National Park Authority
- Website: www.northumberlandnationalpark.org.uk

Northumberland National Park is the northernmost national park in England. It covers an area of more than 1,050 square kilometres (410 sq mi) between the Scottish border in the north to just south of Hadrian's Wall. The park lies entirely within Northumberland, covering about a quarter of the county.

Of the thirteen National Parks in England and Wales, Northumberland is the most remote from large urban areas, the least populated, and the least visited.

The park covers several distinct areas. In the north are the Cheviot Hills, a range of hills that mark the border between England and Scotland. Further south, the hills give way to areas of rolling moorland, some of which have been covered by forestry plantations to form Kielder Forest. The southernmost part of the park covers the dramatic central section of Hadrian's Wall, dating from the Roman occupation.

The 10,000-year history of human habitation of the region is explored through the many archaeological sites, ranging from prehistoric monuments and Roman remains to Pele towers, constructed as a defence against invading Scots and Border Reivers.

The Park's official symbol is the curlew.

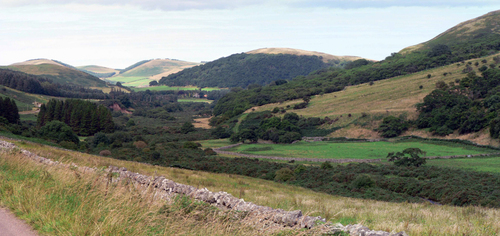
Looking north down College Valley in the Cheviot Hills

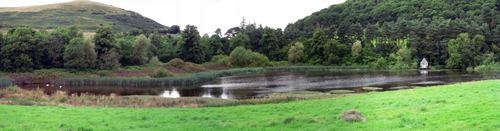
Hethpool Lake, north of Hethpool house

== Etymology ==
The Northumberland National Park takes its name from the English county of Northumberland. Northumberland means "country north of the River Humber" and is related to the name "Northumbria", referring to the former Anglo-Saxon kingdom which once covered much of Northern England. The national park lies totally within the boundaries of Northumberland.

== Geography ==
The Northumberland National Park covers a large area of Western Northumberland and borders the English county of Cumbria and the Scottish council area of The Scottish Borders. The national park encompasses much of the Cheviot Hills and adjoins the Southern Uplands of Scotland, which the hills are sometimes considered a part of. Since the Pennine Way runs through the national park, the Cheviot Hills are also considered a part of the northern Pennines although they are separated from the Cheviot Hills by the Tyne Gap, part of which lies within the southern extent of the national park. Part of Kielder Forest lies within the park, and in other areas forms a forest park. Kielder Forest is the largest man-made forest in Europe and surrounds Kielder Water.

== Otterburn Training Area ==
The Ministry of Defence in the United Kingdom owns much of the land in the national park as the Otterburn Training Area. Some parts of this training area are off-limits; others can be accessed only at certain times or with permission. The training area accounts for 23% of the Northumberland National Park.

== Dark Sky Park status ==
In December 2013 the International Dark Sky Association conferred Dark Sky Park status on an area including Northumberland National Park and Kielder; it is the largest protected Dark Sky Park in Europe.

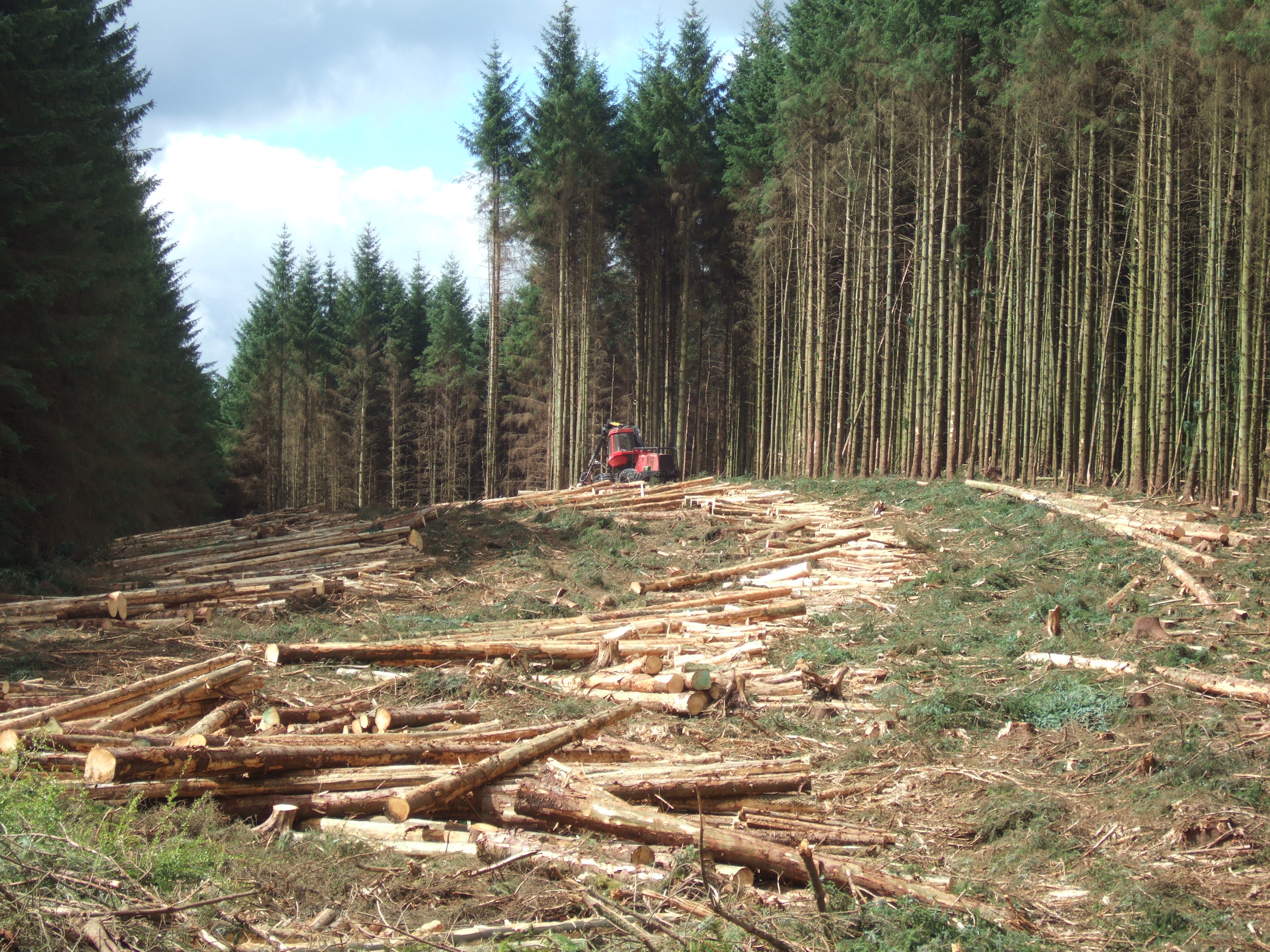
In the South of the Park, timber harvesting is integral to management of Kielder Forest.

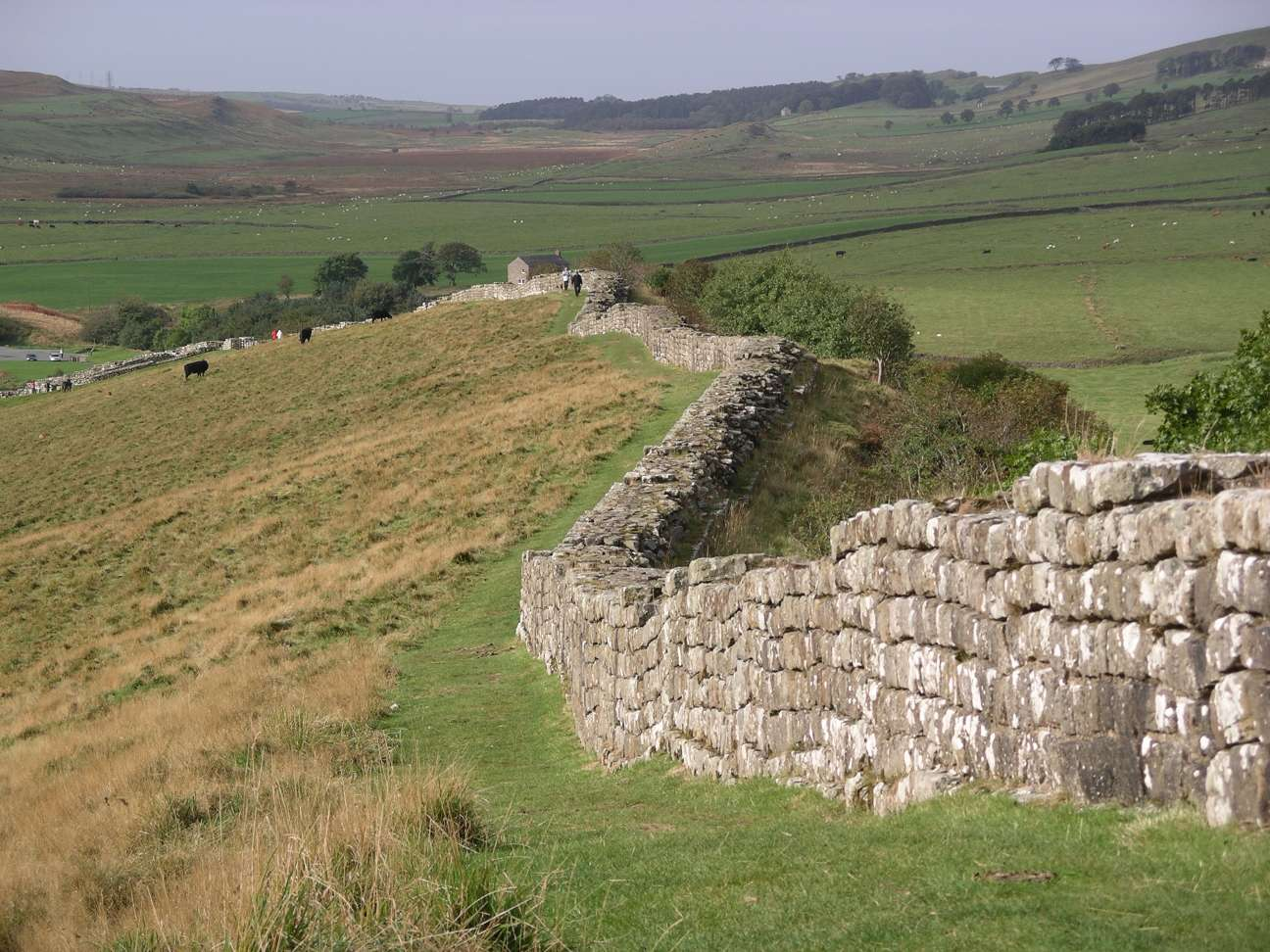
Hadrian's Wall is historically important, and is part of the National Park's significance

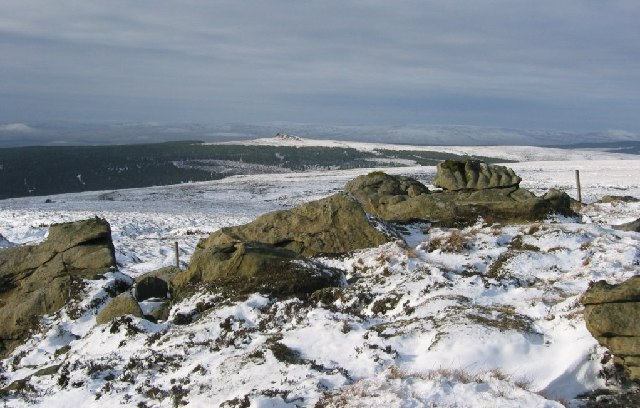
Sighty Cragg

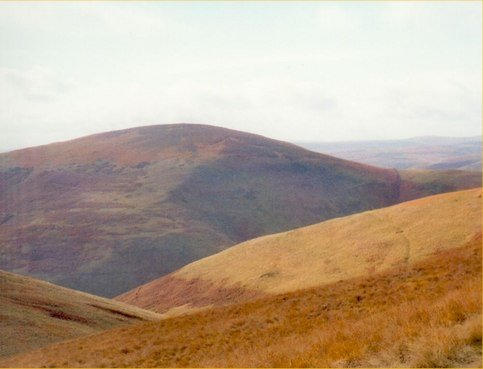
Shillhope Law

== Hills within the National Park ==
Summits with 30 metres or more of topographic prominence are listed here.

1. The Cheviot (816m)
2. Hedgehope Hill (714.4m)
3. Comb Fell (652.8m)
4. Windy Gyle (619m)
5. Cushat Law (616.2m)
6. Bloodybush Edge (609.8m)
7. The Schil (605.5m)
8. Dunmoor Hill (569m)
9. Wether Cairn (563m)
10. Beefstand Hill (562m)
11. Thirl Moor (558m)
12. Black Hag (549m)
13. Yarnspath Law (540.7m)
14. Newton Tors (537m)
15. Shill Moor (528.8m)
16. Ravens Knowe (527m)
17. Preston Hill (526m)
18. Broadhope Hill (517m)
19. Lint Lands (510.4m)
20. Birnie Brae (508m)
21. Brownhart Law (508m)
22. Hungry Law (501m)
23. Shillhope Law (501m)
24. Deel's Hill (495m)
25. Saughy Hill (494m)
26. Bell Hill (491m)
27. Nettlehope Hill (488m)
28. Dryhope Hill (486.4m)
29. Coldburn Hill (485m)
30. Greyhound Law (484m)
31. Ward Law (484m)
32. Raeshaw Fell (483m)
33. Yearning Law (477m)
34. Lumsdon Law (475m)
35. Peat Law (472m)
36. Leap Hill (471m)
37. Fulhope Edge (469m)
38. Mozie Law South Top (465m)
39. Wooplaw Edge (459m)
40. Swineside Law (457m)
41. Whar Moor (455m)
42. Cold Law (Harthope) (452m)
43. Sneer Hill (452m)
44. Broadside Law (444m)
45. Inner Hill (east Kidland) (443m)
46. Tosson Hill (441.7m)
47. Kyloe Shin (433m)
48. Inner Hill (west Kidland) (432m)
49. Simonside (430m)
50. White Law (Yetholm) (430m)
51. Langlee Crags (424m)
52. Shorthope Hill (421m)
53. Coldsmouth Hill (414m)
54. Ridlees Cairn (412m)
55. Darden Rigg (407m)
56. The Middle (397.4m)
57. Madam Law (397m)
58. Middle Hill (396m)
59. Green Side (395.5m)
60. High Knowes (395m)
61. Long Hill (395m)
62. Dumbhope Law (386m)
63. Ritto Hill (380m)
64. Crigdon Hill (379m)
65. Padon Hill (379m)
66. Gray Stone (366.1m)
67. Corsenside Common (366m)
68. Cold Law (Harbottle) (361m)
69. Yeavering Bell (361m)
70. Inner Hill (Coquetdale) (355m)
71. Dod Hill (353m)
72. Haddon Hill (352m)
73. Fredden Hill (347m)
74. Longknowe Hill (346m)
75. Winshield Crags (344.7m)
76. Great Hetha (343m)
77. Haddon Hill SW Top (342m)
78. Kilham Hill (338m)
79. Muckle Samuel's Crags (338m)
80. Cochrane Pike (335m)
81. Bell Crags (331.1m)
82. Hotbank Crags (327m)
83. Longknowe Hill NE Top (327m)
84. Hart Heugh (326m)
85. Midhopelaw Pike (326m)
86. Sewingshields Crags (325m)
87. Ell's Knowe (319m)
88. Ewe Hill (315m)
89. Cairnglastenhope (312.6m)
90. Harbottle Hill (303.7m)
91. White Law (Akeld) (302m)
92. Reaveley Hill (301.6m)
93. Dues Hill (301m)
94. Humbleton Hill (298m)
95. Calf Lee (289m)
96. Walltown Hill (289m)
97. Highshield Crags (283m)
98. Hartside Hill (282m)
99. Leighton Hill (279m)
100. Hare Law (278m)
101. Heddon Hill (277m)
102. Blakeman's Law (274m)
103. Garleigh Hill (268.4m)
104. Grindon Hill (256m)
105. Haltwhistle Common (252m)
106. Walwick Fell (250m)
107. Hazeltonrig (249m)
108. The Bell (247m)
109. Pawston Hill (231m)
110. White Hill (Kirknewton) (228m)
111. West Hill (215m)
112. Harehaugh Hill (182m)
113. White Hill (Kilham) (171m)

Hills over 300 metres outside the National Park boundaries are:

1. Peel Fell (602.7m)
2. Carter Fell (579m)
3. Deadwater Fell (569.4m)
4. Wool Meath (552m)
5. Sighty Crag (520m)
6. Glendhu Hill (514m)
7. Monkside (513.2m)
8. Ellis Crag (497m)
9. Black Knowe (492m)
10. Christianbury Crag (487m)
11. Blackman's Law (459m)
12. Purdom Pikes (454m)
13. Pike Knowe (449m)
14. Earl's Seat (397m)
15. Muckle Knowe (382m)
16. Scald Pike (366m)
17. Sappers' Pike (342m)
18. Hart Side (336m)
19. Hepple Heugh (336m)
20. Mount Gilbert (330m)
21. Long Crag (319.3m)
22. Ros Castle (316m)
23. Old Fawdon Hill (315m)
24. Shirlaw Pike (308m)
25. Cartington Hill (304m)
