= Linhope =

Village in Northumberland, England

Coordinates: 55.440°N 2.058°W

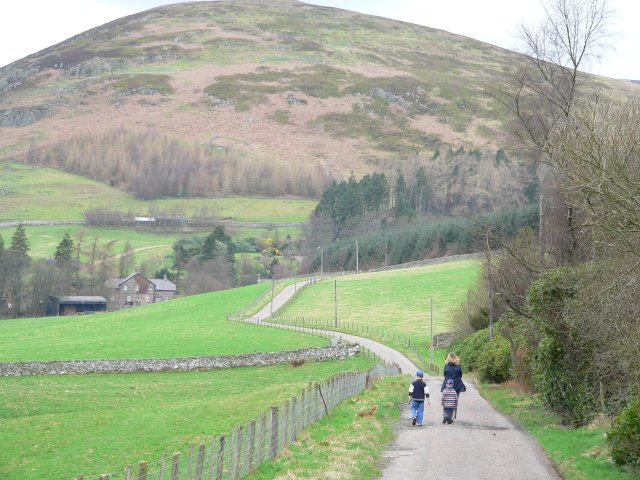
- Linhope and Ritto Hill

- Location within Northumberland
- OS grid reference: NT963162
- Civil parish: Ingram
- Unitary authority: Northumberland
- Ceremonial county: Northumberland
- Region: North East
- Country: England
- Sovereign state: United Kingdom
- Post town: ALNWICK
- Postcode district: NE66
- Dialling code: 01665
- Police: Northumbria
- Fire: Northumberland
- Ambulance: North East
- UK Parliament: Berwick-upon-Tweed

Linhope is a small village in the civil parish of Ingram, in Northumberland, England. It is located in the Cheviots on the River Breamish, and within Northumberland National Park.

Linhope Spout, a 18-metre (59 ft) waterfall that falls into a 5-metre (16 ft) plunge pool, is located on the Linhope Burn, a tributary of the Breamish, approximately 1 km (0.6 mi) north of the village. Walks up to Hedgehope Hill can be started from Linhope.
