= Breamish =

River in Northumberland, England

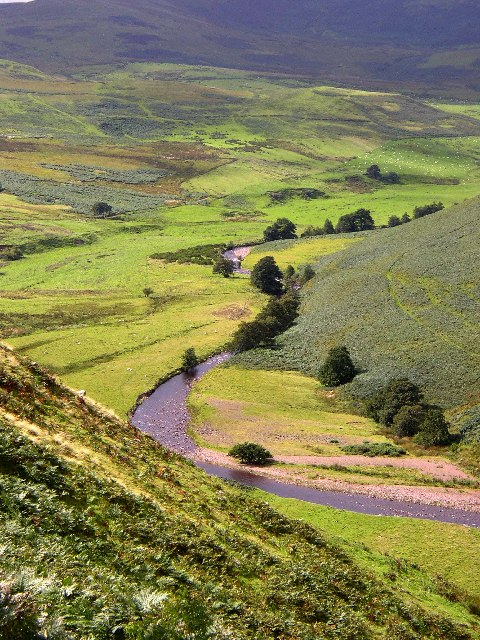
Upper reaches of the River Breamish

The Breamish is a river in Northumberland, England, which rises on Comb Fell in the Northumberland National Park on the southern side of The Cheviot. It is one of the nine rivers rising in the Cheviot Hills, the others being the College Burn, the Harthope Burn, the Bowmont Water, the Kale Water, the Heatherhope Burn, the Coquet, the Alwin and the River Rede.

There are two notable villages in the upper Breamish valley: Ingram and Linhope, both of which are in the Northumberland National Park.

The Breamish becomes the River Till in the locality of Bewick Bridge, 8.5 km to the southeast of Wooler; this is the only tributary of the River Tweed that flows exclusively in England.

== Etymology ==
The name Breamish is of Brittonic origin and derived from the verbal root breμ–. "bellow, bray, roar" (Welsh brefu). This is the origin of the rivers Braan, Scotland and Brefi, Wales.

== History ==
The Salters Road runs from the upper Breamish Valley across the Cheviots into Scotland. This was the historic pack-horse route for carrying salt from the coast into the Scottish borders. On the hills above the Breamish Valley are many archaeological remains of earlier occupations, from Neolithic and Bronze Age burial sites to hillforts, farmsteads, field systems and deserted medieval villages.

== Geography ==
The headwaters of the Breamish are surrounded by hills over 2000 feet (610 metres) above sea level, viz The Cheviot (815m), Hedgehope Hill (714m), Comb Fell (652m), Cushat Law (616m) and Bloodybush Edge (610m). Linhope Spout, a 60 ft waterfall that falls into a 16 ft plunge pool, is located on the Linhope Burn, a tributary of the Breamish, 1 km north of Linhope village.
