= Housedon Hill =

Hill in Northumberland, England

Coordinates: 55.58784°N 2.15704°W

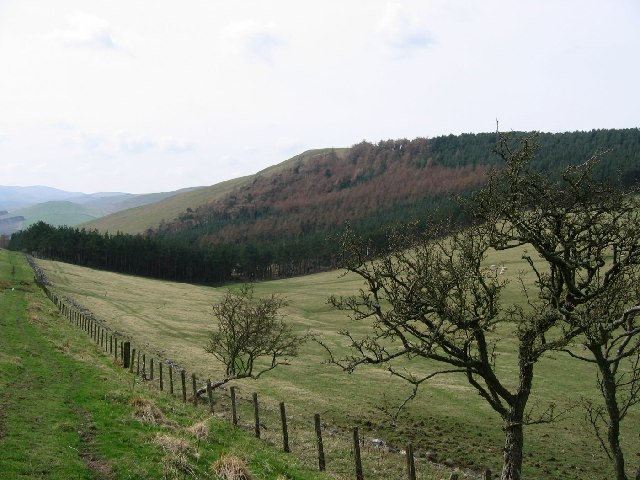
- Housedon Hill from the northeast

Highest point
- Elevation: 268 m (879 ft)
- Prominence: 184 m (604 ft)
- Parent peak: The Cheviot
- Listing: Marilyn

Geography
- Location: Cheviot Hills, England
- OS grid: NT902327
- Topo map: OS Landrangers 74, 75

Housedon Hill is a hill on the northwestern edge of the Cheviot Hills in Northumberland, England. It is the northernmost Marilyn in England, the summit lying only about 4 miles (7 km) from the Scottish border, which runs to the north and west.

It has an elevation of 268 m (879 ft) and a prominence of 184 m (604 ft) and is a Marilyn and a Clem.

The hill lies just outside the boundary of the Northumberland National Park. Previously there was no legal right of access to the hill. This has now changed, as the western side of the hill up to the summit is designated 'access land' under the terms of the Countryside and Rights of Way Act 2000. The simplest route of ascent starts from Housedonhaugh on the southwest flank of the hill, utilising the new access rights. The northwestern side of the Housedon Hill is cloaked in forestry plantations.
