= Peel Fell =

Mountain in Northumberland, England

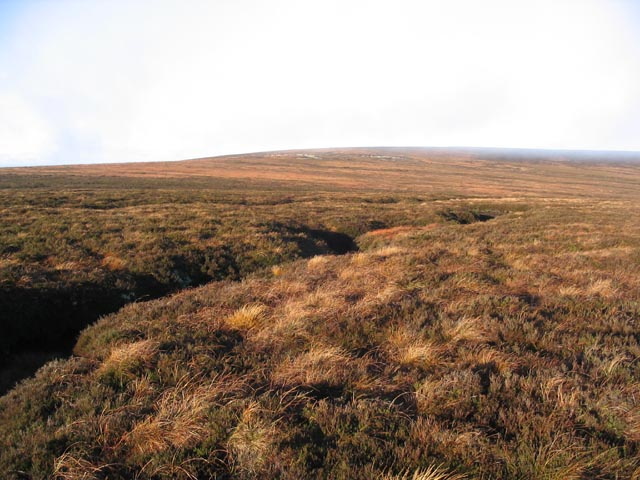
- Moorland, looking towards Peel Fell

Highest point
- Elevation: 600.3 m (1,969 ft)
- Prominence: c. 196 m (643 ft)
- Parent peak: The Cheviot
- Listing: Marilyn

Geography
- Location: Northumberland, England / Scottish Borders, Scotland
- Parent range: Kielder Forest
- OS grid: NY626997
- Topo map: OS Landranger 80

Peel Fell is the highest hill in the Kielder Forest region of England, making it the highest hill for several miles in each direction until the Cheviot Hills to the north-east are reached. Because of this, it has enough relative height to make it a Marilyn. It lies in both the county of Northumberland and the county of Roxburghshire, which is now governed by the Scottish Borders council, as the summit is on the border with Scotland.

The hill lies in a remote region three miles from the nearest road, surrounded by dense and often impassable forestry plantations. It can be most easily reached from Deadwater Farm at NY605969, or from the village of Kielder further south.

The Kielder Forest group of hills is large and sprawling. It includes two other Marilyns: Larriston Fells and Sighty Crag.
