= Newton Tors =

Coordinates: 55.5357°N 2.1473°W

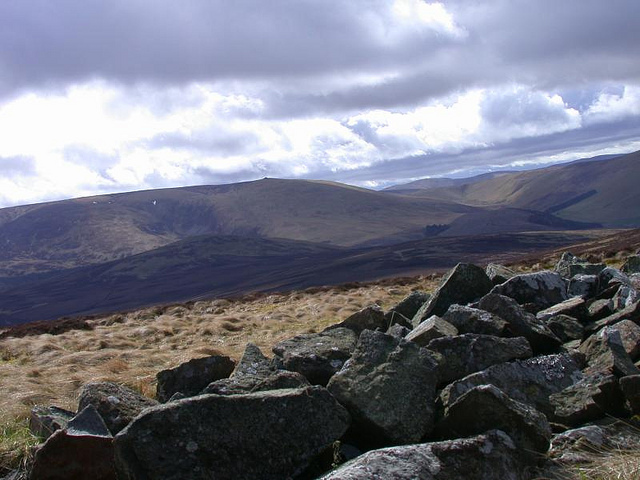
- View from Harelaw south towards The Cheviot

Highest point
- Elevation: 537 m (1,762 ft)

Geography
- Location: Cheviot Hills, England
- OS grid: NT908269
- Topo map: OS Landranger 74/75

The Newton Tors are large, free-standing residual masses (rock outcrop) that form the western rim of the Great Moor which runs from the market town of Wooler into the Cheviot Hills. They look down on the College Valley. The summit is at 537 metres (1,762 ft) which classifies it as a Dewey. Three separate outliers are known as Easter Tor, Wester Tor and Hare Law. Hare Law and Wester Tor are measured at 518m whilst Easter Tor is 438m in height.

== Access ==
The most common access point is from the northern end. The three main starting points are from Kirknewton, Old Yeavering via St Cuthbert's Way or within the College Valley itself. These routes end up at the same point with a steep walk from Torleehouse between Yeavering Bell on one side and Easter Tor on the other side. Both access points follow the path of St Cuthbert's Way for a short time.

The route down from the Tors at the southern end is usually taken before Coldburn Hill. The path descends to the floor of College Valley at Southernknowe. A third route runs east to Commonburn House and thence towards Wooler and lower ground. A third alternative descends by the plantation at Foulburn Gair and into Lambden Valley.

== Flora and fauna ==
The higher ground of the Tors is thick peat and used for grouse shooting. You can see the Grouse butts and the heather burning, which is undertaken to encourage grouse to breed and flourish. The red grouse is the predominant bird but there have been attempts to introduce the Black Grouse. The Tors are also a habitat for feral goats.
