= Brandon, Northumberland =

Village in Northumberland, England

Coordinates: 55.451°N 1.930°W

Brandon
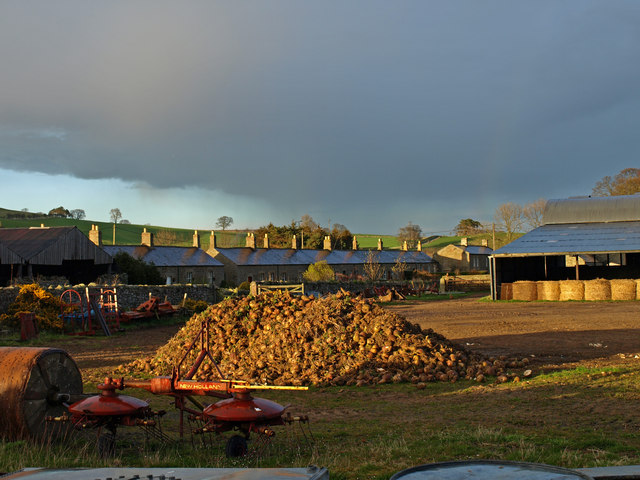

- Location within Northumberland
- OS grid reference: NU045175
- Civil parish: Ingram
- Unitary authority: Northumberland
- Shire county: Northumberland
- Region: North East
- Country: England
- Sovereign state: United Kingdom
- Post town: ALNWICK
- Postcode district: NE66
- Dialling code: 01665
- Police: Northumbria
- Fire: Northumberland
- Ambulance: North East
- UK Parliament: North Northumberland

Brandon is a village and former civil parish, now in the parish of Ingram, Northumberland, England. It is about 9 miles (14 km) north-west of Alnwick and 8 miles (13 km) south of Wooler in the Breamish Valley, just off the A697 north of Powburn. In 1951 the parish had a population of 58.

The village, or hamlet, is actually all one farm, farmed by the Shell family since at least the late 19th century. On the north side of the main road is a line of tied cottages and the old blacksmith's shop, still in good condition though lacking a blacksmith. On the south side is the traditional square of farm buildings and the Grade B listed farm house which now also provides 'bed and breakfast' accommodation. Hidden in the corner of a small paddock next to the road is the mill race, apparently just a line of very large flagstones but covering a deep and well preserved stone channel, which shows that the traditional square farm buildings once contained a mill. Some more modern buildings have been added on, mostly to the west end of the farm, however the older buildings are still in good original condition.

The farm has a mixed arable, livestock and contracting business. They were spared both the BSE and foot and mouth epidemics, in the first case by always having fed organic feeds free from animal protein.

== Governance ==
Brandon is in the parliamentary constituency of North Northumberland. Brandon was formerly a township in Eglingham parish; from 1866 Brandon was a civil parish in its own right until it was abolished on 1 April 1955 to form Ingram.
