= Stonehaugh =

Coordinates: 55.083°N 2.323°W

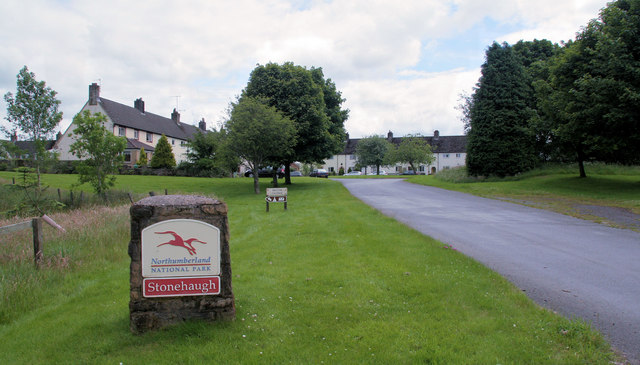

- Location within Northumberland
- OS grid reference: NY795765
- Unitary authority: Northumberland
- Ceremonial county: Northumberland
- Region: North East
- Country: England
- Sovereign state: United Kingdom
- Post town: HEXHAM
- Postcode district: NE48
- Police: Northumbria
- Fire: Northumberland
- Ambulance: North East
- UK Parliament: Hexham

Stonehaugh is a small settlement in Northumberland about 5 miles (8 km) west of Wark on Tyne and 4 Roman miles (6 km) north of Hadrian's Wall. It was purpose-built for housing forestry workers in the 1950s. Mechanization has reduced the necessity for such concentrated workforce, so the modern population is more diverse. It is located at the edge of the Wark Forest, and the National Cycle Route 68 (the Pennine Cycleway) passes through it. It was called one of the UK's best national park campsites by The Guardian, and a local artist's totem poles grace the local picnic area.

== Governance ==
Stonehaugh is in the parliamentary constituency of Hexham. Joe Morris of the Labour Party is the Member of Parliament.

Before Brexit, for the European Parliament its residents voted to elect MEPs for the North East England constituency.

For Local Government purposes, it belongs to Northumberland County Council a unitary authority.

Stonehaugh has its own parish council; Wark Parish Council.
