= College Valley =

Valley in Northumberland, England

Coordinates: 55.54°N 2.18°W

- Location within Northumberland
- OS grid reference: NT8928
- Unitary authority: Northumberland
- Shire county: Northumberland
- Region: North East
- Country: England
- Sovereign state: United Kingdom
- Post town: WOOLER
- Postcode district: NE71
- Dialling code: 01665
- Police: Northumbria
- Fire: Northumberland
- Ambulance: North East
- UK Parliament: Berwick-upon-Tweed

The College Valley is an area within the Northumberland National Park in northern England. It is one of five cuttings into the Cheviot Hills. The valley is owned by College Valley Estates which in turn is funded by a trust created by Sir James Knott MP.

The valley is spectacularly beautiful and affords a serenely satisfying ascent of the Cheviot – 815 metres (2674 ft) – the highest peak in the area.

The Estate covers approximately 12,000 acres (49 km^{2}) and is now managed by a board of directors whose duty is to manage it in a way that increases its value as an environmental, social and economic place of excellence. From north to south the estate is approximately 10 km and at its widest 7 km. There are over 105 km of roads and pathways criss crossing the College Valley.

The valley is open to the public, but access by car is restricted to permit holders only and these are limited on a daily basis.

== Access ==
There is one road into the valley. This starts at Kirknewton on the road between Wooler and Kirk Yetholm. On entering the valley itself the road splits into two, the right hand turn to Trowup burn. The left hand fork goes to the estate office and farm there up the main valley to the Cheviot itself.

== History ==
The valley is ringed by Bronze Age forts along the hill tops. There is evidence of habitation from very early times.

More recently the estate was owned by Cuthbert Collingwood, 1st Baron Collingwood, then the Grey family of Howick Hall followed by Arthur Sutherland.

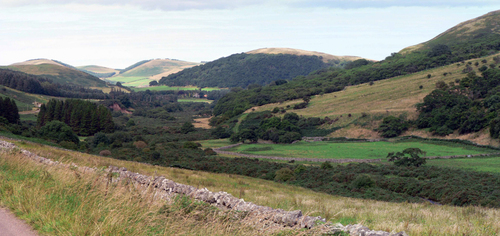
Looking north down the valley

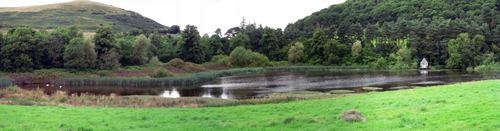
Hethpool lake, north of Hethpool house

== Houses in the valley ==
The estate office is at Hethpool House, Kirknewton. Apart from this there are a number of estate cottages designed in the arts and crafts style. Hethpool Mill is now converted into self-catering accommodation. There is evidence of habitation here back into the 13th century.

As the valley approaches the Cheviot itself it splits into two, the right hand fork going to Mounthooly (which is now a YHA hostel) and the left hand fork going up to Goldsceugh by way of Coldburn Cottage and Dunsdale House.

== Hills within the College Valley Estates ==
The Cheviot. 815m The Schil. 600m. Black Hag.549m. Scald Hill. 546m Newton Tors. 537m Preston Hill.520m. Broadhope Hill.516m Saughieside Hill.487m Coldburn Hill. 484m Whitelaw Nick. 430m. Loft Hill.410 m. Madam Law.397m Eccles cairn.350m. Sinkside Hill. Great Hetha. White hill. 226m.
