= Windy Gyle =

Mountain on the Anglo-Scottish border

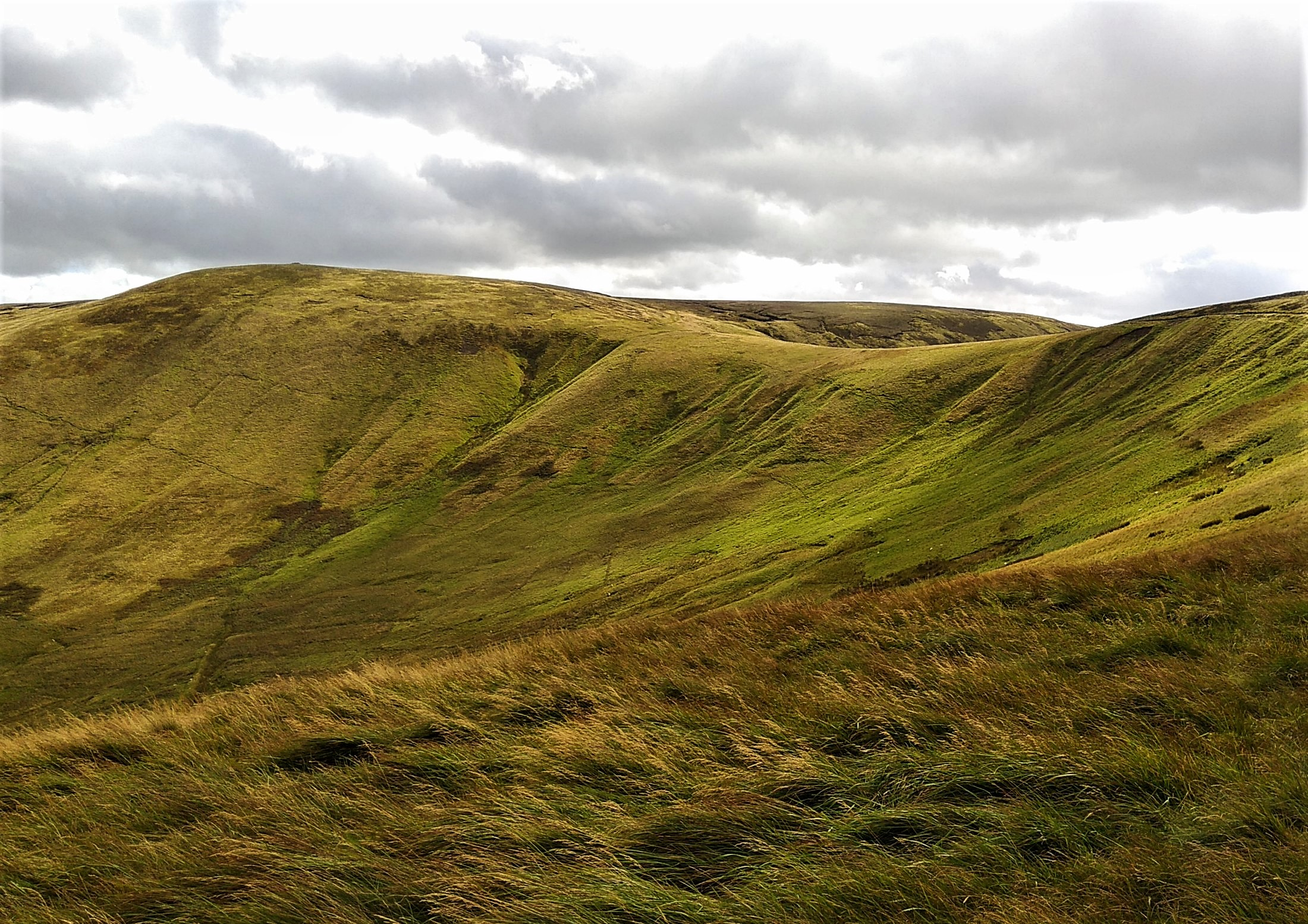

Highest point
- Elevation: 619 m (2,031 ft)
- Prominence: 113 m (371 ft)
- Listing: Hu,Tu,Sim, D, Hew, N,GT,DN,BL,Bg,Y,Cm
- Coordinates: 55.43138°N 2.23068°W

Geography
- Location: Scottish Borders, Northumberland, England/Scotland
- Parent range: Cheviot Hills
- OS grid: NT 85538 15210
- Topo map: OS Landranger 80

Windy Gyle is a mountain in the Cheviot Hills range, on the border between England and Scotland. Like the other hills in the area, it is rounded and grass-covered.

It is the highest summit on the border, although not the highest point as the border is higher where it runs along the western shoulder of The Cheviot, at a point called Cairn Hill West Top, or Hangingstone Hill. Provided the standard 30m prominence criteria are followed, and that the summit is classed as both Scottish and English, Windy Gyle is the most easterly mountain in Scotland.

The cairn at the summit of this hill is named Russell's Cairn and has a small depression suitable for shielding about 15 people from the wind; the border runs directly through the cairn although this can only be seen on the map, the fence which follows it in many places is absent here. The Pennine Way crosses the summit, thus providing one possible route of ascent. Windy Gyle may also be climbed from the Coquet valley to the south (England), or from Cocklawfoot to the north (Scotland). There are good views from the summit north towards the Scottish Borders, Eildon Hills and Edinburgh and south across the southern Cheviot Hills to the North Pennines.

== See also ==
- Anglo-Scottish border
