= Ingram, Northumberland =

Village in Northumberland, England

Coordinates: 55.442°N 1.977°W

Ingram
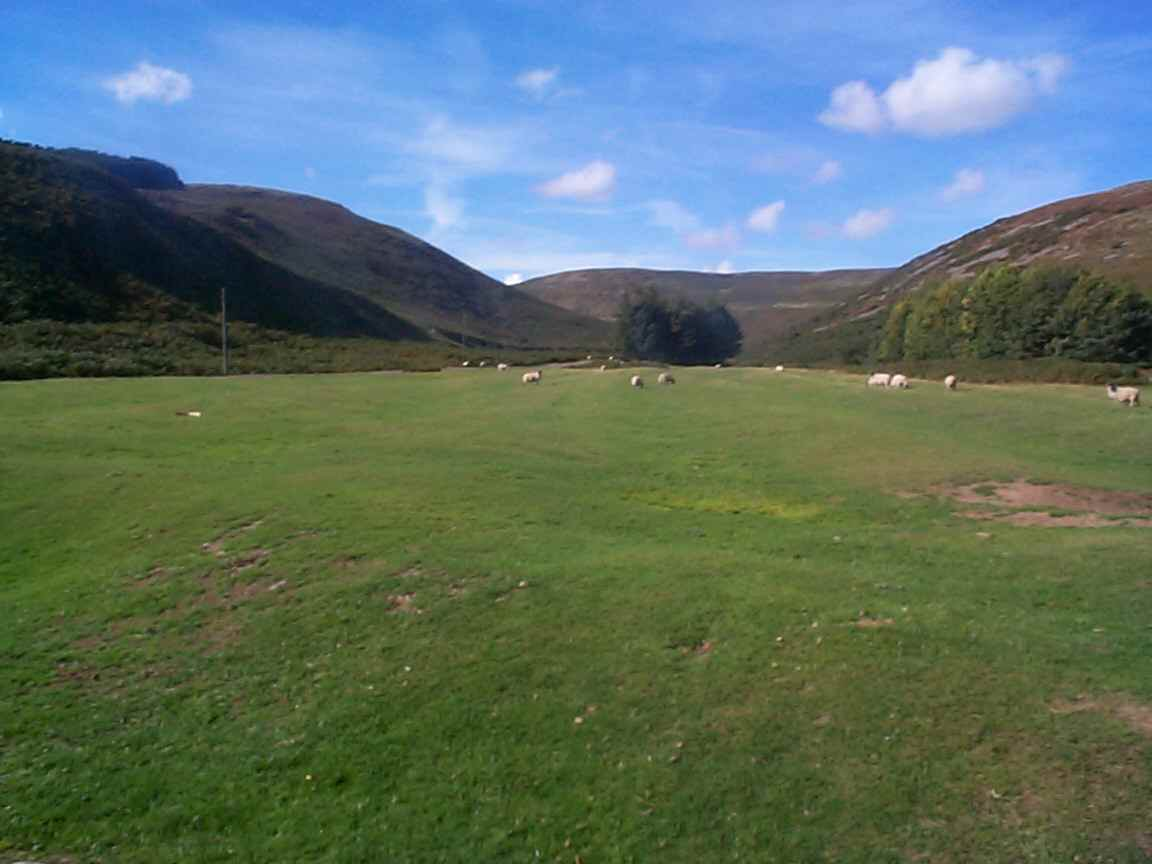
- View from the car park to the west

- Location within Northumberland
- Population: 119 (2011 census)
- OS grid reference: NU015165
- Civil parish: Ingram
- Unitary authority: Northumberland
- Ceremonial county: Northumberland
- Region: North East
- Country: England
- Sovereign state: United Kingdom
- Post town: ALNWICK
- Postcode district: NE66
- Dialling code: 01665
- Police: Northumbria
- Fire: Northumberland
- Ambulance: North East
- UK Parliament: North Northumberland

Ingram is a small village and civil parish in Northumberland, England. It is located in the Cheviots on the River Breamish, and on the edge of Northumberland National Park; it houses a National Park visitor centre.

== Governance ==
The parish was formed on 1 April 1955 from Brandon, Branton, Fawdon and Clinch and Ingram, Linhope, Greenshawhill and Hatside.

== Geography ==
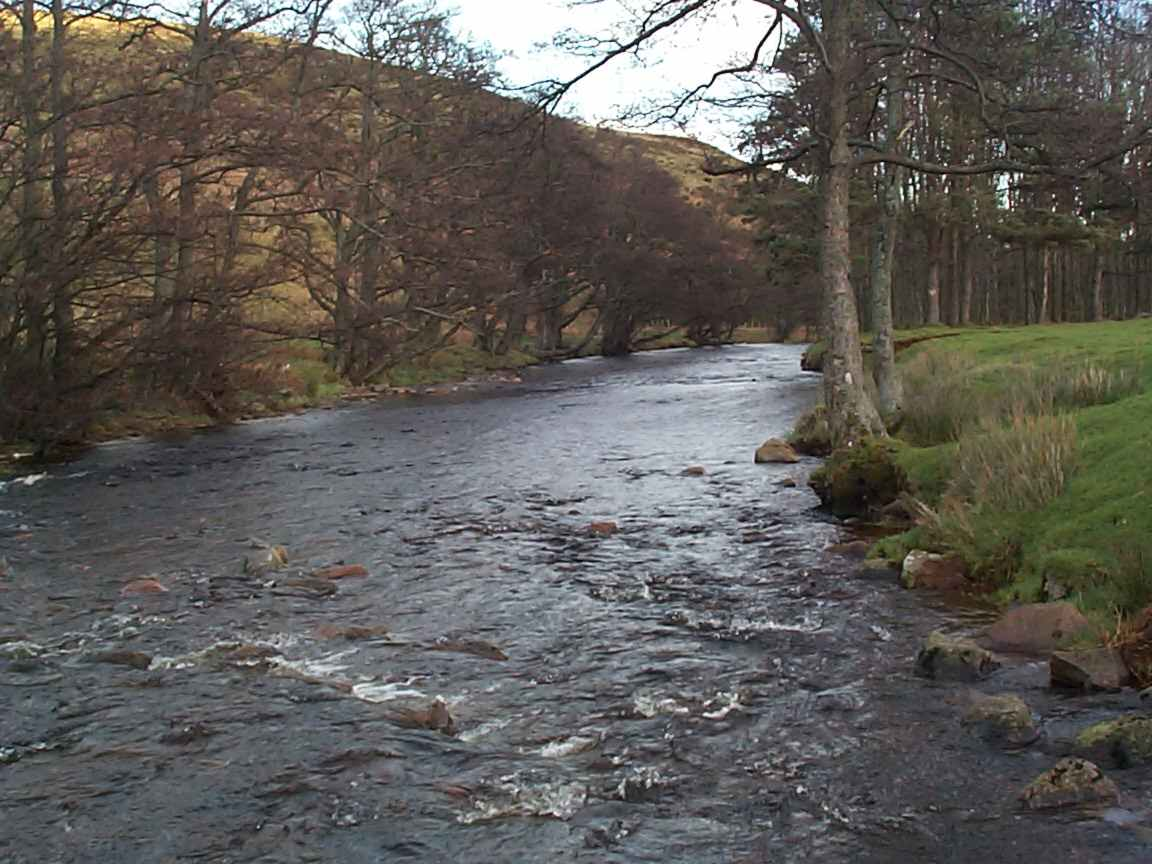
The river Breamish at Ingram

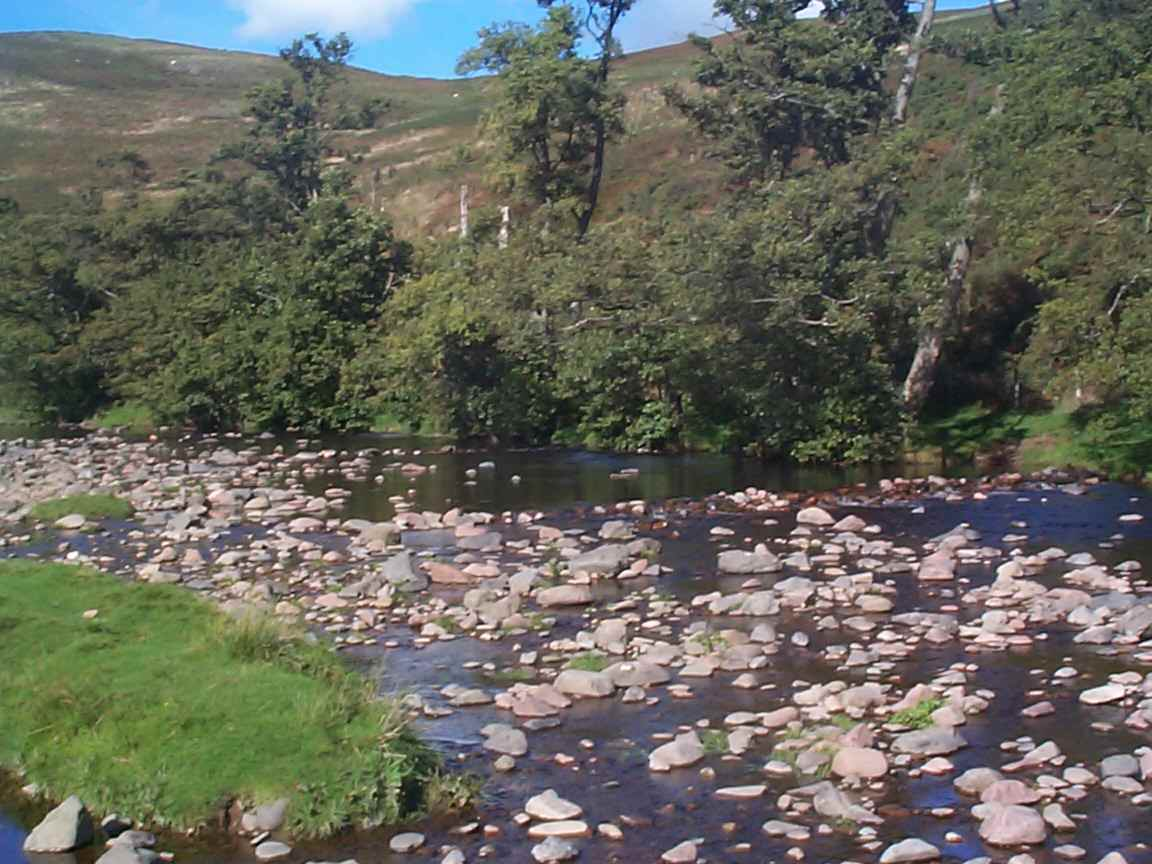
The river next to the car park - popular with kids in the summer

The Breamish Valley through which the small river runs is a very popular place with summer visitors and hill walkers. Driving past the visitor centre until coming to the public toilets and car park on the right, one reaches the starting point from which to climb the hills. Opposite the car park, halfway up the hill towards Brough Law, are the remnants of a Bronze Age settlement, easily missed, as it is merely an overgrown area surrounded by stones. Approximately half an hour is required to walk up the beaten path to the top of Brough Law.

== Church ==
The village has a Church of England church, St Michael and All Angels. The church was built before the Norman conquest however little of the original church has survived. The church was restored in the 19th century due to falling into disrepair. Features of the church include the 1662 octagonal font, the altar, pulpit and organ that were installed in 1911-12, and the lychgate built in 1928.

== Gallery ==
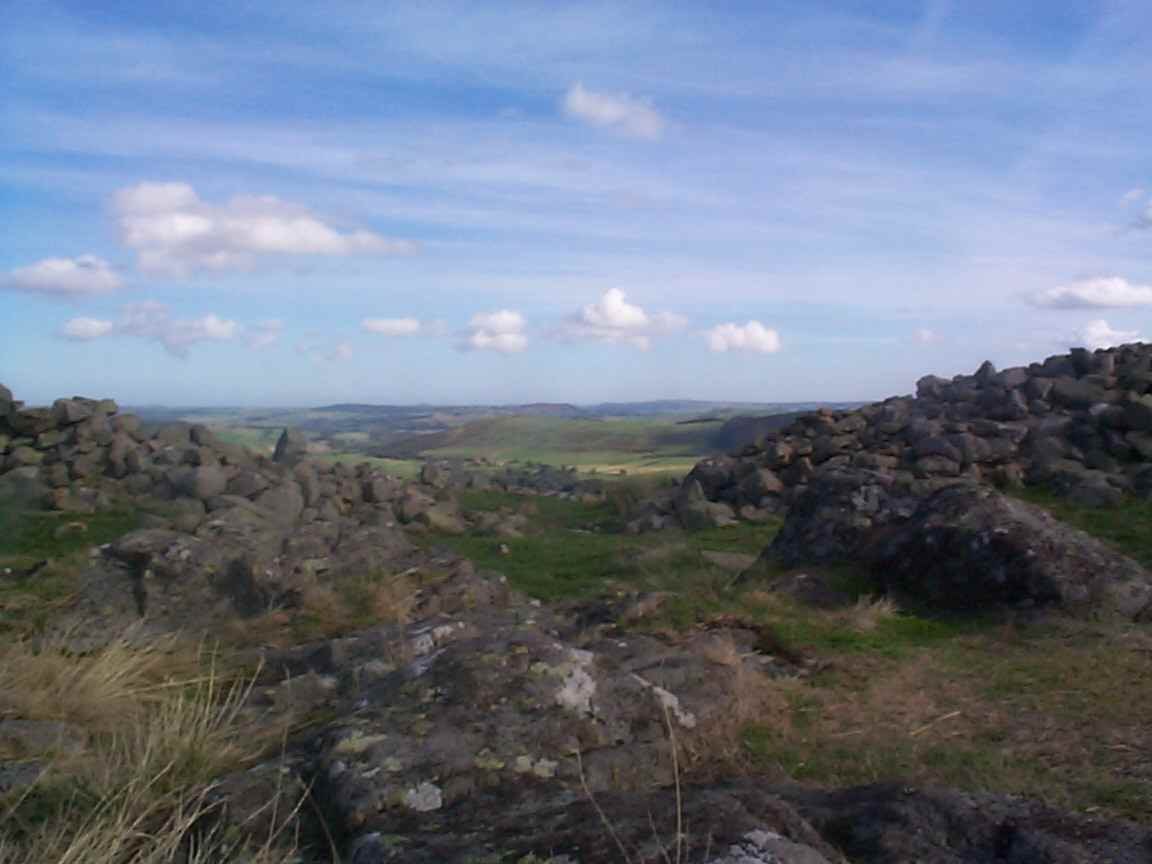
At the top of Brough Law - the nearby hill. It was once an old fort but is now just a circle of tumbled down stones.

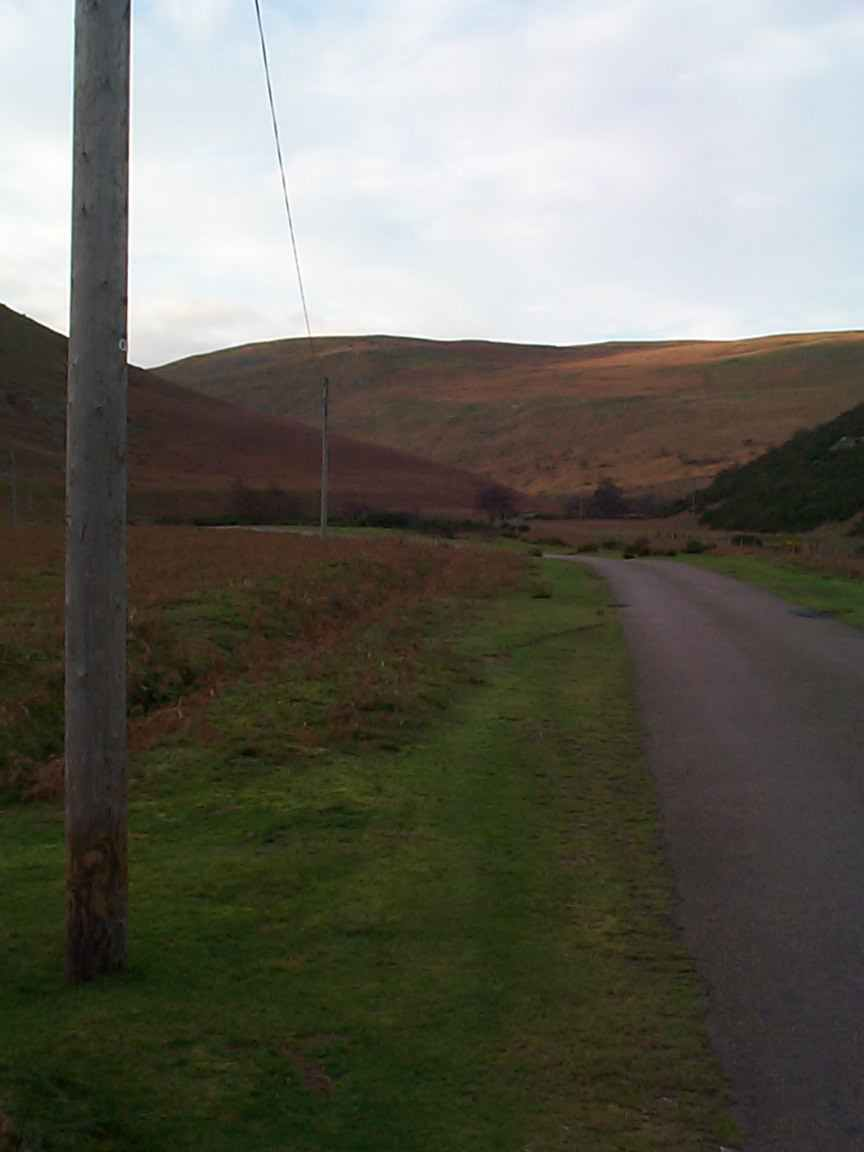
The road into the hills - it comes to a dead end
