= Billsmoor Park and Grasslees Wood =

Protected area in Northumberland, England

- Site of Special Scientific Interest
- Location within Northumberland
- Location of Billsmoor Park and Grasslees Wood.
- Area of search: Northumberland
- Grid reference: NY 946965
- Coordinates: 55.2618°N 2.0843°W
- Interest: Biological
- Area: 112 hectares (280 acres)
- Notification date: 1954
- Location map: DEFRA MAGIC map

Billsmoor Park and Grasslees Wood is the name given to a Site of Special Scientific Interest (SSSI) in Northumberland, North East England, designated in 1954. Billsmoor Park is an extensive alder woodland of a sort increasingly uncommon in the county; the much smaller Grasslees Wood is an oak woodland.

== Location and natural features ==
Billsmoor Park and Grasslees Wood are situated towards the north of Northumberland, in the north-east of England, 2 miles (3.2 km) north of Elsdon and 7.5 miles (12.1 km) west-south-west of Rothbury. Billsmoor Park, formerly a deer park, lies on the valley sides of the Park Burn, a north-running stream set amidst a west-facing lower slope at the south of the Simonside Hills. The roughly 0.7 miles (1.1 km) square park, extending to about 108.3 hectares (268 acres), falls from 240 metres (790 ft) above sea level at the south-east & south-west, to the centrally located stream which falls from 150 metres (490 ft) to 140 metres (460 ft) through the site. The B6341 road forms an eastern boundary of the park. The much smaller Grasslees Wood, slightly north of the park and on the other side of the road, is a 0.3 miles (0.48 km) strip of woodland up to 0.1 miles (0.16 km) wide and occupying 4.3 hectares (11 acres), and is orientated in a north-east - south-west direction at about 150 metres (490 ft).

Both park and wood are listed as an increasingly uncommon examples of an alder and oak woodlands, their scarcity arising out of clearfelling and over-grazing which prevents new growth from being established.

== Vegetation ==
Wooded areas of Billsmoor Park support alder (Alnus glutinosa) with some hazel (Corylus avellana) on lower lying wet soils, and an undergrowth of soft rush (Juncus effusus), tufted hair grass (Deschampsia cespitosa), wood-sedge (Carex sylvatica), greater-tussock sedge (C. paniculata) and pendulous sedge (C. pendula). Birch is found on steeper sections of the valley. Above the woodlands, open areas of the site support bracken and occasional birch, with grassland composed of mat grass (Nardus stricta), sheep's fescue (Festuca ovina), sweet vernal grass (Anthoxanthum odoratum) and common bent (Agrostis capillaris). In very wet areas of the site, mire vegetation arises, including bog myrtle (Myrica gale), broad-leaved cottongrass (Eriophorum latifolium), grass-of-Parnassus (Parnassia palustris) and purple moor-grass (Molinia caerulea) and, around springs, yellow pimpernel (Lysimachia nemorum), bugle (Ajuga reptans) and water mint (Mentha aquatica).

Grasslees Wood is dominated by sessile oak (Quercus petraea) with some birch (Betula pubescens). Groundcover indicative of a dry acid soil includes sweet vernal grass, common bent, creeping soft-grass (Holcus mollis), wood sorrel (Oxalis acetosella), tormentil (Potentilla erecta) and bracken (Pteridium aquilinum), together with remote sedge (Carex remota), oak fern (Gymnocarpium dryopteris) and enchanter's nightshade (Circaea lutetiana).

The condition of Grasslees Wood was judged to be favourable-recovering in 2013, with some concerns about deer grazing noted. Billsmoor Park was found to have an 'unfavourable-recovering' condition in the same year, with enclosures erected preventing deer grazing appearing to work well.

== Land ownership ==
Part of the area designated as Billsmoor Park and Grasslees Wood is owned by the Ministry of Defence.

== See also ==
- List of Sites of Special Scientific Interest in Northumberland
