= High Cove =

- Strike-slip fault
- Location in Northumberland
- Coordinates: 55.276°N 2.071°W
- Grid position: NY956980
- Location: Northumberland, England, UK

High Cove is a slip feature to the west of Grasslees Burn in the Simonside Hills, Northumberland, England. It contains several small rifts and caves in gritstone, up to 3 metres in length. In 1985, the Moldy Speleological Group explored four caves at High Cove, then in 2015 a further four were discovered by Black Rose Caving Club.
