= Shillhope Law =

Hill in Northumberland, England

Coordinates: 55.38111°N 2.20198°W

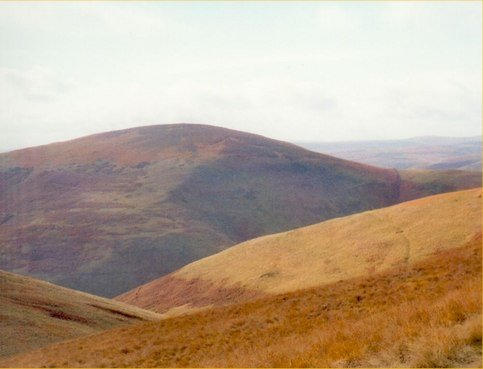
- Shillhope Law from Saughy Hill to the east

Highest point
- Elevation: 501 m (1,644 ft)
- Prominence: 158 m (518 ft)
- Parent peak: The Cheviot
- Listing: Marilyn

Geography
- Location: Cheviot Hills, England
- OS grid: NT873097
- Topo map: OS Landranger 80

Shillhope Law is a hill in the southern Cheviots, a range of hills in Northumberland, England. Shillhope Law is a relatively unremarkable member of this group; in common with its neighbours it has a small summit and steep, grassy sides falling to deeply incised valleys on either side. However, unlike its neighbours, the ridge connecting Shillhope Law to the higher dome of The Cheviot to the north is bisected by a low col at 343 metres (1,125 ft) m, giving it enough relative height to be a Marilyn. It has an elevation of 501 m (1,644 ft) and a prominence of 158 m (518 ft).

The narrow road that climbs up Coquetdale from Alwinton to the foot of Shillhope Law eases any access problems. On the other side of the valley lies the Otterburn Training Area and training (without live ammunition) can take place on the northern side of Shillhope Law. Shillhope Law can be easily climbed from the farms on its western side, Barrowburn and Shillmoor, although the ascent is steep. These two climbs can be combined to give a circular walk of about 5 miles (8.0 km).

The view is not far-reaching in any direction because numerous hills and ridges of the same height or higher in all directions except south and south-east.

== See also ==
- List of Marilyns in England
