= Long Crag =

Hill

Coordinates: 55.35608°N 1.90376°W

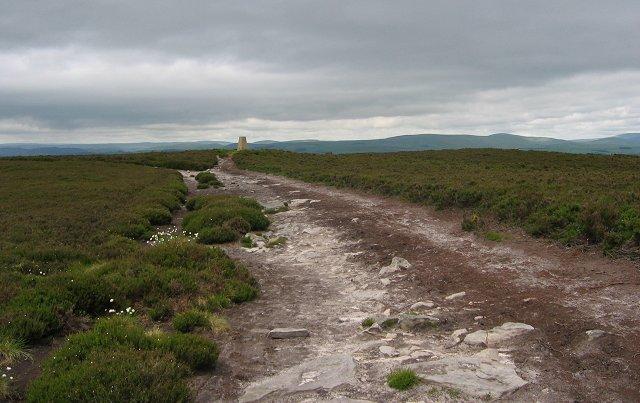
- Long Crag summit

Highest point
- Elevation: 319 m (1,047 ft)
- Prominence: c. 169 m
- Parent peak: The Cheviot
- Listing: Marilyn

Geography
- Location: Northumberland, England
- OS grid: NU062069
- Topo map: OS Landranger 81

Long Crag is a hill to the north of Rothbury in Northumberland, England. It lies within the Thrunton Woods, a Forestry Commission-owned area of forestry plantations.

Thrunton Woods have many marked trails provided by the Forestry Commission, and there are many routes to the summit.
