= Wark Forest =

- Location within Northumberland
- Interactive map of Wark Forest

Geography
- Location: Northumberland, England
- OS grid: NY735775
- Coordinates: 55.091°N 2.417°W

Wark Forest is the southern part of Kielder Forest in Northumberland, England. Wark Forest is found within the south-west tip of Northumberland National Park. It is near the village of Wark on Tyne to the south.

The forest covers 10,467 hectares. The Wark Burn and waterfalls are located in the forest.

== History ==
In February 1990, the body of an unknown man was found in the forest. Thirty-five years later, in January 2025, Locate International issued an anniversary appeal seeking assistance in identifying the man.
