= Branton, Northumberland =

Village in Northumberland, England

Coordinates: 55.440°N 1.928°W

Branton
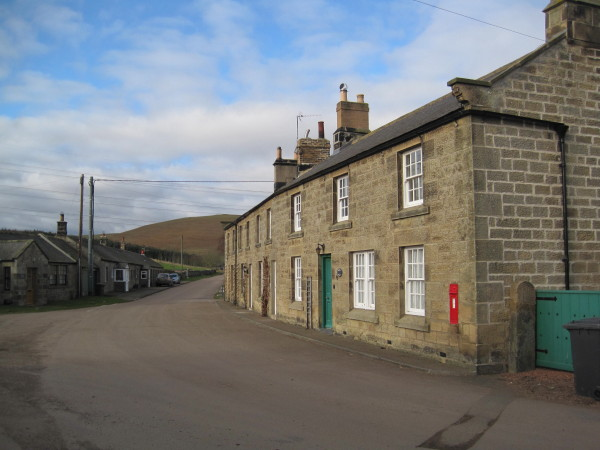

- Location within Northumberland
- OS grid reference: NU046162
- Civil parish: Ingram
- Unitary authority: Northumberland
- Ceremonial county: Northumberland
- Region: North East
- Country: England
- Sovereign state: United Kingdom
- Post town: ALNWICK
- Postcode district: NE66
- Dialling code: 01665
- Police: Northumbria
- Fire: Northumberland
- Ambulance: North East
- UK Parliament: North Northumberland

Branton is a village and former civil parish, now in the parish of Ingram, in Northumberland, England. It is about 9 miles (14 km) west of Alnwick. In 1951, the parish had a population of 50.

== Governance ==
Branton is in the parliamentary constituency of North Northumberland. Branton was formerly a township in Eglingham parish. From 1866, Branton was a civil parish in its own right until it was abolished on 1 April 1955 and merged with Ingram.
