= Simonside Hills =

Hills in Northumberland, England

- Hills
- Location in Northumberland
- Coordinates: 55.281°N 1.962°W
- Grid position: NZ025985
- Location: Northumberland, England, UK

The Simonside Hills are a hill range in Northumberland, England near the town of Rothbury. Most of the hills are around 300–400 metres (980–1,310 ft) high and are popular spots for hikers in the area. The highest point is Tosson Hill at 440 metres (1,444 ft).

There are several single pitch rock climbing crags dotted along the hillside, notably Simonside North Face and Ravensheugh.

== Etymology ==
In a document dated to 1279 Simonside was called Simundessete. By 1580 the name had become Simontside. The name may be a corruption of Sigemund's seat or Sigemund's settlement. Sigemund or Sigmund is the name of an old Germanic hero from the Volsunga Saga and the Nibelungenlied who is mentioned in the Anglo-Saxon poem Beowulf. WW Tomlinson, in his Comprehensive Guide To Northumberland (1916), stated that "Simon of mythology was, it seems, a domestic brewer to King Arthur, identical with the German Sigmund, and very fond of killing dragons". This points to the possibility that the Simon of Simonside Hill is the Sigemund mentioned in Beowulf and subsequently Norse and Teutonic myths. In Scandinavia and Germany, Sigmund is not generally associated with dragon-slaying, his son Sigurd or Siegfried is. His killing of a dragon was mentioned in Beowulf, however.

An alternative derivation for the name is a corruption of "seaman's sight", allegedly because the hills are visible from the North Sea. . This is almost certainly false etymology, however, as the word (ge)sete means seat or settlement and not sight. The Old English word for sight is gesiht and the old English for seaman is sæmanna and thus Seaman's Sight (or "Sæmannas(ge)siht") is unlikely to have become Simundessete in Middle English.

== Folklore ==
In Rothbury folklore Simonside Hills overlooking Rothbury has a mythical creature called a deaugar (Norse for 'dwarf'). It is said that the creature lures people at night by its lantern light towards bogs or cliffs in order to kill them. The village below the hills Rothbury has an art gallery called Red Deaugar Art Gallery named after the creature. There is also an annual 10-mile winter nighttime trail run in the Simonside Hills celebrating this folklore, called The Duergar Nightcrawler

== Protected area ==
Simonside Hills are designated as a Site of Special Scientific Interest (SSSI). It is protected because of the diversity of habitats found here that include moorland, blanket mire, woodlands and grassland.

=== Biology ===
Much of the moorland is managed for grouse. In older stands of heather, moss species include Sphagnum capillifolium and Plagiothecium undulatum. Plant species in heather moorland include Lesser twayblade. In the blanket bog, plant species include cloudberry, bog myrtle, common butterwort and round-leaved sundew.

Woodland is found on valley slopes. Tree species include alder, downey birch, rowan, sessile oak and juniper.

=== Land ownership ===
Part of Simonside Hills SSSI is owned by the Ministry of Defence.

== Geodesy ==
Up to 1919 one of the hills of Simonside was the origin (meridian) of the 6 inch and 1:2500 Ordnance Survey maps of Northumberland. After that the maps of Northumberland were drawn according to the meridian of Brandon Down in Durham.

== In popular culture ==
Vera, an ITV crime drama, had an episode that was filmed at Simonside Hills, this being Darkwater (Season 8 Episode 4).

== See also ==
- Billsmoor Park and Grasslees Wood SSSI
- High Cove
