= Sighty Crag =

Hill in northern England

Coordinates: 55.12087°N 2.62715°W

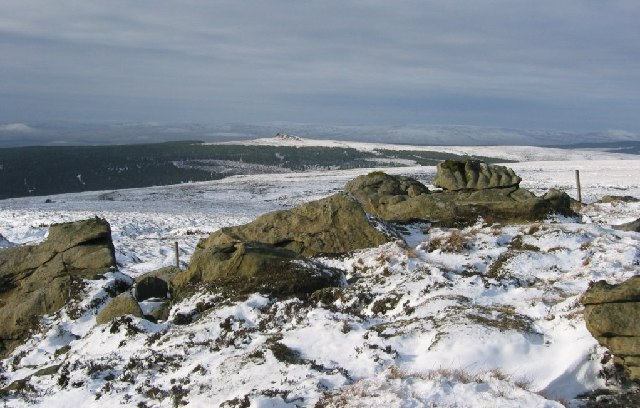
- The summit of Sighty Crag

Highest point
- Elevation: 520 m (1,710 ft)
- Prominence: 297 m (974 ft)
- Parent peak: The Cheviot
- Listing: Marilyn

Geography
- Location: Kielder Forest, England
- OS grid: NY601809
- Topo map: OS Landranger 80

Sighty Crag is a[hill in the southern part of the Kielder Forest region in northern England, a region which also includes its fellow Marilyns of Peel Fell and Larriston Fells. It is separated from its higher and more shapely counterpart, Peel Fell, by the low valley in which sits the village of Kielder.

It has an elevation of 520 m (1,710 ft) and a prominence of 297 m (974 ft) and is classed as a Marilyn. The summit is marked by a wind-worn outcrop of fell sandstone.

The hill is situated in a particularly remote part of northern Cumbria, although the Northumberland border runs over the north top just 600 m (660 yd) from the top. It is four miles (6 1/2 km) from the nearest road, making any walk to the summit and back at least eight miles (13 km) long. Though not especially high, in terms of distance from civilisation it is the remotest Marilyn in the whole of England.

== See also ==
- List of Marilyns in England
