= Hedgehope Hill =

- Location within Northumberland

Highest point
- Elevation: 714 m (2,343 ft)
- Listing: Hewitt
- Coordinates: 55°28′19″N 2°05′25″W

Geography
- Location: Cheviot Hills, Northumberland
- OS grid: NT9438619796
- Topo map: OS Landranger 80

Hedgehope Hill is a mountain in the Cheviot Hills of north Northumberland in northeast England, and categorised as a Hewitt. It is the second-highest mountain in the area after The Cheviot itself.

At a height of 714 metres (2,343 ft) and a distance of about 3 miles (4.8 km) from the Scottish border, it is best climbed from Langleeford in the Harthope Valley, over which it looms. The Harthope valley is accessible by a minor road from near Wooler to the northeast. A slightly gentler climb, though a longer distance, is from Linhope in the Breamish valley, approaching from the south east. An alternative route to the summit could involve a long day's climb of both the Cheviot and Hedgehope Hill, starting and finishing at Langleeford. It is a steep climb from any approach, best reserved for fitter walkers though the steepest inclines are not long in distance.

Hedgehope has steeper sides than the taller but flatter-topped Cheviot and affords excellent views on all sides. On a clear day, views stretch to Blyth down the coastline up to 40 miles (60 km) away. Conversely, the mountain can be viewed on a clear day from most areas of Northumberland and even as far south as central County Durham.

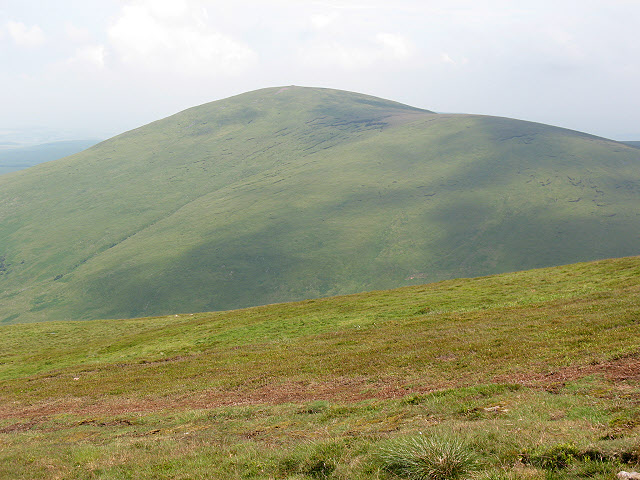
Hedgehope Hill from Scald Hill

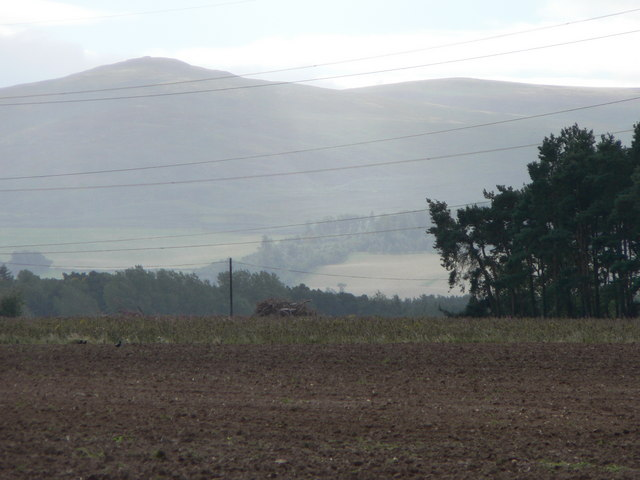
Hedgehope above Fenton Wood
