= Thrunton Wood =

Woodland and open moor in Northumberland

Coordinates: 55.36711°N 1.87592°W

Thrunton Wood is an area of woodland and open moor, and is located 5 miles (8.0 kilometres) north of Rothbury, which in itself a small market town in Northumberland. It is a popular destination with walkers/hikers, mountain bikers and horse riders, and is home to two waymarked walking trails: Castle Hill walk (5 miles), and Crag Top walk (1 mile).

There is an Iron Age fort on Castle Hill, and Thrunton Wood is home to several caves, including Macartney's Cave, once home to a local monk, and Thomas Wedderburn's Hole, where a local highwayman reputedly once hid from the law.

It was heavily affected by Storm Arwen (back in November 2021) which made it mostly inaccessible to public due to a large number of fallen/uprooted trees. More recently, a lot of the trees have been cut down.

There is also a popular trout fishery nearby, located just a quarter mile to the east.
