= Ros Hill =

Mountain in Northumberland, United Kingdom

Coordinates: 55.52138°N 1.87327°W

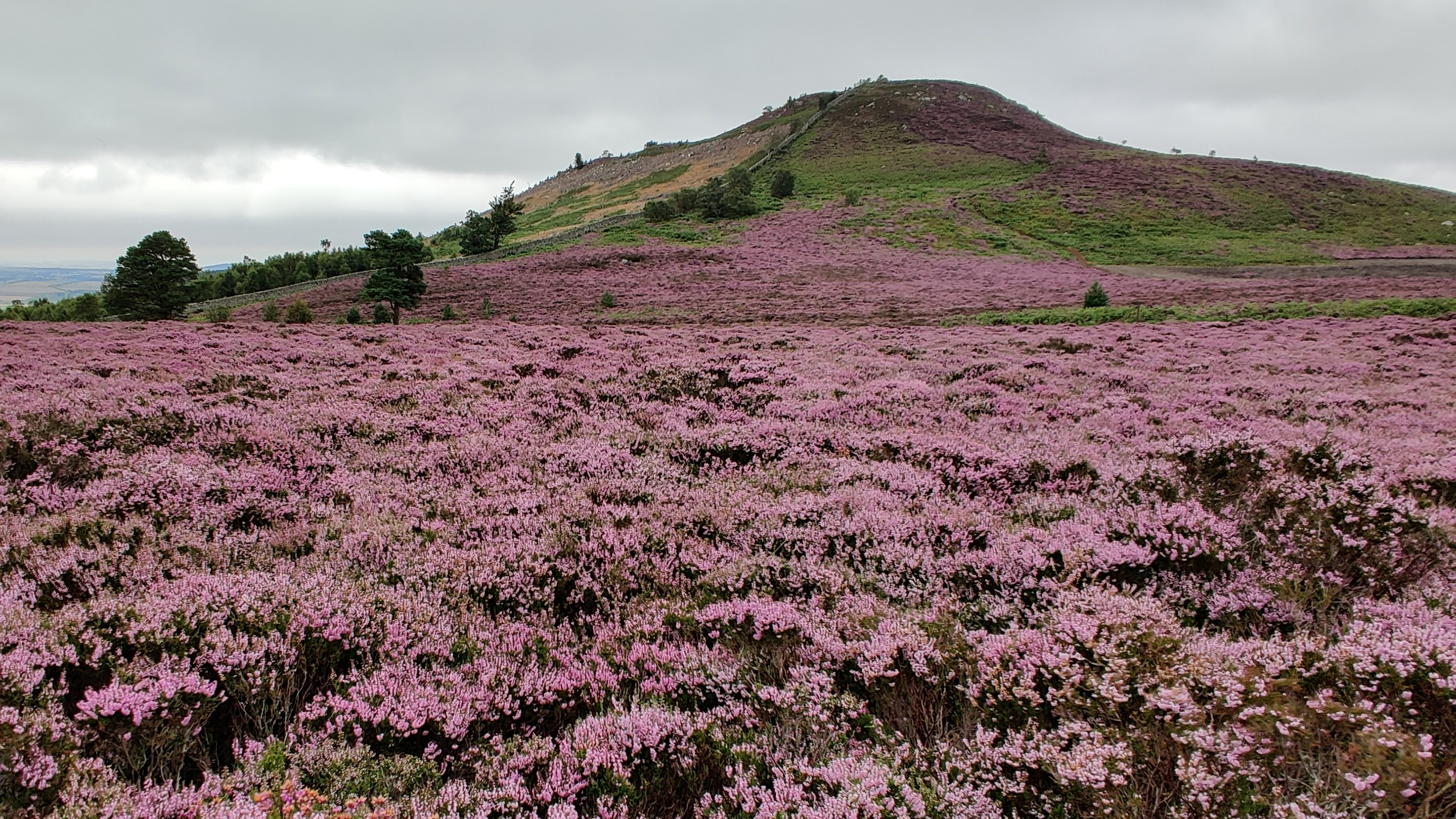
- Ros Hill from the road across Hepburn Moor

Highest point
- Elevation: 315 m (1,033 ft)
- Prominence: c. 222 m (728 ft)
- Parent peak: The Cheviot
- Listing: Marilyn

Geography
- Location: Northumberland, England
- OS grid: NU081253
- Topo map: OS Landranger 75

Ros Hill, also known as Ros Castle due to the 3,000-year-old Iron Age hillfort, a 1.2-hectare (3-acre) scheduled monument on its summit, is a hill in the county of Northumberland in northern England. It is the highest point of a low range of hills stretching from Alnwick to Berwick-upon-Tweed — the Chillingham Hills. Other tops of the Chillingham Hills include Titlington Pike, Dod Law and Doddington Northmoor. However, Ros Hill is significantly higher than these and towers over the surrounding landscape with easily enough relative height to make it a "Marilyn".

Ros Hill is situated just above Chillingham, with its famous herd of Chillingham cattle. Due to the wide enclosure of the cattle there are no paths on the western slopes, and the eastern slopes are featureless moor, so the best ascent option is to park at the summit of the minor road that crosses Hepburn Moor just to the south of the summit, giving a walk just over half a mile long and taking about half an hour.

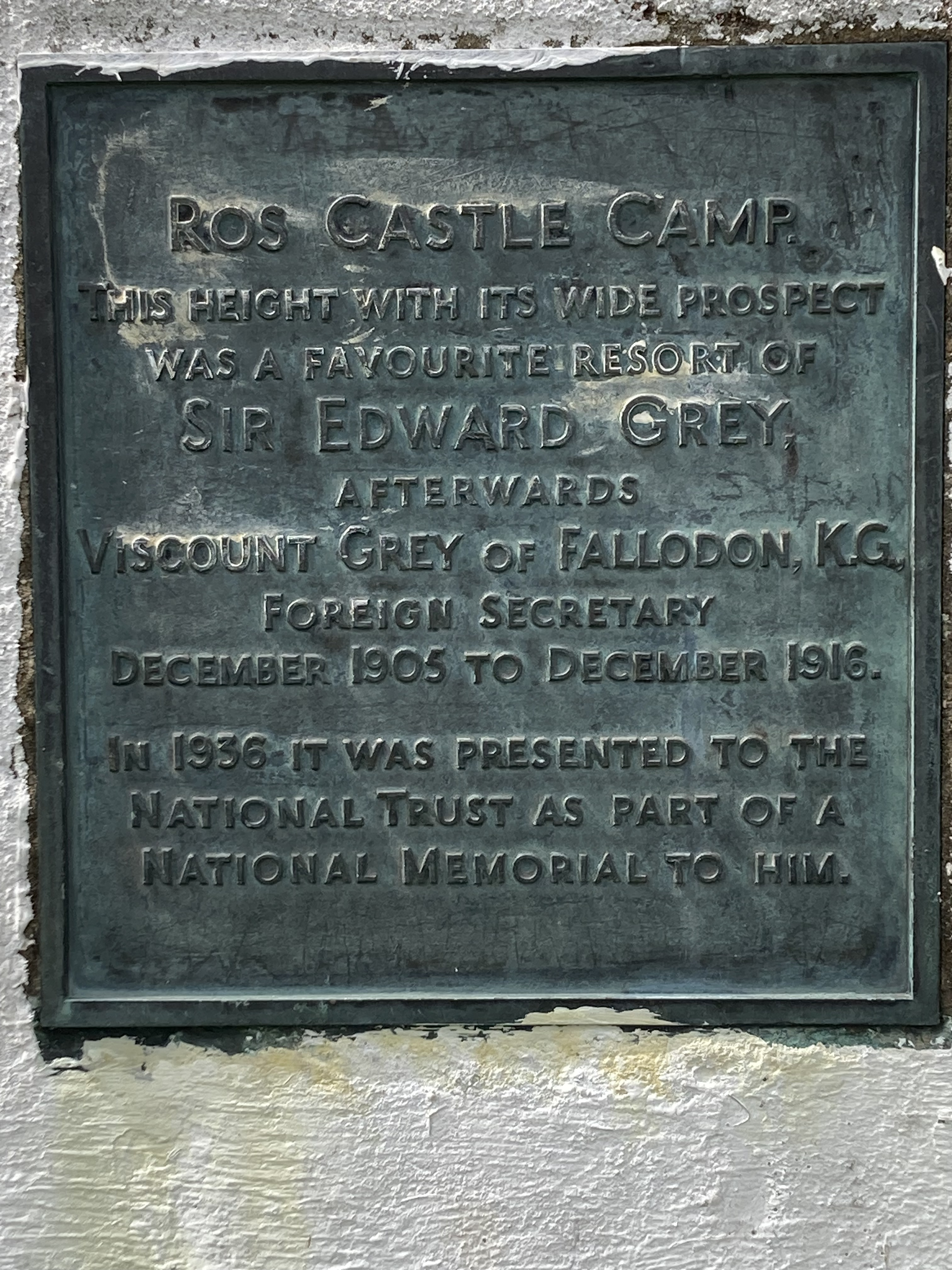
Bronze plaque on the triangulation pillar at Ros Castle

The summit is marked by a triangulation station and nearby there is a rather unusual walk-in toposcope built into the wall with four separate plaques. The view is panoramic and very extensive, and on a clear day, a total of seven castles can be seen from the summit, including the one on Holy Island. There is also a view over the cattle park to the north, while purple heather covers most of the surrounding area. This was a favourite location of Sir Edward Grey and after his death a part of the hill was acquired by public subscription and presented to the National Trust as part of a memorial to Grey. A plaque on the triangulation pillar records this.

== Etymology ==
Ros Hill preserves the Brittonic element "rhos", "moor, promontory".
