= Tosson Hill =

Hill in Northumberland, England

Coordinates: 55.27794°N 1.99367°W

Toss Hill
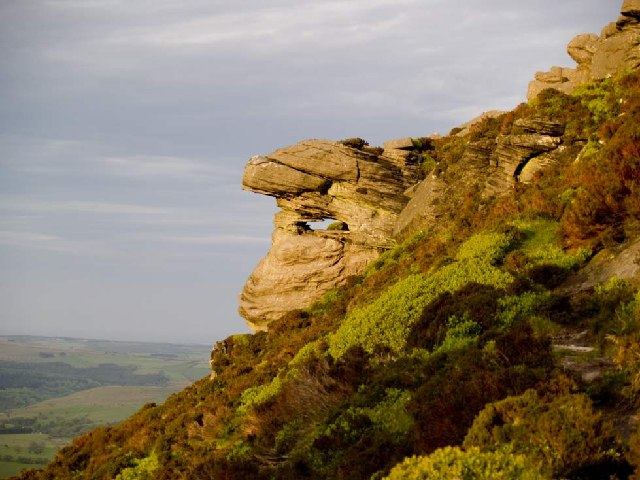
- Simonside Crag, on the eastern slopes

Highest point
- Elevation: 441.7 m (1,449 ft)
- Prominence: 249.1 m (817 ft)
- Parent peak: The Cheviot
- Listing: Marilyn

Geography
- Location: Simonside Hills, England
- OS grid: NZ005982
- Topo map: OS Landranger 81

Tosson Hill is the highest hill in the Simonside Hills to the south of Rothbury in Northumberland, England. The summit lies about 2 kilometres (1.2 mi) west of Simonside, the best-known summit of the Simonside Hills. It has an elevation of 441.7 m (1,449 ft) and a prominence of 249.1 m (817 ft) and is classed as a Marilyn.

The summit is about 1 kilometre (0.62 mi) west of the edge of the Forestry Commission-owned Simonside Forest, and unlike the rest of the Simonside hills there was no public access to the summit. This has now changed, as the area is 'access land' under the terms of the Countryside and Rights of Way Act 2000.

The sandstone crags at Ravensheugh on the northern side of Tosson Hill offer a variety of short rock climbing routes, and have been described as "A superb crag on top quality sandstone." They are usually less busy than crags within the Simonside Forest.
