= Cheviot Hills =

Upland between England and Scotland

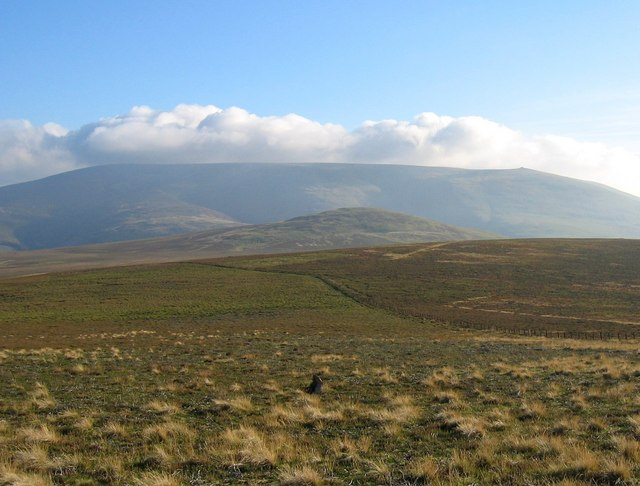
- The Cheviot and Coldburn Hill

Highest point
- Peak: The Cheviot
- Elevation: 815 m (2,674 ft)
- Coordinates: 55°28′41″N 2°09′07″W

Geography
- Location within Northumberland
- Location: Northumberland, England
- OS grid: NT905205

The Cheviot Hills or Cheviots are a range of uplands straddling the Anglo-Scottish border between Northumberland and the Scottish Borders. The English section is within the Northumberland National Park. The range includes The Cheviot (the highest hill), plus Hedgehope Hill to the east, Windy Gyle to the west, and Cushat Law and Bloodybush Edge to the south.

The hills are sometimes considered a part of the Southern Uplands of Scotland as they adjoin the uplands to the north. Since the Pennine Way runs through the region, the hills are also considered a part of the northern Pennines although they are separated from the Cheviot Hills by the Tyne Gap, part of which lies within the southern extent of the Northumberland National Park.

The Cheviot Hills are primarily associated with geological activity from approximately 480 to 360 million years ago, when the continents of Avalonia and Laurentia collided, resulting in extensive volcanic activity (the Caledonian orogeny) which created a granite outcrop surrounded by lava flows.

The area enjoys a general right to roam under both the English Countryside and Rights of Way Act 2000 and the Scottish Land Reform (Scotland) Act 2003.

The Southern Cheviots include the Otterburn Training Area, the UK's largest firing range, where the Ministry of Defence train up to 30,000 soldiers a year.

The area is the traditional home of the Cheviot sheep breed. It is also the home of Cheviot primitive feral goats, classified as a "Native Breed at Risk".

== Description ==
The Cheviot is the highest hill in the range, and in the whole of Northumberland, at 815 metres (2,674 ft). Other notable tops are Hedgehope Hill (714 metres (2,343 ft)), Windy Gyle (619 metres (2,031 ft)), Cushat Law (616 metres (2,021 ft)) and Bloodybush Edge (610 metres (2,000 ft)). Of the hills mentioned, only Windy Gyle has its summit on the border; the rest are all within England. The English section is protected within the Northumberland National Park.

Although many of the summits top 500 metres (1,600 ft), most have a relatively low prominence. Only three rise 150 metres (490 ft) or more above the surrounding terrain: The Cheviot itself, Shillhope Law and Housedon Hill, a small northern outlier (see Marilyn). To the southwest the Cheviots merge into the Kielder Forest group of hills.

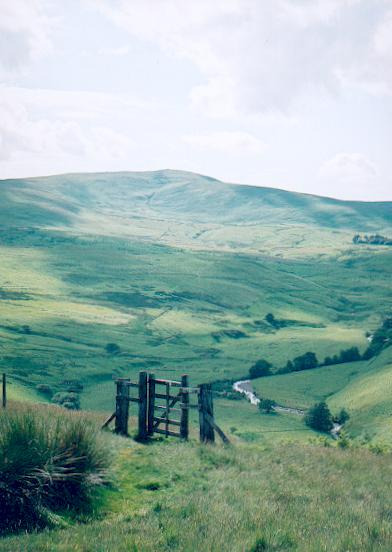
Hedgehope Hill and overlooking the Breamish Valley

There is a broad split between the northern and the southern Cheviots. The former encompass most of the high ground and are pierced by five main valleys:

- College Valley
- Harthope
- Breamish
- Bowmont
- Heatherhope valley

The southern Cheviot Hills encompass the slopes running down to the valley of the River Coquet while the northern Cheviot Hills end near the valley of the River Tweed.

== Geology ==
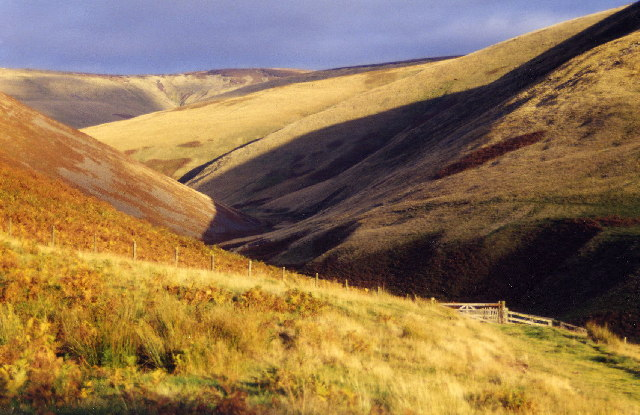
The Cheviot Burn

At the centre of the range is an outcrop of Early Devonian granite, the Cheviot Pluton, which is surrounded by Silurian and Devonian arc andesitic lava flows, tuffs and agglomerates of the Cheviot Volcanic Formation. These are in turn intruded by a swarm of igneous dykes with a predominantly calc-alkaline chemistry arranged radially around the pluton. Both the pluton and the volcanic rocks owe their origin to the northward subduction of the oceanic crust attached to the former micro-continent of Avalonia beneath the Laurentian plate in the course of the Caledonian orogeny during the Ordovician and Silurian periods.

The surrounding lower ground is formed from Carboniferous Limestone, though much of it is obscured by superficial deposits of Quaternary age.

== History ==
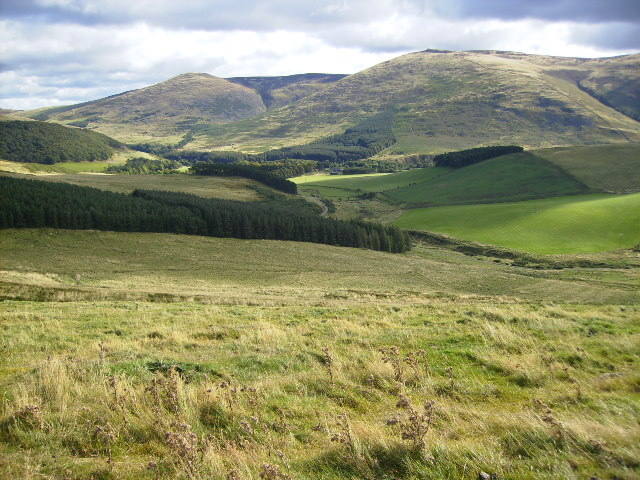
College Valley in the northern Cheviots, near Hethpool

The hills first appear in Middle English sources as doughter holmes; this is thought.

To the south of the Cheviot hills was the site of the Battle of Otterburn in 1388, and possibly a separate bloody battle between English and Scottish forces, after which only 110 people survived, which is described in "The Ballad of Chevy Chase". The origin of the border skirmishes between Percy, the Earl of Northumberland, and the Scottish Earl of Douglas may have been a hunt that strayed into Scotland and was interpreted as an invasion. Two other related battles were the Battle of Homildon Hill, fought within the Cheviots near Wooler in 1402, and the Battle of Hedgeley Moor, fought north of Powburn in 1464.

== Access ==
Most of the range on the English side is mapped as 'open country' and hence there is a general right to roam over it as prescribed in the Countryside and Rights of Way Act 2000. Traditional rights of access in Scotland, bolstered by the Land Reform (Scotland) Act 2003, provide for similar access for the public to the north of the border. In addition, a sparse network of public bridleways and footpaths stretches around the area, often providing useful means of access from the lower ground onto the open hills.

The northernmost leg of the Pennine Way runs from Byrness in England to Kirk Yetholm in Scotland. It is the longest, and most exposed, on the whole of the national trail. The Way follows the high level Border Ridge (literally the England–Scotland boundary fence) for nearly 32 kilometres (20 mi) after the ascent to the ridge from Byrness. The terrain is boggy and remote, and two mountain refuge huts are situated on the Way for those too tired or weather-beaten to continue.

The town of Wooler in the Cheviot Fringe (the lowlands bordering the hills to the east) is often cited as the "Gateway to the Cheviots" as it is the largest town in the Cheviot region; the town also has easy access being on the major A697 road.

Many walking routes have been established, such as:

- Breamish Valley Hillfort Trail
- Three Forts Foray, a 5.5 mile walk that takes roughly 3.5 hours to complete. The walking difficulty has been graded as moderate.
- Humbleton Hillfort
- Ring Chesters Round
- Hethas Hike
- Hethpool to the Curr, a 11.5 mile walk that takes roughly 7 hours to complete. Graded as strenuous.
- Barrowburn Family Walk
- Harthope Valley Walk
- Yeavering Bell Walk
- Hethpool Wild Goat Walk
- Linhope Spout Walk
- Hethpool Linn and Yeavering Bell Walk
- Kirknewton Hillfort Trail
- Dunsdale to West Hill
- College Valley Walk
- The Shepherds Cairn Walk
- Reaveley Farn Family Stroll.

== Otterburn Army Training Estate ==
The Otterburn Army Training Estate (ATE) covers about 230 square kilometres (90 sq mi) of the Southern Cheviots, approximately 23% of the Northumberland National Park. It is owned by the Ministry of Defence (MoD), and used for training some 30,000 soldiers a year. Otterburn is the UK's largest firing range, and is in frequent use — artillery can be clearly heard from Lindisfarne to the north-east and Fontburn Reservoir in the south. Because of this, recreational use of the area is restricted, although it is possible for the public to use some parts of the estate subject to the relevant bylaws. The MoD publishes a booklet, Walks on Ministry of Defence Lands, which offers advice on this matter (see link below).

== Peaks over 500 metres in the Cheviot Hills ==
The peaks marked with a warning sign lie within the danger area of the ATE Otterburn artillery range.

Name	Height (m)	Height (ft)	OS Grid reference	Coordinates
The Cheviot	815	2,674	NT909205	55°28′40″N 2°08′35″W
Cairn Hill	777	2,549	NT903195	55°28′10″N 2°09′10″W
Hedgehope Hill	714	2,343	NT944197	55°28′15″N 2°05′20″W
Comb Fell (peak to the east of the Fell)	652	2,139	NT924187	55°27′40″N 2°07′10″W
Windy Gyle	619	2,031	NT855153	55°25′50″N 2°13′45″W
Cushat Law	615	2,018	NT927137	55°25′00″N 2°06′50″W
Bloodybush Edge	610	2,001	NT903144	55°25′20″N 2°09′10″W
The Schil	601	1,972	NT869223	55°29′45″N 2°12′30″W
peak SSW of Catcleuch Shin	579	1,900	NT682052	55°20′20″N 2°30′00″W
Dunmoor Hill	569	1,867	NT967187	55°27′30″N 2°03′00″W
The Curr	564	1,850	NT850233	55°30′15″N 2°14′10″W
Wholhope Hill	563	1,847	NT941117	55°23′50″N 2°05′40″W
Beefstand Hill	562	1,844	NT821143	55°25′20″N 2°16′55″W
Thirl Moor	558	1,831	NT806083	55°22′10″N 2°18′20″W
Mozie Law	552	1,811	NT828150	55°25′45″N 2°16′10″W
Carlin Tooth	551	1,808	NT631024	55°18′55″N 2°34′50″W
Limestone Knowe	551	1,808	NT672018	55°18′30″N 2°31′00″W
Hartshorn Pike	549	1,801	NT627017	55°18′30″N 2°35′10″W
Black Hag	549	1,801	NT861237	55°30′25″N 2°13′05″W
Scald Hill	549	1,801	NT927218	55°29′20″N 2°07′00″W
Carter Fell	547	1,795	NT672035	55°19′25″N 2°31′00″W
Yarnspath Law	543	1,781	NT884133	55°24′45″N 2°11′00″W
Newton Tors: summit	537	1,762	NT908269	55°32′10″N 2°08′38″W
peak at Girdle Fell near White Crags	536	1,759	NT697017	55°18′35″N 2°28′40″W
King's Seat	531	1,742	NT879173	55°27′00″N 2°11′30″W
Shill Moor	528	1,732	NT944153	55°25′50″N 2°05′15″W
Scotts' Law	528	1,732	NT868241	55°30′30″N 2°12′35″W
Ravens Knowe	527	1,729	NT780062	55°21′00″N 2°20′45″W
Peak near Harden Edge	527	1,729	NT786073	55°21′30″N 2°20′20″W
Preston Hill	526	1,726	NT923238	55°30′25″N 2°07′20″W
Scrathy Holes	521	1,709	NT638031	55°19′15″N 2°34′10″W
Newton Tors: Wester Tor	518	1,699	NT907273	55°32′50″N 2°08′40″W
Newton Tors: Hare Law	518	1,699	NT902265	55°31′50″N 2°09′00″W
Broadhope Hill	517	1,696	NT933234	55°30′15″N 2°06′20″W
Grey Mares Knowe	516	1,693	NT666003	55°17′40″N 2°31′30″W
Ogre Hill	516	1,693	NT777069	55°21′20″N 2°21′10″W
Lamb Hill	511	1,677	NT811133	55°24′45″N 2°18′00″W
Outer Golden Pot	505	1,657	NT802072	55°21′30″N 2°18′45″W
Shillhope Law	501	1,644	NT873097	55°22′50″N 2°12′00″W
