= The Cheviot =

Highest summit in the Cheviot Hills, England

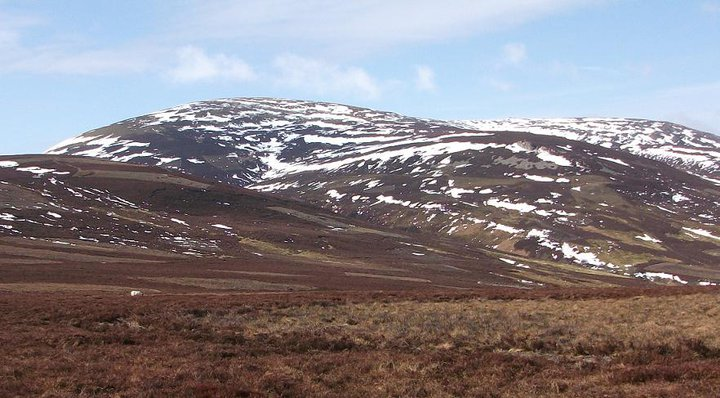
- The Cheviot in snow

Highest point
- Elevation: 815 m (2,674 ft)
- Prominence: 556 m (1,824 ft)
- Parent peak: Broad Law
- Listing: Marilyn, Hewitt, County Top, Nuttall
- Coordinates: 55°28′42″N 2°08′44″W

Naming
- English translation: (Hill) having the quality of a ridge
- Language of name: Common Brittonic

Geography
- Location within Northumberland
- Location: Cheviot Hills, England
- OS grid: NT909205
- Topo map: OS Landranger 74/75

Geology
- Rock age: Early Devonian
- Mountain type: Stratovolcano (extinct) with pluton
- Last eruption: +393 MYA

The Cheviot (/ˈtʃiːviət/) is an extinct volcano and the highest summit in the Cheviot Hills and in the county of Northumberland. Located in the extreme north of England, it is a 1 1/4-mile (2-kilometre) walk from the Scottish border and, with a height of 2,674 feet (815 metres) above sea-level, is located on the northernmost few miles of the Pennine Way, before the descent into Kirk Yetholm.

The Cheviot was formed when melting in the crust over 390 million years ago gave rise to volcanic activity, producing a stratovolcano and pluton, and it has subsequently sustained intense erosion. Several watercourses radiate from The Cheviot.

== Etymology ==
The name Cheviot, which was first documented in 1181 as Chiuiet, is probably of Brittonic origin. The name involves the element *ceμ-, (Note: The Greek letter mu ⟨μ⟩ is used in studies of the Brittonic languages to refer to the lenited form of the *m sound; *ceμ would be pronounced something like [kɛṽ] or [kɛβ̃].) meaning "ridge", and the nominal suffix -ed, which in place-names can mean "having the quality of" (cf. Chevet, Yorks.). The final syllable may have been influenced by Old English ġeat ("gate") The inclusion of the definite article in its name is optional, with some hillwalkers simply referring to the mountain as 'Cheviot'.

== Geography ==
At 2,674 feet (815 metres) above sea-level, The Cheviot is the highest point in the Cheviot Hills, the county top of Northumberland, England's highest point outside of Cumbria and fourth-highest outside the Lake District, after Cross Fell, Great Dun Fell and Little Dun Fell. Assuming that summits on the border are classed as both Scottish and English, if prominence criteria are disregarded, its subsidiary summit, Cairn Hill West Top, or Hangingstone Hill, is the most easterly mountain in Scotland.

It is located in the Northumberland National Park and is 41 miles (66 kilometres) from the city of Newcastle-upon-Tyne. It can be viewed in the distance from the peak of Cow Hill on the Town Moor, the city's largest park. The mountain can also be viewed from most areas of Northumberland and from as far south as central County Durham. The Cheviot's summit boasts views of many upland areas such as the Lake District, including Scafell Pike (England's highest mountain) over 80 miles to the south-west, the North Pennines and the North York Moors in Northern England, as well as several in Scotland including the Ettrick Hills, the Pentlands and even the southern peaks of the Grampians and the Mounth. The summit is a triangular plateau covered with peat quagmires.

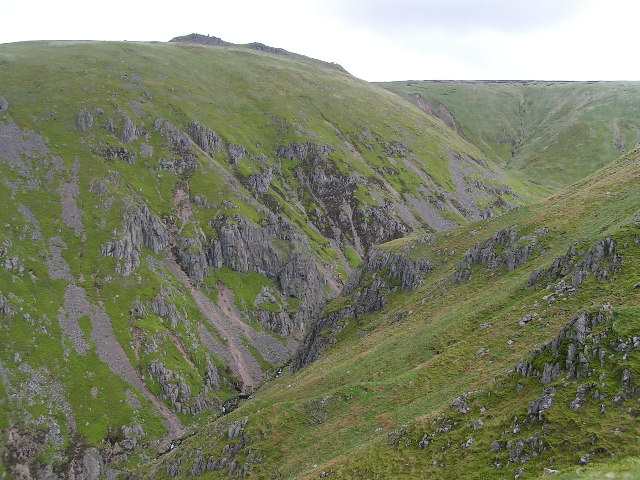
Hen Hole, a gorge that marks the start of the College valley on the Cheviot.

Usway Burn, a tributary of the Coquet, rises on The Cheviot, as does College Burn, which flows across a series of cascades (including the Three Sisters Waterfall) though a gorge known as Hen Hole on the western flank of the mountain and merges with the Bowmont Water to form the River Glen near Kirk Newton. Harthope Burn also has its source at the Cheviot.

== Geology ==
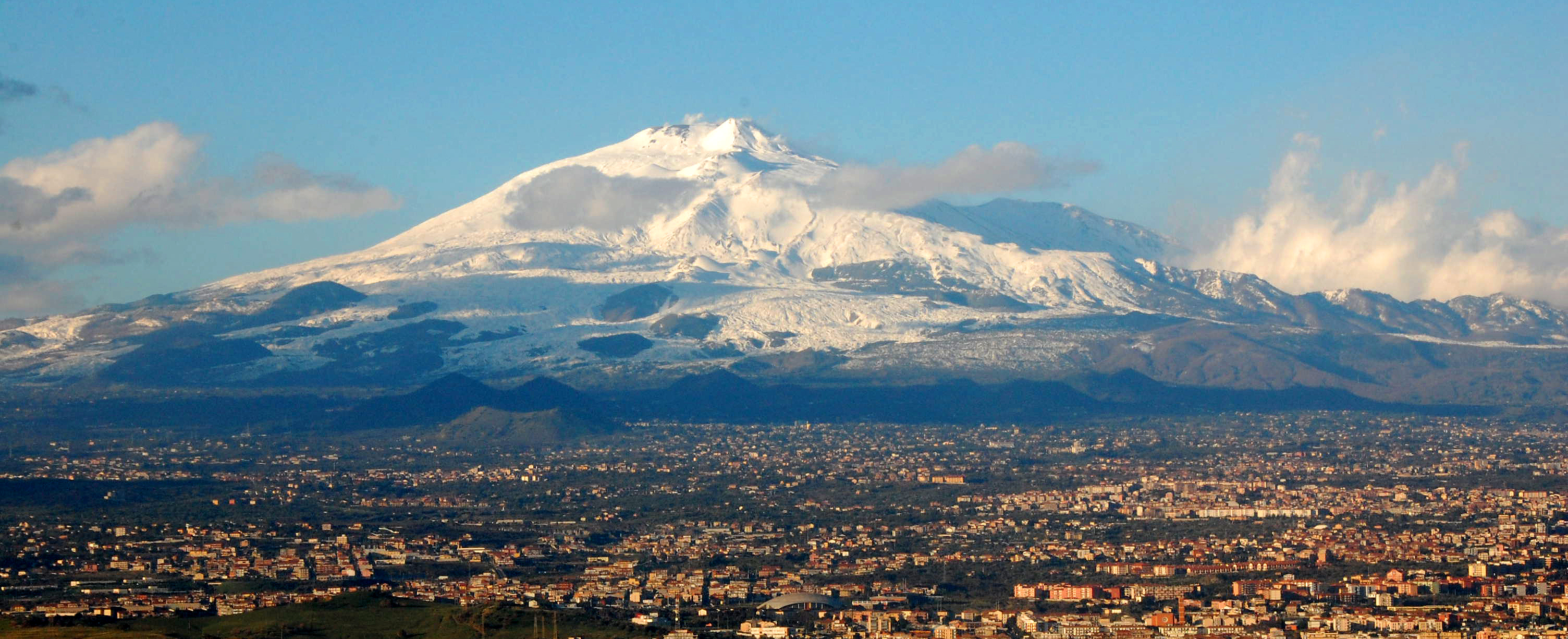
During the geological era in which it was active, The Cheviot volcano may have been similar in size to Mount Etna on Sicily (pictured).

The Cheviot is an extinct stratovolcano eruptive during the Caledonian orogeny (490–390 Ma), in which volcanic activity arose from melting within the mantle crust. The mountain is heavily eroded, and originally may have been as high as 10,000 ft (3,000 m), with a diameter perhaps of 37 miles (60 km). Volcanic vents may have been located along the faults at Harthope and Thirl Moor. The earliest volcanic activity in the area was violent and explosive, with exposed ash and ignimbrite showing pyroclastic flows to have reached Coquetdale and Ingram. Later activity consisted of andesitic, trachyte and rhyolitic lava extrusion, which abnormally for such lavas, covered an area as large as 230 sq mi (600 km^{2}). Lavas erupted from the Cheviot form the rocks that underlie Branxton and Flodden Ridge.

Granitic magma was intruded into the layers of lava during the time period immediately before the volcano became inactive. The resulting 19 sq mi (50 km^{2}) pluton was exposed by erosion during the Carboniferous (+298 Ma).

Glacial till is common in the area, which is a remnant of the Last Ice Age (< 115 Ka), during which the Cheviots were beneath ice sheets. The peat expanses date from the immediately post-glacial period.

== Human history ==
Flattened remnants of a Neolithic henge monument have been uncovered at nearby Hethpool. The stone circle may date to around 2500 BC, and is hypothesized to have been a ritualistic gateway to the mountain.

Harthope Burn, which cuts a deep valley on the flanks of The Cheviot, marked the boundary between the reivers of the English East and Middle Marches in the 16th and 17th century.

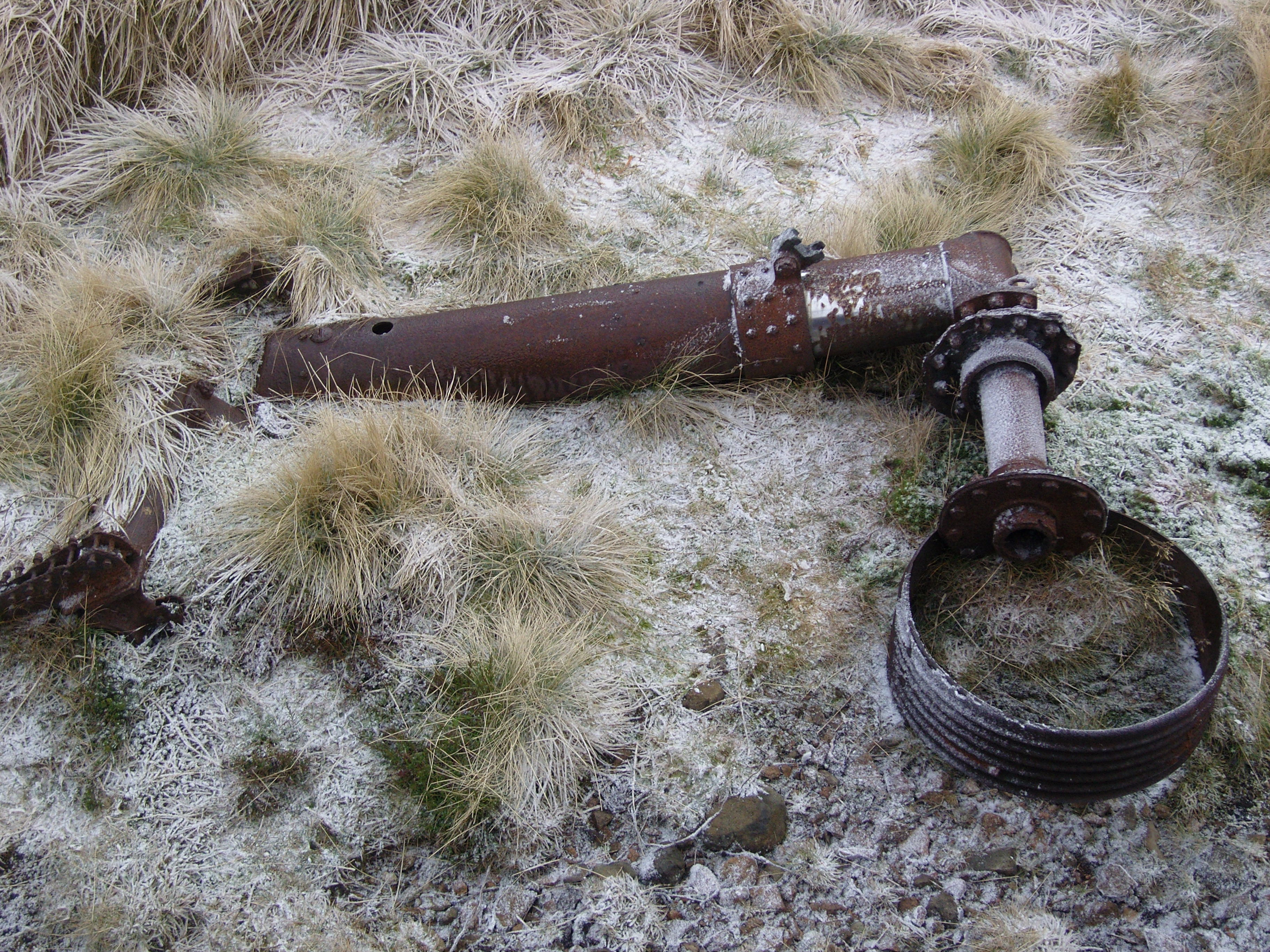
The landing gear of a B-17 bomber that crashed in World War II

During World War II, The Cheviot and the hills surrounding it were the site of aircraft crashes which claimed the lives both of Allied and German airmen. A local shepherd John Dagg and his sheepdog rescued a pilot following an RAF crash in 1942. Dagg also rescued survivors of a crash in December 1944, which killed 2 members of a 9-man US Air Force crew. Aircraft wreckage is still seen on the mountain today.

== Access ==
Other than the route via the Pennine Way, most routes up the Cheviot start from the Harthope Burn side to the northeast, which provides the nearest access by road. The summit is around 3 mi (5 km) from the road-end at Langleeford; across the valley to the east is the rounded peak of Hedgehope. There are routes following the ridges above either side of the valley, and a route that sticks to the valley floor until it climbs to the summit of the Cheviot from the head of the valley.

Although the Pennine Way does a 2 mi (3 km) out-and-back detour to the Cheviot, many walkers who come this way omit it, since the stage (the most northerly) is 29 mi (47 km) long.

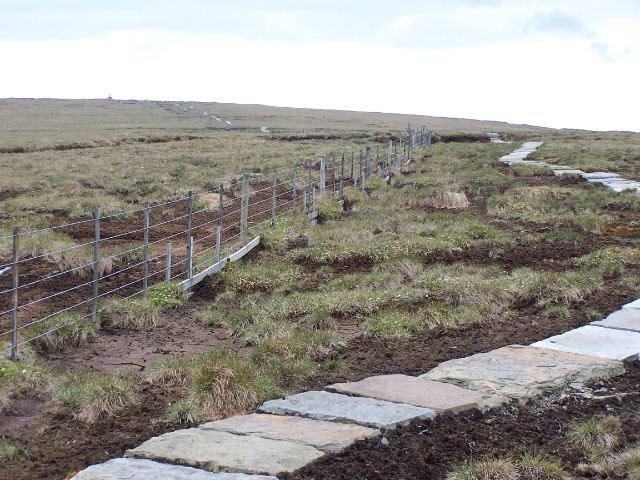
The Pennine Way approaching the summit of The Cheviot on the flag stone path

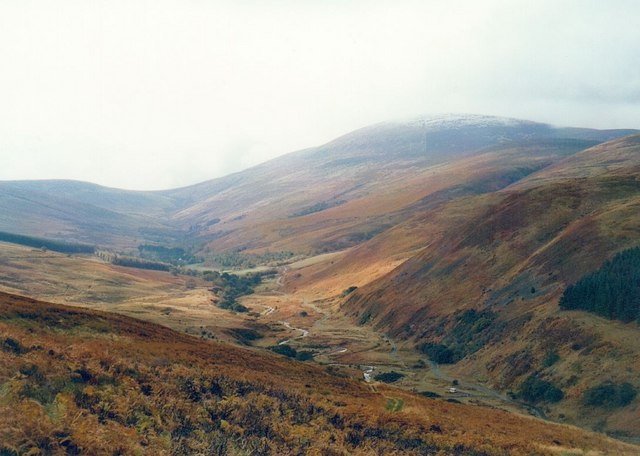
The Cheviot and the Harthope Valley

== View ==
The view is obscured greatly by the flatness of the summit plateau. Nevertheless, on a clear day the following are visible (from west, clockwise); Broad Law, Moorfoot Hills, Pentland Hills, the Ochils, Lammermuir Hills, Ros Hill, Long Crag, Urra Moor, Tosson Hill, Burnhope Seat, Cross Fell, Helvellyn, Scafell Pike, Skiddaw, Sighty Crag, Peel Fell, and Queensberry. The longest possible line of sight from the Cheviot is to Beinn a' Ghlò, 112 miles (180 kilometres) away in the Grampians of the Scottish Highlands.

== Subsidiary SMC summits ==
Summit	Height (m)	Listing
Cairn Hill West Top [Hangingstone Hill]	743	DT,CoH,Bg,xN
