= Anglo-Scandinavian =

Cultural phase described by historians

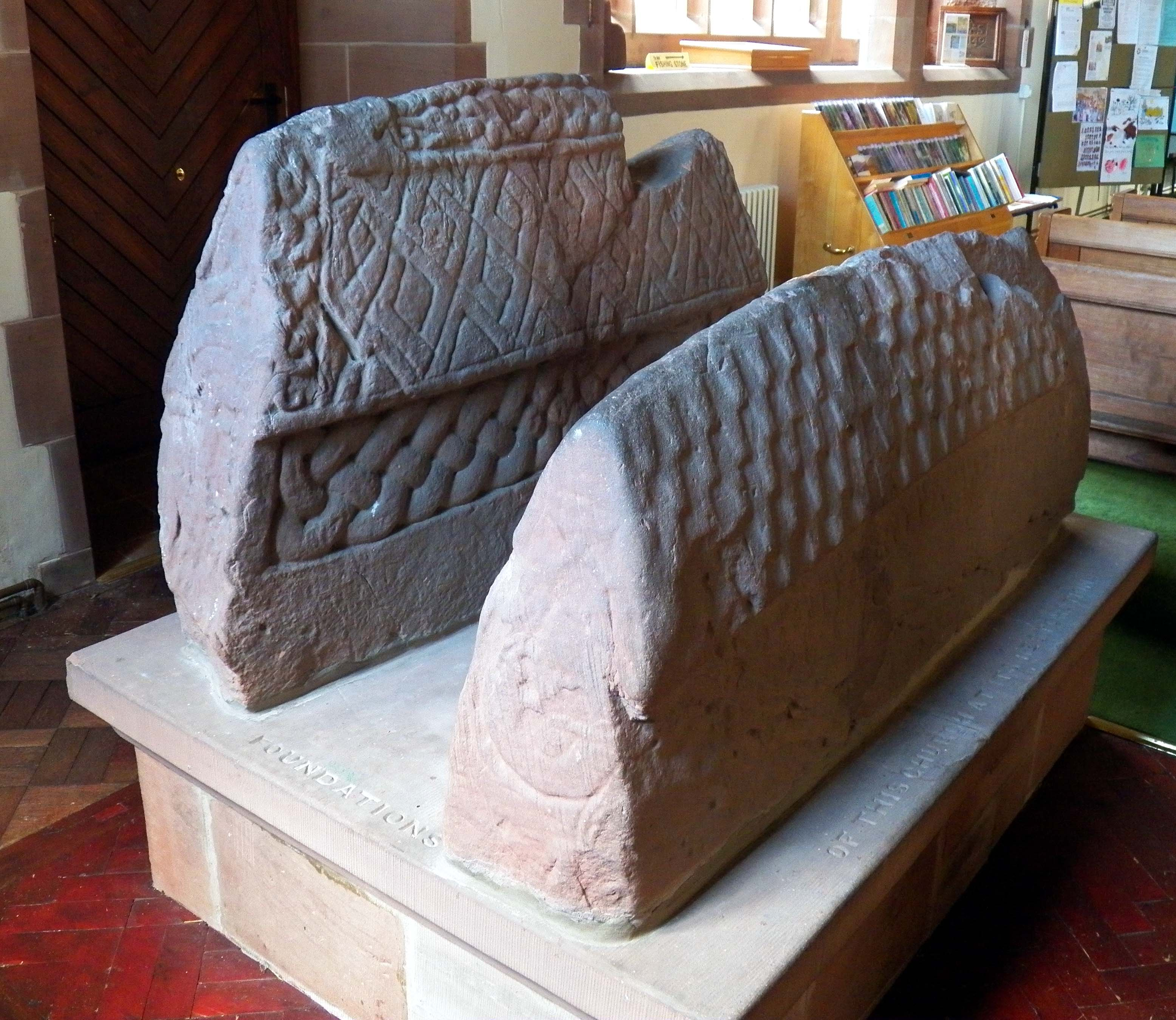
Hogbacks in St Mary's Church, Gosforth, Cumbria

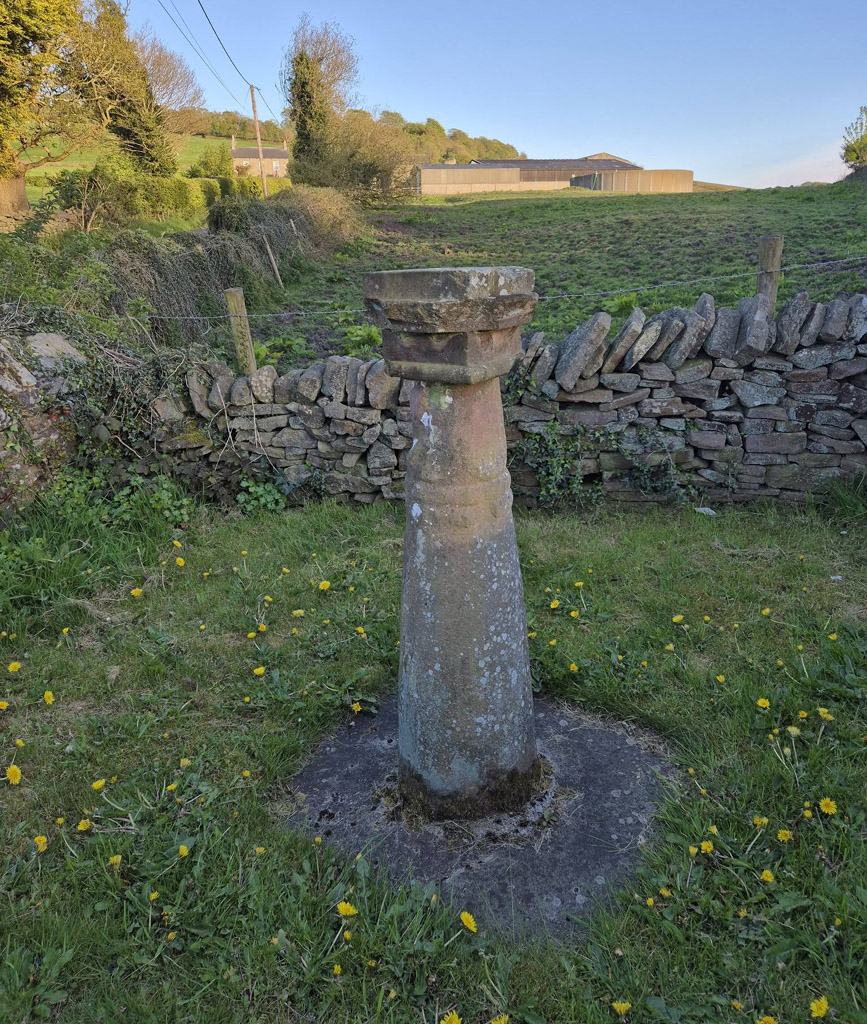
Shall Cross, one of 30 similar Anglo Scandinavian crosses in the Staffordshire, Derbyshire, Cheshire region.

Anglo-Scandinavian is an academic term referring to the hybridisation between Norse and Anglo-Saxon cultures in Britain during the early medieval period. It remains a term and concept often used by historians and archaeologists, and in linguistic spheres.

Although evidence for interconnection between Scandinavia and England is present throughout the entire early medieval period, two major concentrations of Scandinavian settlement are evident: the creation of the Danelaw during the mid-ninth century, and the conquest of Sweyn Forkbeard and Cnut in the 1010s.

== Origins ==
Contact between the Norse and Anglo-Saxons began with the Viking invasions of England. The first recorded encounter between the two cultures took place in 789 CE at the Isle of Portland in Wessex. The Anglo-Saxon Chronicle describes a group of Viking ships from Hordaland (in present Norway) landing at the harbor before being confronted by the local reeve, Beaduheard. Shortly after, the Norsemen killed Beaduheard and his soldiers. Four years later, a more devastating force of Viking ships pillaged the monastery of Lindisfarne in Northumbria, an unguarded commune with plenty of valuable relics. This event caused a significant impact on England's perceived safety and began a tumultuous relationship between the resident Anglo-Saxons and settling Scandinavians.

== Archaeology ==
There are a number of artefact types that appear only within Scandinavian-occupied England, and thus appear to be exclusively 'Anglo-Scandinavian'. Norse bells, like the examples found at Cottam B, are found nowhere in Scandinavia and only within Norse colonies. The hogback form of stone grave markers is unattested in the rest of the Scandinavian world. An argument for hybridity has also been constructed from the varying range of burial practices evident within the Danelaw, rather than the more standardised diagnostic patterns of burial we see in Scandinavia: Richards has suggested that 'rather than searching for burial-types that can be matched in Scandinavia we should therefore be looking for the creation of new cultural identities'

== Linguistics ==
Lewis-Simpson has advanced the argument that Danelaw personal names are a direct reflection of this process of hybridity.

== See also ==
- Scandinavian York
