= North Pennine Moors SAC =

Special Area of Conservation in northern England

North Pennine Moors SAC is a Special Area of Conservation located across parts of Northumberland, North Yorkshire, County Durham, and Cumbria. The total area is approximately 400 sq mi (100,000 ha). (Note: The designation document gives the total area as 103,109.42 ha (398.1077 sq mi). The sum of the areas of the component SSSIs given in their respective designation documents is 108,405.985 ha (418.55785 sq mi)) It forms part of the North Pennines National Character Area. It has ten qualifying habitats, for example H4010 Northern Atlantic wet heaths with Erica tetralix, H4030 European dry heaths and H7130 Blanket bog, and one qualifying species S1528 Marsh saxifrage, Saxifraga hirculus.

The SAC is made up of 14 Sites of Special Scientific Interest.

SSSIs within North Pennine Moors SAC
Name of SSSI	County	OS gridref	Area (ha)	Ref
Allendale Moors	Northumberland	NY 808 485	5289.099	
Arkengarthdale Gunnerside and Reeth Moors	North Yorkshire	NY 952 025	7634.588	
Bollihope, Pikestone, Eggleston and Woodland Fells	County Durham	NZ 011 313	7947.095	
Bowes Moor	County Durham	NY 926 109	4489.892	
Cotherstone Moor	County Durham	NY 928 170	2449.625	
East Nidderdale Moors (Flamstone Pin - High Ruckles)	North Yorkshire	SE 140 763	10770.89	
Geltsdale & Glendue Fells	Cumbria/Northumberland	NY 612 545	8059.048	
Hexhamshire Moors	County Durham	NY 884 517	9436.916	
Lovely Seat - Stainton Moor	North Yorkshire	SD 983 946	10132.51	
Lune Forest	County Durham	NY 869 214	6329.252	
Mallerstang-Swaledale Head	Cumbria/North Yorkshire	NY 834 008	6234.75	
Muggleswick, Stanhope and Edmundbyers Commons and Blanchland Moor	County Durham/Northumberland	NY 986 464	9120.005	
West Nidderdale, Barden and Blubberhouses Moors	North Yorkshire	SE 088 603	13421.85	
Whitfield Moor, Plenmeller and Asholme Commons	Northumberland	NY 730 565	7090.465	
