= Viking activity in the British Isles =

Aspect of Viking expansion

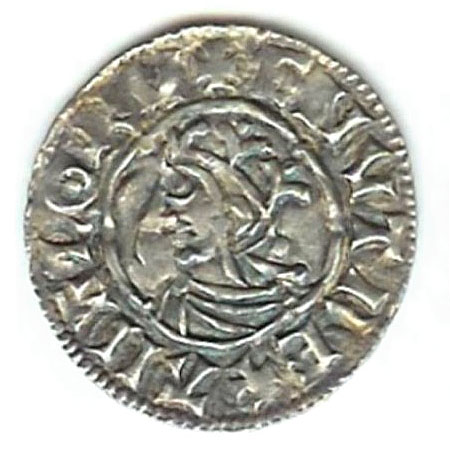
Coin of King Cnut.

Viking activity in the British Isles occurred during the Early Middle Ages, the 8th to the 11th centuries CE, when Scandinavians travelled to the British Isles to raid, conquer, settle and trade. They are generally referred to as Vikings, but some scholars debate whether the term Viking (Note: The word Viking is a historical revival; it was not used in Middle English, but it was revived from Old Norse vikingr "freebooter, sea-rover, pirate, Viking", which usually is explained as meaning properly "one who came from the fjords" from vik "creek, inlet, small bay" (cf. Old English wic, Middle High German wich "bay", and the second element in Reykjavik). But Old English wicing and Old Frisian wizing are almost 300 years older, and probably derive from wic "village, camp" (temporary camps were a feature of the Viking raids), related to Latin vicus "village, habitation".) represented all Scandinavian settlers or just those who used violence. (Note: Graham-Campbell and Batey suggest that "true Vikings [are] those who took part in Viking raids [...]. A Viking base, is thus a base from which Vikings went raiding, but a Norse settlement in Scotland is a settlement occupied by people of Scandinavian origin".)

At the start of the early medieval period, Scandinavian kingdoms had developed trade links reaching as far as southern Europe and the Mediterranean, giving them access to foreign imports, such as silver, gold, bronze, and spices. These trade links also extended westwards into Ireland and Britain.

In the last decade of the eighth century, Viking raiders sacked several Christian monasteries in northern Britain, and over the next three centuries they launched increasingly large scale invasions and settled in many areas, especially in eastern Britain and Ireland, the islands north and west of Scotland and the Isle of Man.

== Background of local ethnic groups ==
During the early medieval period, the islands of Ireland and Britain were each culturally, linguistically, and religiously divided among various peoples.

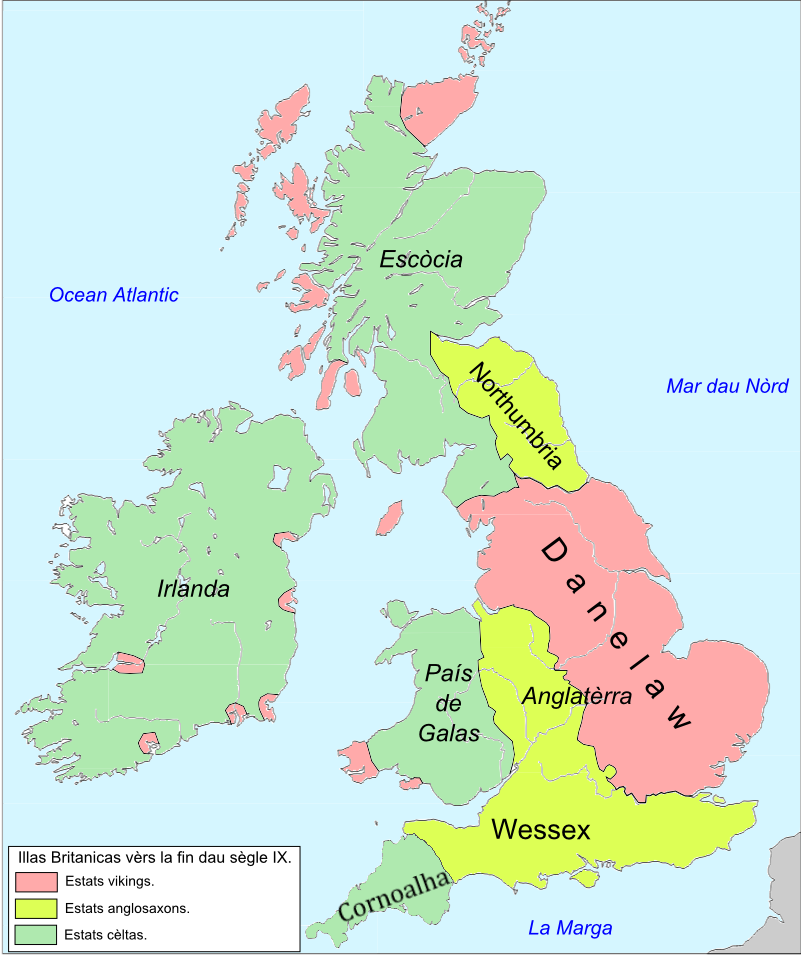
Territories controlled by the Vikings (red), Anglo-Saxons (yellow) and Celts (green) in the 9th century

=== Language and religion ===
The languages of the Celtic Britons and of the Gaels descended from the Celtic languages spoken by Iron Age inhabitants of Europe. In Ireland and parts of western Scotland, as well as in the Isle of Man, people spoke an early form of Celtic Gaelic known as Old Irish. In Cornwall, Cumbria, Wales, and south-west Scotland, the Celtic Brythonic languages were spoken (their modern descendants include Welsh and Cornish).

The Picts, who spoke the Pictish language, lived in the area north of the Forth and Clyde rivers, which now constitutes a large portion of modern-day Scotland. Due to the scarcity of writing in Pictish, which survives only in Ogham, views differ as to whether Pictish was a Celtic language like those spoken further south, or perhaps even a non-Indo-European language like Basque. However, most inscriptions and place-names hint towards the Picts being Celtic in language and culture.

Much of southern Britain had become the various kingdoms of Anglo-Saxon England, where Anglo-Saxon migrants from continental Europe had settled during the fifth century, bringing with them their own Germanic language (known as Old English), polytheistic religion and cultural practices.

Many peoples of Britain and Ireland had already converted to Christianity from their older, pre-Christian polytheistic religions, including the distinct polytheistic religion (Anglo-Saxon paganism) practiced by the Anglo-Saxons.

=== Distribution of ethnic groups ===
In northern Britain, in the area roughly corresponding to modern-day Scotland, lived three distinct ethnic groups in their own respective kingdoms: the Picts, Scots, and Britons. The Pictish cultural group dominated the majority of Scotland, with major populations concentrated between the Firth of Forth and the River Dee, as well as in Sutherland, Caithness, and Orkney. The Scots, according to written sources, constituted a tribal group which had crossed to Britain from Dalriada in the north of Ireland during the late-fifth century. The northern Britons lived in the Old North, in parts of what have become southern Scotland and northern England, and, by the seventh or eighth centuries, these had apparently come under the political control of Anglo-Saxons.

By the mid-ninth century, Anglo-Saxon England comprised four separate and independent kingdoms: East Anglia, Wessex, Northumbria, and Mercia, the last of which was the strongest military power.

=== Class system ===
Between half a million and a million people lived in England at this time, with society being rigidly hierarchical. The class system had a king and his ealdormen at the top, under whom ranked the thegns (or landholders), and then the various categories of agricultural workers below them. Beneath all of these was a class of slaves, who may have made up as much as a quarter of the population.

The majority of the populace lived in the countryside, although a few large towns had developed, notably London and York, which became centres of royal and ecclesiastical administration. There were also a number of trading ports, such as Hamwic and Ipswich, which engaged in foreign trade.

== Viking raids: 780s–850 ==
Viking raids began in England in the late 8th century, primarily on monasteries. These monasteries had often been positioned on small islands and in other remote coastal areas so that the monks could live in seclusion, devoting themselves to worship without the interference of other elements of society. At the same time, it made them isolated and unprotected targets for attack by sea.

The first recorded raid was on the south coast, at Portland, Dorset in 789; the Anglo-Saxon Chronicle described the Vikings as heathen men. The first monastery to be raided was at Lindisfarne in 793, off the northeast coast of England. Monasteries and minster churches were popular targets as they were wealthy and had valuable objects that were portable. The Anglo-Saxon Chronicle for the year 840 says that Æthelwulf of Wessex was defeated at Carhampton, Somerset, after 35 Viking ships had landed in the area.

The first known account of a Viking raid of the Viking Era comes from 789, when three ships from Hordaland (in modern Norway) landed in the Isle of Portland on the southern coast of Wessex. When approached by Beaduheard, the royal reeve from Dorchester, whose job it was to identify all foreign merchants entering the kingdom, they killed him. There were almost certainly unrecorded earlier raids. In a document dating to 792, King Offa of Mercia set out privileges granted to monasteries and churches in Kent, but he excluded military service "against seaborne pirates with migrating fleets", showing that Viking raids were already an established problem. In a letter of 790–92 to King Æthelred I of Northumbria, Alcuin berated English people for copying the fashions of pagans who menaced them with terror. This shows that there were already close contacts between the two peoples, and the Vikings would have been well informed about their targets.

The next recorded attack against the Anglo-Saxons came the following year, in 793, when the monastery at Lindisfarne, an island just off the northeast coast of England, was sacked by a Viking raiding party on 8 June.

Lo, it is nearly 350 years that we and our fathers have inhabited this most lovely land, and never before has such a terror appeared as we have now suffered from a pagan race, nor was it thought that such an inroad from the sea could be made. Behold the church of St Cuthbert spattered with the blood of the priests of God, despoiled of all its ornaments.

— Archbishop Alcuin of York on the sacking of Lindisfarne.

The following year, they sacked the nearby Monkwearmouth–Jarrow Abbey. The Vikings met with stronger resistance than they had expected: their leaders were killed. The raiders escaped, only to have their ships beached at Tynemouth and the crews killed by locals. This represented one of the last raids on England for about 40 years. The Vikings focused instead on Ireland and Scotland.

In 795, they once again attacked, this time raiding Iona Abbey off Scotland's west coast. This monastery was attacked again in 802 and 806, when 68 people living there were killed. After this devastation, the monastic community at Iona abandoned the site and fled to Kells in Ireland. In the first decade of the ninth century, Viking raiders began to attack coastal districts of Ireland. In 835, the first major Viking raid in southern England took place and was directed against the Isle of Sheppey and in a battle in 839, Vikings inflicted heavy defeats against the Picts, killing Uuen, the King of the Picts, his brother Bran and Aed son of Boanta, King of Dál Riata.

According to Norse Sagas, in 865 the legendary Viking chief Ragnar Lodbrok fell into the hands of King Ælla of Northumbria. Ælla allegedly had Ragnar thrown into a snake pit. It is said that Ragnar's enraged sons, taking advantage of political instability in England, recruited the Great Heathen Army, which landed in the Kingdom of East Anglia that year. There is no proof that this legend has any basis in history; however, it is known that several of the Viking leaders grouped their bands together to form one great army that landed in the kingdom of East Anglia to start their attempted conquest of England in 866.

In 867 the great army went north and captured York, but Ælla, together with support from the other English kingdoms, attempted to retake the city. He was unsuccessful; the annals for the year says that Ælla was killed during the battle, but according to legend he was captured by the Vikings, who executed or 'blood eagled' him as punishment for Ragnar's murder.

=== England runestones ===
Map of the geographic distribution of the England Runestones in southern Scandinavia and northernmost Germany (modern administrative borders and cities are shown)

The England runestones (Swedish: Englandsstenarna) is a group of about 30 runestones in Sweden which refer to Viking Age voyages to England. They constitute one of the largest groups of runestones that mention voyages to other countries, and they are comparable in number only to the approximately 30 Greece runestones and the 26 Ingvar runestones, of which the latter refer to a Viking expedition to the Middle East. They were engraved in Old Norse with the Younger Futhark.

The Anglo-Saxon rulers paid large sums, Danegelds, to Vikings, who mostly came from Denmark and Sweden, arriving to the English shores during the 990s and the first decades of the 11th century. Some runestones relate of these Danegelds, such as the Yttergärde runestone, U 344, which tells of Ulf of Borresta who received the danegeld three times, and the last one he received from Canute the Great. Canute sent home most of the Vikings who had helped him conquer England, but he kept a strong bodyguard, the Þingalið, and its members are also mentioned on several runestones.

The vast majority of the runestones, 27, were raised Sweden and 17 of those located around lake Mälaren on the east coast. Denmark in its present-day borders has no such runestones, but there is a runestone in Scania which mentions London. There are also single cases of such runestones, located in Norway and in Schleswig (Germany).

Some Vikings, such as Guðvér, did not only attack England, but also Saxony, as reported by the Grinda Runestone Sö 166 in Södermanland:

Grjótgarðr (and) Einriði, the sons
made (the stone) in memory of (their) able father.
Guðvér was in the west;
divided (up) payment in England;
manfully attacked
townships in Saxony.

=== Treasure hoards ===
Various hoards of treasure were buried in England at this time. Some of these may have been deposited by Anglo-Saxons attempting to hide their wealth from Viking raiders, and others by the Viking raiders as a way of protecting their looted treasure.

One of these hoards, discovered in Croydon (historically part of Surrey, now in Greater London) in 1862, contained 250 coins, three silver ingots, and part of a fourth as well as four pieces of hack silver in a linen bag. Archaeologists interpret this as loot collected by a member of the Viking army. By dating the artefacts, archaeologists estimated that this hoard had been buried in 872, when the army wintered in London. The coins themselves came from a wide range of different kingdoms, with Wessex, Mercian, and East Anglian examples found alongside foreign imports from Carolingian-dynasty Francia and from the Arab world. Not all such Viking hoards in England contain coins, however: for example, at Bowes Moor, Durham, 19 silver ingots were discovered, whilst at Orton Scar, Cumbria, a silver neck-ring and penannular brooch were uncovered.

The historian Peter Hunter Blair believed that the success of the Viking raids and the "complete unpreparedness of Britain to meet such attacks" became major factors in the subsequent Viking invasions and colonisation of large parts of the British Isles.

== Invasion and Danelaw: 865–954 ==
From 865, the Viking attitude towards the British Isles changed, as they began to see it as a place for potential colonisation rather than simply a place to raid. As a result of this, larger armies began arriving on Britain's shores, with the intention of conquering land and constructing settlements there. The early Viking settlers would have appeared visibly different from the Anglo-Saxon populace, wearing Scandinavian styles of jewellery, and probably also wearing their own peculiar styles of clothing. Viking and Anglo-Saxon men also had different hairstyles: Viking men's hair was shaved at the back and left shaggy on the front, whilst the Anglo-Saxons typically wore their hair long.

=== England ===
In 865, a group of hitherto uncoordinated bands of predominantly Danish Vikings joined to form a large army and landed in East Anglia. The Anglo-Saxon Chronicle described this force as the mycel hæþen here (Great Heathen Army) and went on to say that it was led by Ivar the Boneless and Halfdan Ragnarsson. The army crossed the Midlands into Northumbria and captured York (Jorvik), the major city in the Kingdom of Northumbria, in 866. Counterattacks concluded in a decisive defeat for Anglo-Saxon forces at York on 21 March 867, and the deaths of Northumbrian leaders Ælla and Osberht. In 871, the Great Heathen Army was reinforced by another Danish force known as the Great Summer Army led by Guthrum. In 875, the Great Heathen Army split into two bands, with Guthrum leading one back to Wessex, and Halfdan taking his followers north. Then in 876, Halfdan shared out Northumbrian land south of the Tees amongst his men, who "ploughed the land and supported themselves", founding the territory later known as the Danelaw. (Note: Not all the Norse arriving in Ireland and Great Britain came as raiders. Many arrived with families and livestock, often in the wake of the capture of territory by their forces. The populations then merged over time by intermarriage into the Anglo-Saxon population of these areas. Many words in the English language come from old Scandinavian languages.)

Other Anglo-Saxon kings began to capitulate to the Viking demands and surrendered land to Viking settlers. In addition, many areas in eastern and northern England—including all but the northernmost parts of Northumbria—came under the direct rule of Viking leaders or their puppet kings.

Great Heathen Army battles

King Æthelred of Wessex, who had been leading the conflict against the Vikings, died in 871 and was succeeded on the throne of Wessex by his younger brother, Alfred. The Viking king of Northumbria, Halfdan Ragnarrson (Old English: Healfdene)—one of the leaders of the Viking Great Army (known to the Anglo-Saxons as the Great Heathen Army)—surrendered his lands to a second wave of Viking invaders in 876. In the next four years, Vikings gained further land in the kingdoms of Mercia and East Anglia as well. King Alfred continued his conflict with the invading forces but was driven back into Somerset in the south-west of his kingdom in 878, where he was forced to take refuge in the marshes of Athelney.

England in 878

Alfred regrouped his military forces and defeated the armies of the Viking monarch of East Anglia, Guthrum, at the Battle of Edington (May 878). Sometime after the Battle of Edington, a treaty was agreed that set out the lasting peace terms between the two kings that included the boundaries of each of their kingdoms. It is known as the Treaty of Alfred and Guthrum. The treaty is one of the few existing documents (Note: There are only three surviving documents from the Anglo-Saxon period that can be described as peace treaties.) of Alfred's reign and survives in Old English in Corpus Christi College, Cambridge, Manuscript 383, and in a Latin compilation, known as Quadripartitus. The areas to the north and east became known as the Danelaw because it was under Viking political influence, whilst those areas to the south and west remained under Anglo-Saxon dominance. Alfred's government set about constructing a series of defended towns or burhs, began the construction of a navy, and organised a militia system (the fyrd), whereby half of his peasant army remained on active service at any one time. To maintain the burhs, and the standing army, he set up a taxation and conscription system known as the Burghal Hidage.

In 892 a new Viking army, with 250 ships, established itself in Appledore, Kent and another army of 80 ships soon afterwards in Milton Regis. The army then launched a continuous series of attacks on Wessex. However, due in part to the efforts of Alfred and his army, the kingdom's new defences proved to be a success, and the Viking invaders were met with a determined resistance and made less of an impact than they had hoped. By 896, the invaders dispersed—instead settling in East Anglia and Northumbria, with some instead sailing to Normandy.

Alfred's policy of opposing the Viking settlers continued under his daughter Æthelflæd, who married Æthelred, Ealdorman of Mercia, and also under her brother, King Edward the Elder (reigned 899–924). When Edward died in July 924, his son Æthelstan became king. In 927, he conquered the last remaining Viking kingdom, York, making him the first Anglo-Saxon ruler of the whole of England. In 934, he invaded Scotland and forced Constantine II to submit to him, but Æthelstan's rule was resented by the Scots and Vikings, and, in 937, they invaded England. Æthelstan defeated them at the Battle of Brunanburh, a victory which gave him great prestige both in the British Isles and on the Continent and led to the collapse of Viking power in northern Britain. After his death in 939, the Vikings seized back control of York, and it was not finally reconquered until 954.

Edward's son Edmund became king of the English in 939. However, when Edmund was killed in a brawl, his younger brother, Eadred of Wessex took over as king. Then in 947 the Northumbrians rejected Eadred and made the Norwegian Eric Bloodaxe (Eirik Haraldsson) their king. Eadred responded by invading and ravaging Northumbria. When the Saxons headed back south, Eric Bloodaxe's army caught up with some of them at Castleford and made 'great slaughter (Note: The Anglo-Saxon Chronicle Worcester MSS D for 948 CE says: "And when the king [Eadred] was on his way home, the raiding army [Eric Bloodaxe], which was in York, overtook the king's army at Castleford and a great slaughter was made there.")'. Eadred threatened to destroy Northumbria in revenge, so the Northumbrians turned their back on Eric and acknowledged Eadred as their king. The Northumbrians then had another change of heart and accepted Olaf Sihtricsson as their ruler, only to have Eric Bloodaxe remove him and become king of the Northumbrians again. Then, in 954, Eric Bloodaxe was expelled (Note: The Anglo-Saxon Chronicle says that Bloodaxe was 'driven out' from Northumbria; however, other sources claim that he was also killed.) for the second and final time by Eadred. Bloodaxe was the last Norse king of Northumbria.

== Second invasion: 980–1042 ==
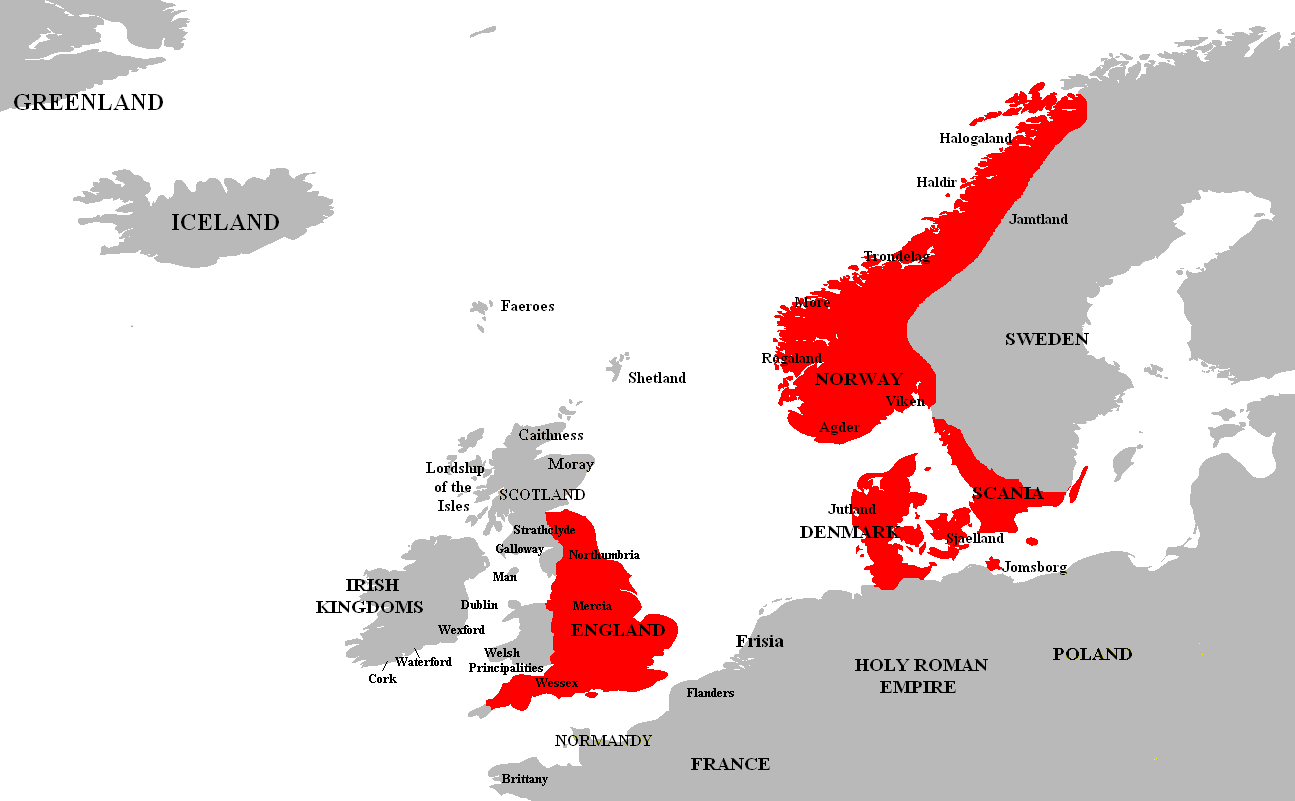
Cnut the Great's domains, in red.

=== England ===
Under the reign of Wessex King Edgar the Peaceful, England came to be further politically unified, with Edgar coming to be recognised as the king of all England by both Anglo-Saxon and Viking populations living in the country. However, in the reigns of his son Edward the Martyr, who was murdered in 978, and then Æthelred the Unready, the political strength of the English monarchy waned, and, in 980, raiders from Scandinavia resumed attacks against England. The English government decided that the only way of dealing with these attackers was to pay them protection money, and so, in 991, they gave them £10,000. This fee did not prove to be enough, and, over the next decade, the English kingdom was forced to pay the Viking attackers increasingly large sums of money. Many English began to demand that a more hostile approach be taken against the Vikings, and so, on St Brice's Day in 1002, King Æthelred proclaimed that all Danes living in England would be executed. It would come to be known as the St. Brice's Day massacre.

The news of the massacre reached King Sweyn Forkbeard in Denmark. It is believed that Sweyn's sister Gunhilde could have been among the victims, which prompted Sweyn to raid England the following year, when Exeter was burned down. Hampshire, Wiltshire, Wilton, and Salisbury also fell victim to the Viking revenge attack. Sweyn continued his raid in England and in 1004 his Viking army looted East Anglia, plundered Thetford and sacked Norwich, before he once again returned to Denmark.

Further raids took place in 1006–1007 then Sweyn was paid over 10 000 pounds of silver to leave, and, in 1009–1012, Thorkell the Tall led a Viking invasion into England.

==== Danish rule 1016-1042 ====
In 1013, Swein Forkbeard launched a full-scale invasion of England. He received the submission of the north and the midlands, and although an attack on London was unsuccessful, the town submitted when the south-west surrendered. Swein was recognised as king and Æthelred fled to Normandy after Christmas. Swein died on 3 February 1014 and Æthelred returned, driving out Swein’s son Cnut. But, in 1015, Cnut returned with a fleet of 200 ships, launching a war that would last for over a year. Æthelred died in April 1016 and was succeeded by his son Edmund Ironside, who fought a vigorous campaign until defeated by Cnut at the Battle of Assandun on 18 October. Cnut and Edmund then agreed to divide England between them, Cnut taking the north and Edmund the south. Cnut became king of England upon Edmund’s death on 30 November, and ruled over a North Sea Empire of Denmark, England and Norway. Following Cnut's death in 1035, England was ruled successively by two of his sons until Harthacnut's death in 1042.

== Harald's invasion (1066) ==
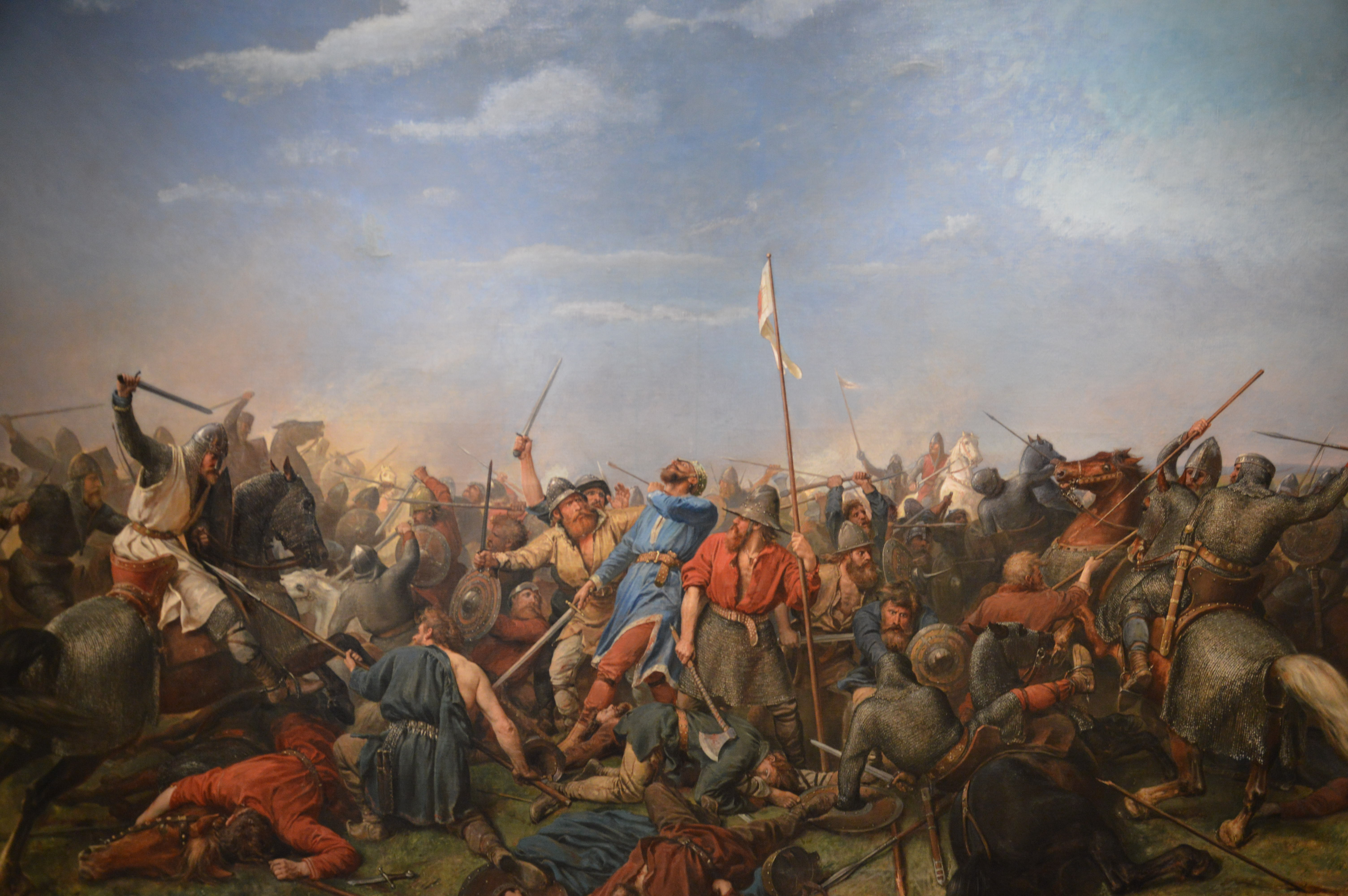
The Battle of Stamford Bridge (1870), Peter Nicolai Arbo

Harald Hardrada, King of Norway, led an invasion of England in 1066 with 300 longships and 10,000 soldiers, attempting to seize the English throne during the succession dispute following the death of Edward the Confessor. He met initial success, defeating the outnumbered forces mustered by the earldoms of Northumbria and Mercia at the Battle of Fulford. Whilst basking in his victory and occupying Northumbria in preparation for the advance south, Harald's army was surprised by a similarly sized force led by King Harold Godwinson, which had managed to force march all the way there from London in a week. The invasion was repulsed at the Battle of Stamford Bridge, and Hardrada was killed along with most of his men. Whilst the Viking attempt was unsuccessful, the near simultaneous Norman invasion was successful in the south at the Battle of Hastings. Hardrada's invasion and defeat has been described as the end of the Viking Age in Britain.

== Written records ==
The Kingdom of the Isles about the year 1100

Archaeologists James Graham-Campbell and Colleen E. Batey noted that there was a lack of historical sources discussing the earliest Viking encounters with the British Isles, which would have most probably been amongst the northern island groups, those closest to Scandinavia.

The Irish Annals provide us with accounts of much Viking activity during the 9th and 10th centuries.

The England Runestones, concentrated in Sweden, give accounts of the voyages from the Viking perspective.

The Viking raids that affected Anglo-Saxon England were primarily documented in the Anglo-Saxon Chronicle, a collection of annals initially written in the late ninth century, most probably in the Kingdom of Wessex during the reign of Alfred the Great. The Chronicle is, however, a biased source, acting as a piece of "wartime propaganda" written on behalf of the Anglo-Saxon forces against their Viking opponents, and, in many cases, greatly exaggerates the size of the Viking fleets and armies, thereby making any Anglo-Saxon victories against them seem more heroic.

== Archaeological evidence ==
The Viking settlers in the British Isles left remains of their material culture behind, which archaeologists have been able to excavate and interpret during the 20th and 21st centuries. Such Viking evidence in Britain consists primarily of Viking burials undertaken in Shetland, Orkney, the Western Isles, the Isle of Man, Ireland, and the north-west of England. Archaeologists James Graham-Campbell and Colleen E. Batey remarked that it was on the Isle of Man where Norse archaeology was "remarkably rich in quality and quantity".

However, as archaeologist Julian D. Richards commented, Scandinavians in Anglo-Saxon England "can be elusive to the archaeologist" because many of their houses and graves are indistinguishable from those of the other populations living in the country. For this reason, historian Peter Hunter Blair noted that, in Britain, the archaeological evidence for Viking invasion and settlement was "very slight compared with the corresponding evidence for the Anglo-Saxon invasions" of the fifth century.

== See also ==
- Kingdom of the Isles
- Scandinavian Scotland
- Orkney
- Earldom of Orkney
- History of Shetland
- Orkneyinga saga
- Viking Age
- Category:Scandinavian Scotland
- Norman conquest of England
