= Allendale Moors =

Moorland in Northumberland, England

- Site of Special Scientific Interest
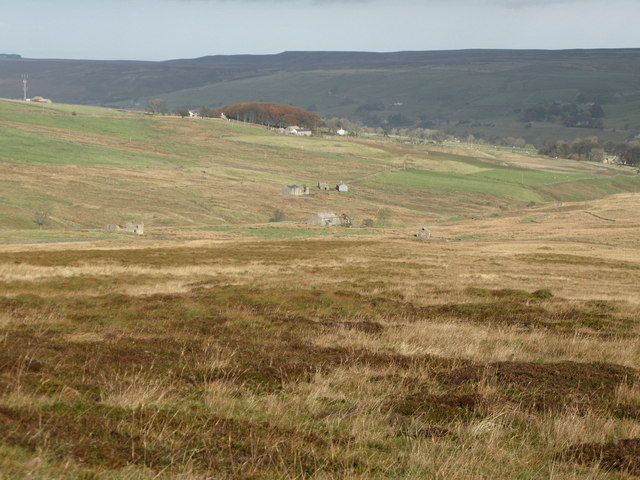
- Allendale Common, moorland at the south-east of the SSSI

- Location within Northumberland
- Location of Allendale Moors.
- Area of search: Northumberland
- Grid reference: NY820480, NY790470
- Coordinates: 54.8309°N 2.2861°W
- Interest: Biological
- Area: 5,282.81 hectares (20 sq mi)
- Notification date: 1998
- Location map: DEFRA MAGIC map

Allendale Moors is a Site of Special Scientific Interest (SSSI) in Northumberland, England. The upland moorland ridge site is listed for its heath, flush and upland grassland which provide a habitat for a nationally important assemblage of moorland breeding birds.

== Location and natural features ==
Allendale Moors is situated in the north-east of England, 6 miles (9.7 km) east of Alston and 0.5 miles (0.80 km) west of Allenheads, and between East and West Allen Dales – tributaries of the River Allen – and Nent Dale and Upper Weardale; all found in the south-west of the Northumberland. The u-shaped site, which excludes the valley of the West River Allen from Carrshield northwards, is some 7.4 miles (11.9 km) north to south, and 6 miles (9.7 km) east to west. It is at the northern extent and part of the North Pennines, itself designated as an Area of Outstanding Natural Beauty, and it borders three other SSSI, Whitfield Moor, Plenmeller and Ashholme Commons, High Knock Shield Meadow and White Ridge Meadow, and it overlaps Hartley Cleugh SSSI. Hexhamshire Moors SSSI is immediately to the east, separated by the valley of the River East Allen.

The site is composed of upland moorland ridges and plateau, above a number of north to south falling watercourses – between the River Nent to the west and slightly eastwards, the River West Allen; and then between the River West Allen and the River East Allen. The site is at elevations from circa 400 metres (1,300 ft) along the northerly boundaries, to circa 600 metres (2,000 ft) and above on the southern boundary. The terrain is one of the most extensive blanket mires in the north of England, and provides a variety of heath, flush and upland grassland habitats for moorland breeding birds. Underlying the mire is Carboniferous limestone, with abundant lichen-rich outcrops. More generally, Allendale is part of a mineral rich area – the North Pennine Orefield – long-mined and thus littered with spoil heaps of varying ages and states of revegetation, affected by heavy metal contamination, particularly from zinc and lead, and supporting metal tolerant plants such as spring sandwort (Minuartia verna).

=== Vegetation ===
The moorland has a number of distinct vegetative zones. The plateau is dominated by heather (Calluna vulgaris) and hare's-tail cottongrass (Eriophorum vaginatum) with local patches of cross-leaved heath (Erica tetralix). Other notable species include deergrass (Trichophorum cespitosum), crowberry (Empetrum nigrum) round-leaved sundew (Drosera rotundifolia) and bog mosses such as (Sphagnum papillosum) and (S. capillifolium var. rubellum).

Dry heath and acid grassland is found on peripheral areas of the plateau, the former supporting heather, wavy hair - grass (Deschampsia flexuosa) and bilberry (Vaccinium myrtillus), and with heath rush (Juncus squarrosus) dominating the latter, with mat-grass (Nardus stricta), wavy hair-grass tormentil, (Potentilla erecta) and heath bedstraw (Galium saxatile).

The moor has numerous areas of acidic flush characterised by an abundance of soft-rush (Juncus effusus), bog moss (Sphagnum recurvum) and star-moss (Polytrichum commune). There are also a smaller number of species-rich flushes supporting sharp-flowered rush (Juncus acutiflorus), common sedge (Carex nigra), star sedge (Carex echinata), marsh bedstraw (Galium palustre), lesser spearwort (Ranunculus flammula) and marsh violet (Viola palustris).

Great Limestone outcrops support rich lichen communities, including elm gyalecta (Gyalecta ulmi), a rare and endangered species, and a number of other species rare in Northumberland.

=== Fauna ===
The open moorland supports a collection of breeding birds considered to be of national importance, and including merlin, golden plover, red grouse, black grouse, short-eared owl and dunlin. The moor and associated grassland supports curlew, snipe, lapwing and redshank.

== Ownership ==
The land is owned by Allendale Estates, the estate management company of the 4th Viscount Allendale. The majority of the site is common land under the designation "Allendale Common and land at Mohope Moor and Pinch Park".

== See also ==
- List of Sites of Special Scientific Interest in Northumberland
