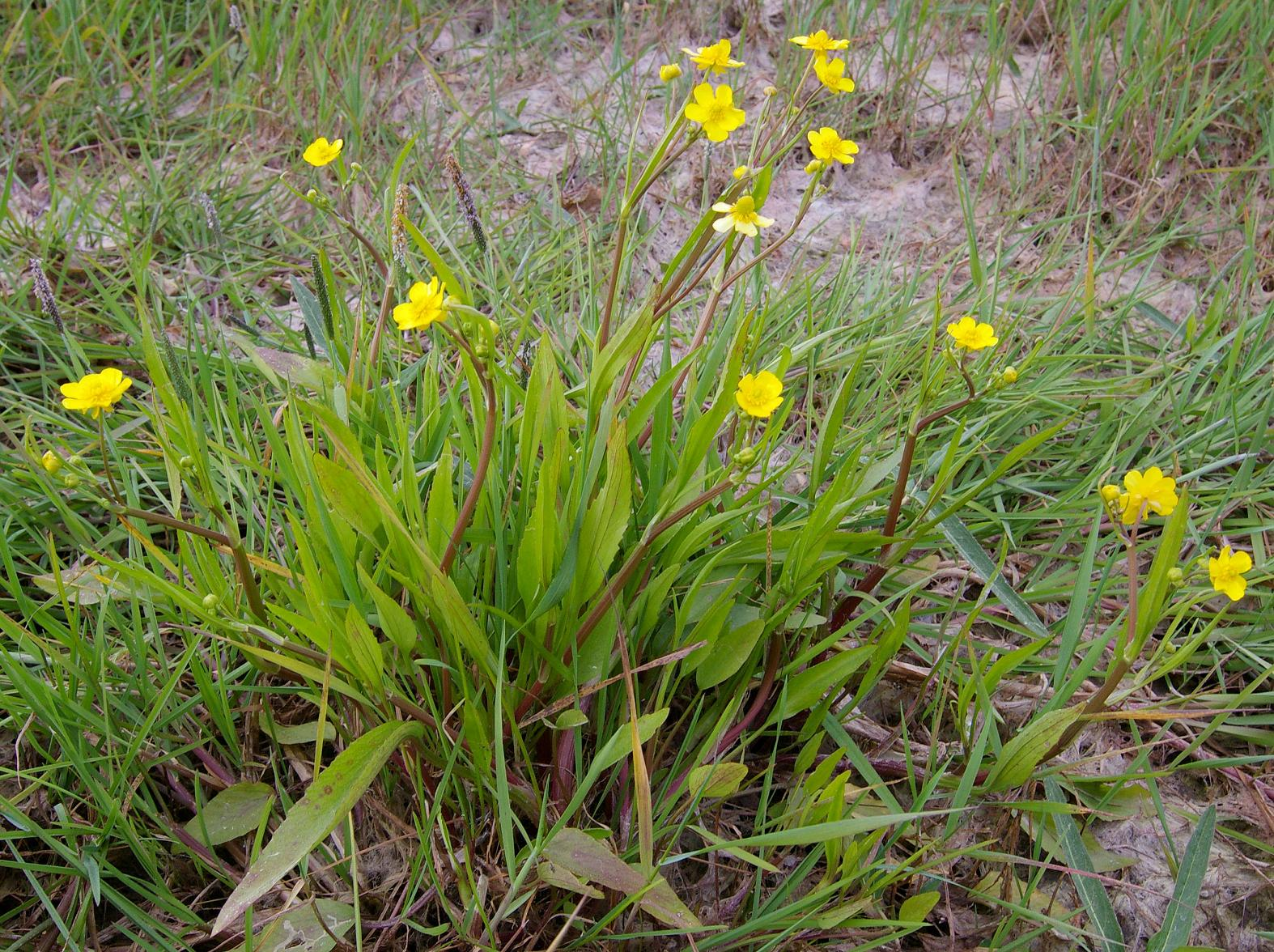

Conservation status
- Least Concern (IUCN 3.1)

Scientific classification
- Kingdom: Plantae
- Clade: Tracheophytes
- Clade: Angiosperms
- Clade: Eudicots
- Order: Ranunculales
- Family: Ranunculaceae
- Genus: Ranunculus
- Species: R. flammula

Binomial name
- Ranunculus flammula L.

= Ranunculus flammula =

Lesser spearwort

Species of flowering plant

Ranunculus flammula, the lesser spearwort, greater creeping spearwort or banewort, is a species of perennial herbaceous plants in the genus Ranunculus (buttercup), growing in damp places throughout the Boreal Kingdom. It flowers June/July. Ranunculus flammula is poisonous. It is very closely related to R. reptans, which is distinguished by prostrate and more slender stems, narrower leaves and smaller flowers and is sometimes included within R. flammula sensu lato as a variety (R. flammula var. reptans (L.) E. Meyer).

In addition to other forms of pollination, this plant is adapted to rain-pollination.

== Gallery ==
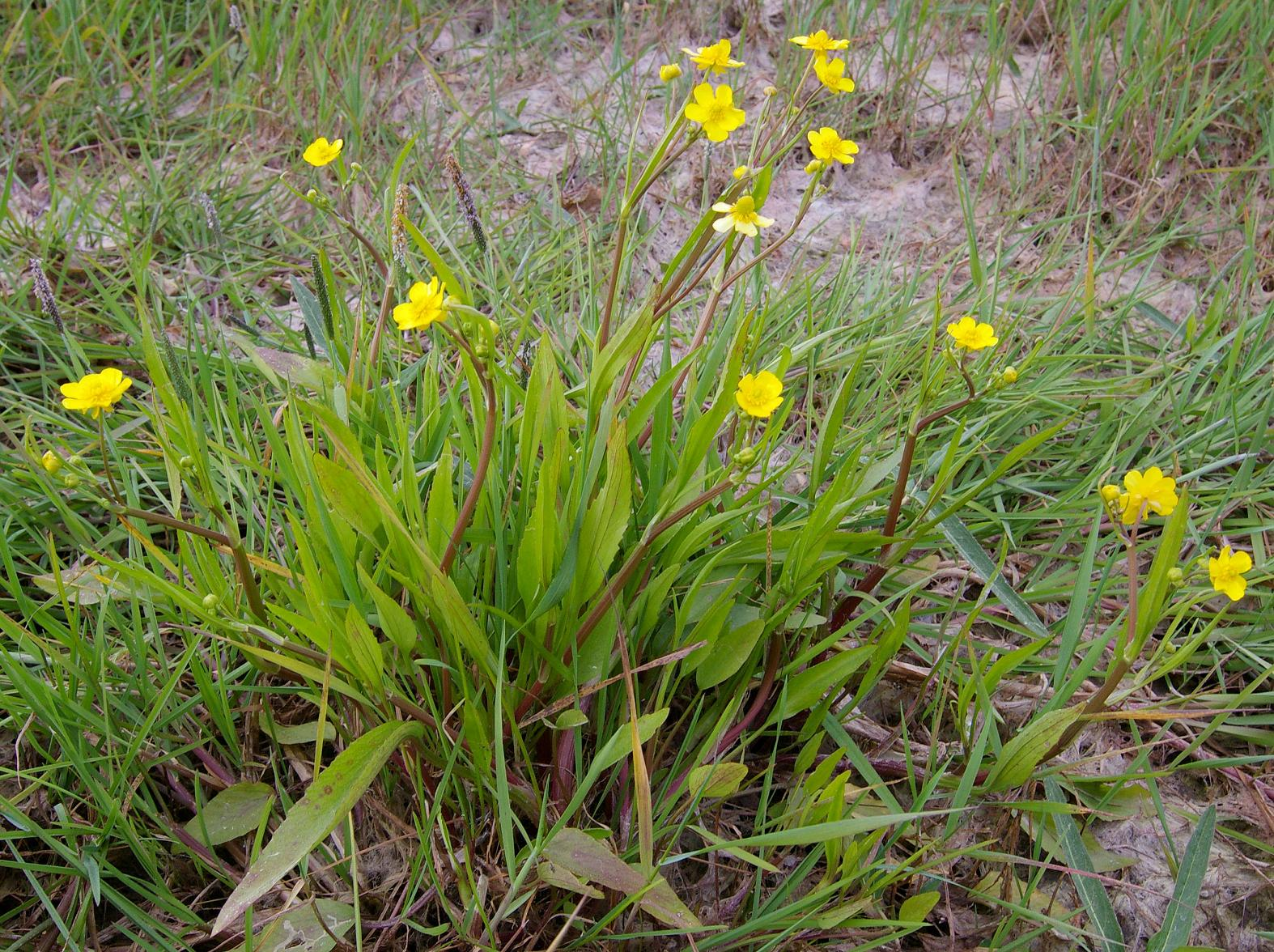

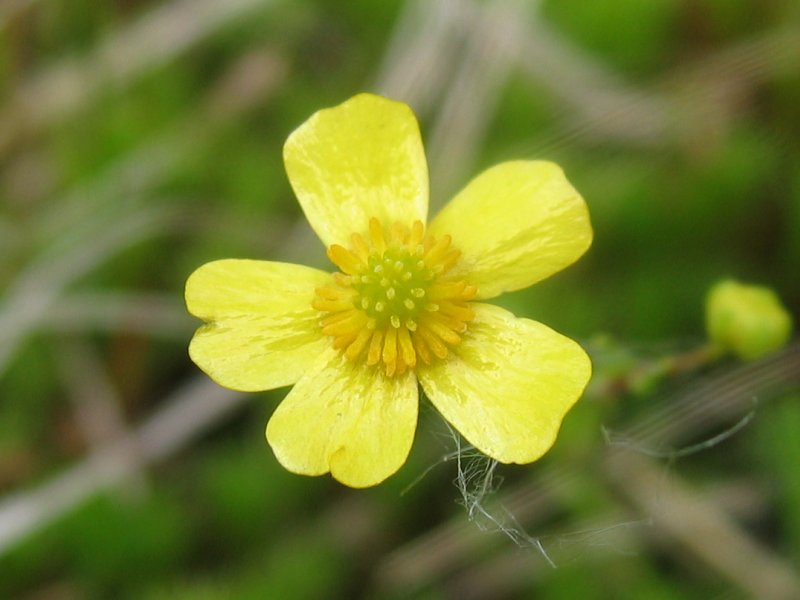

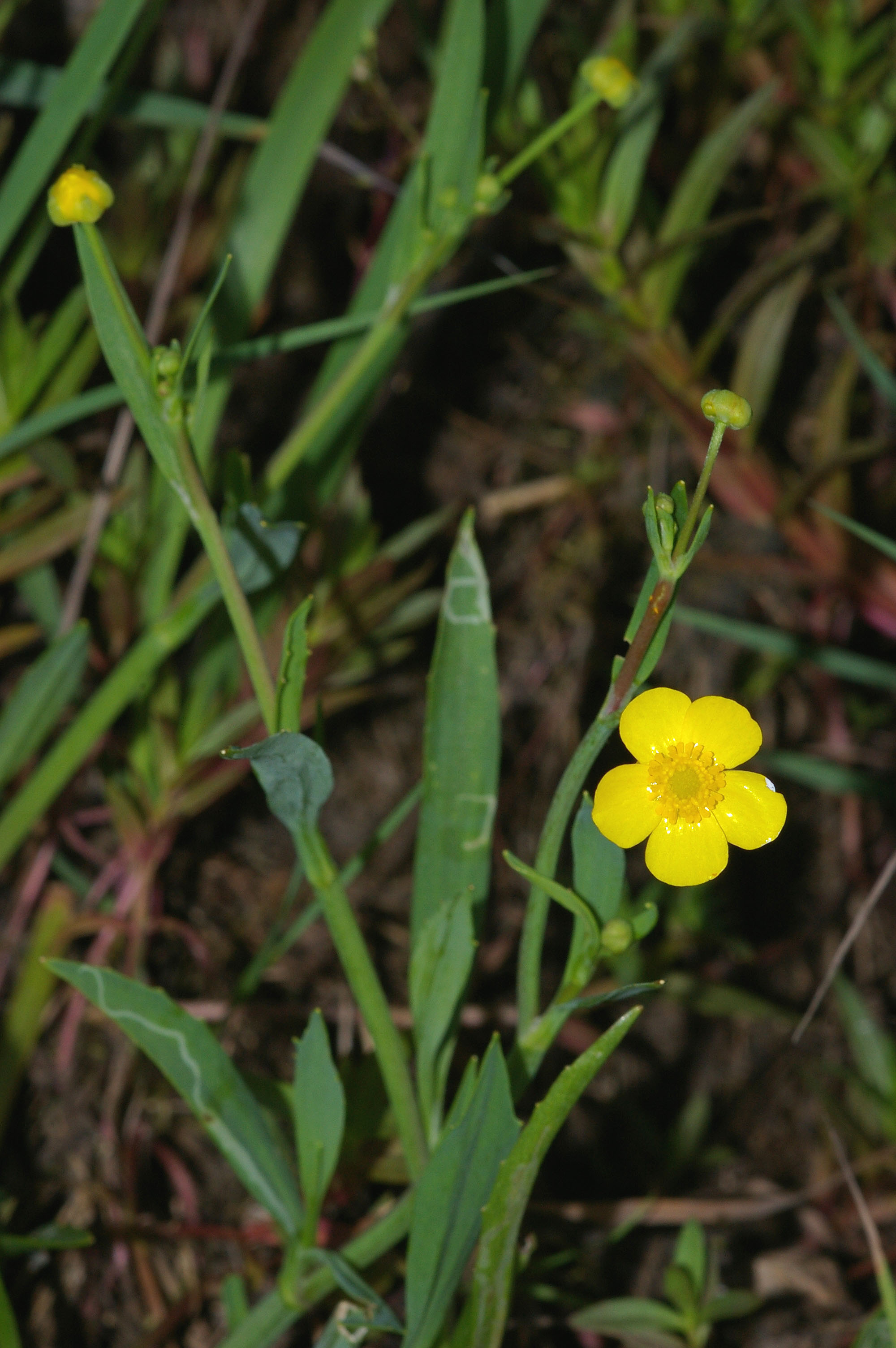

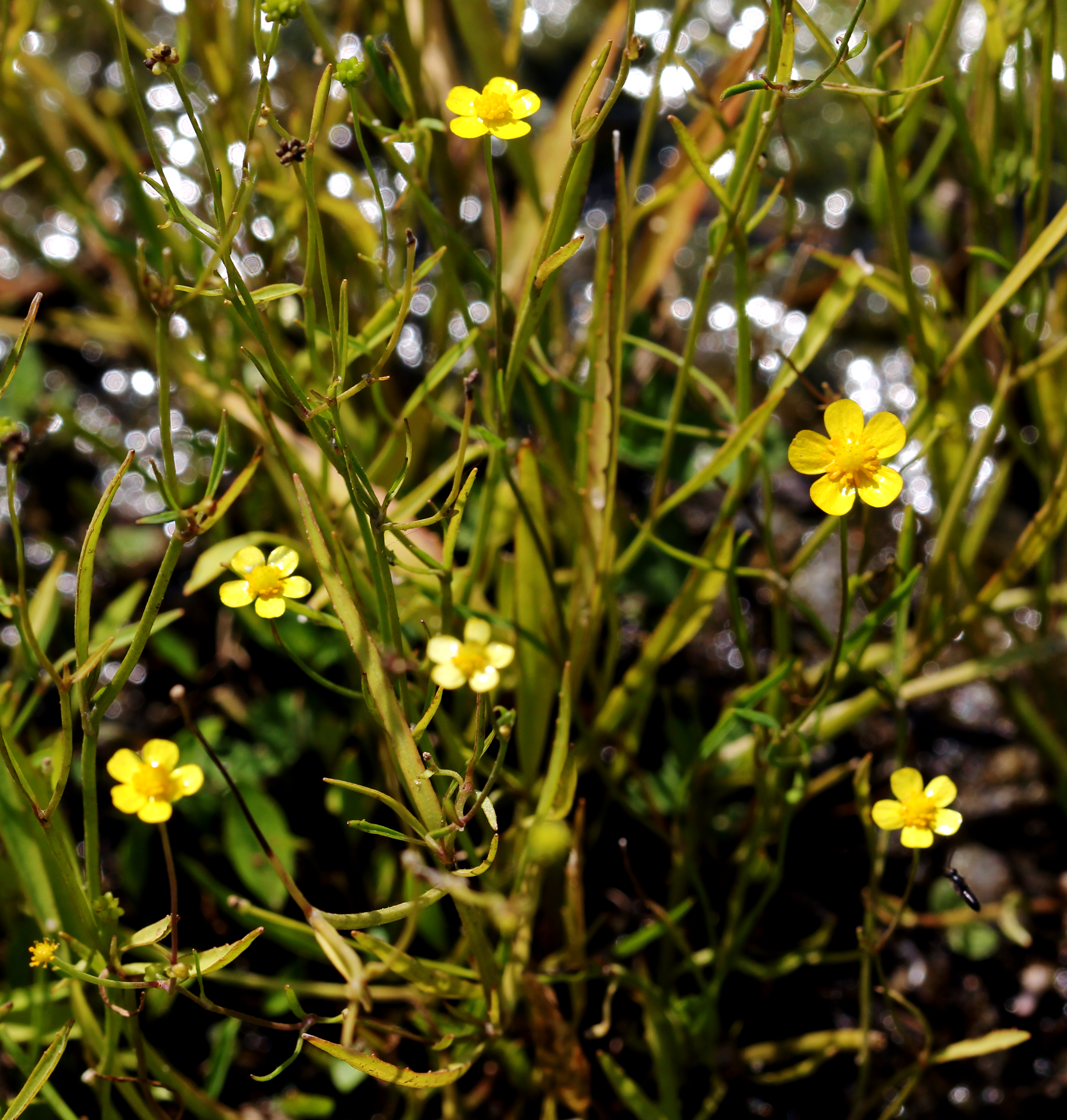

== Illustrations ==
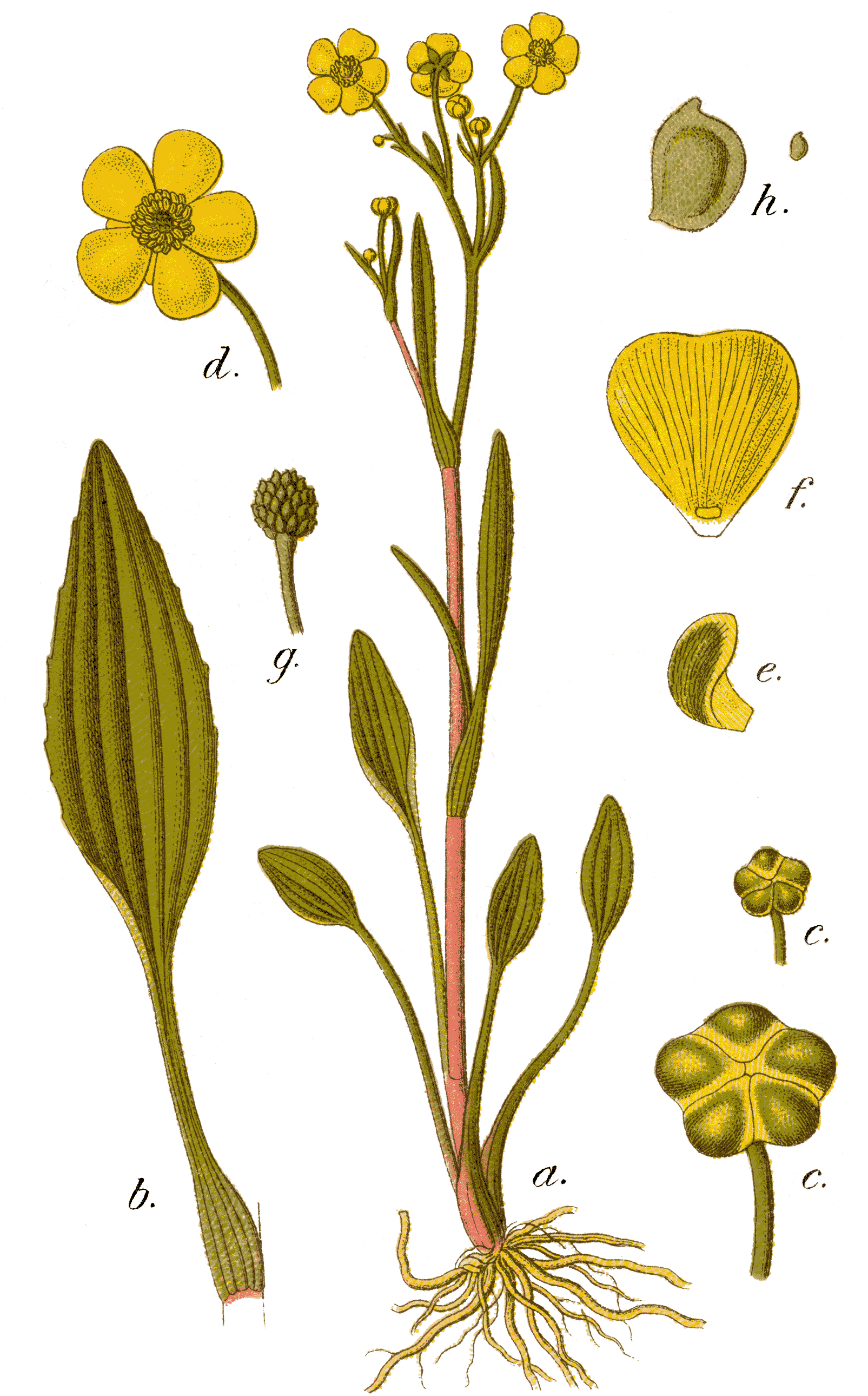
Ranunculus flammula
Illustration in:
Jakob Sturm: "Deutschlands Flora in Abbildungen",
Stuttgart (1796)

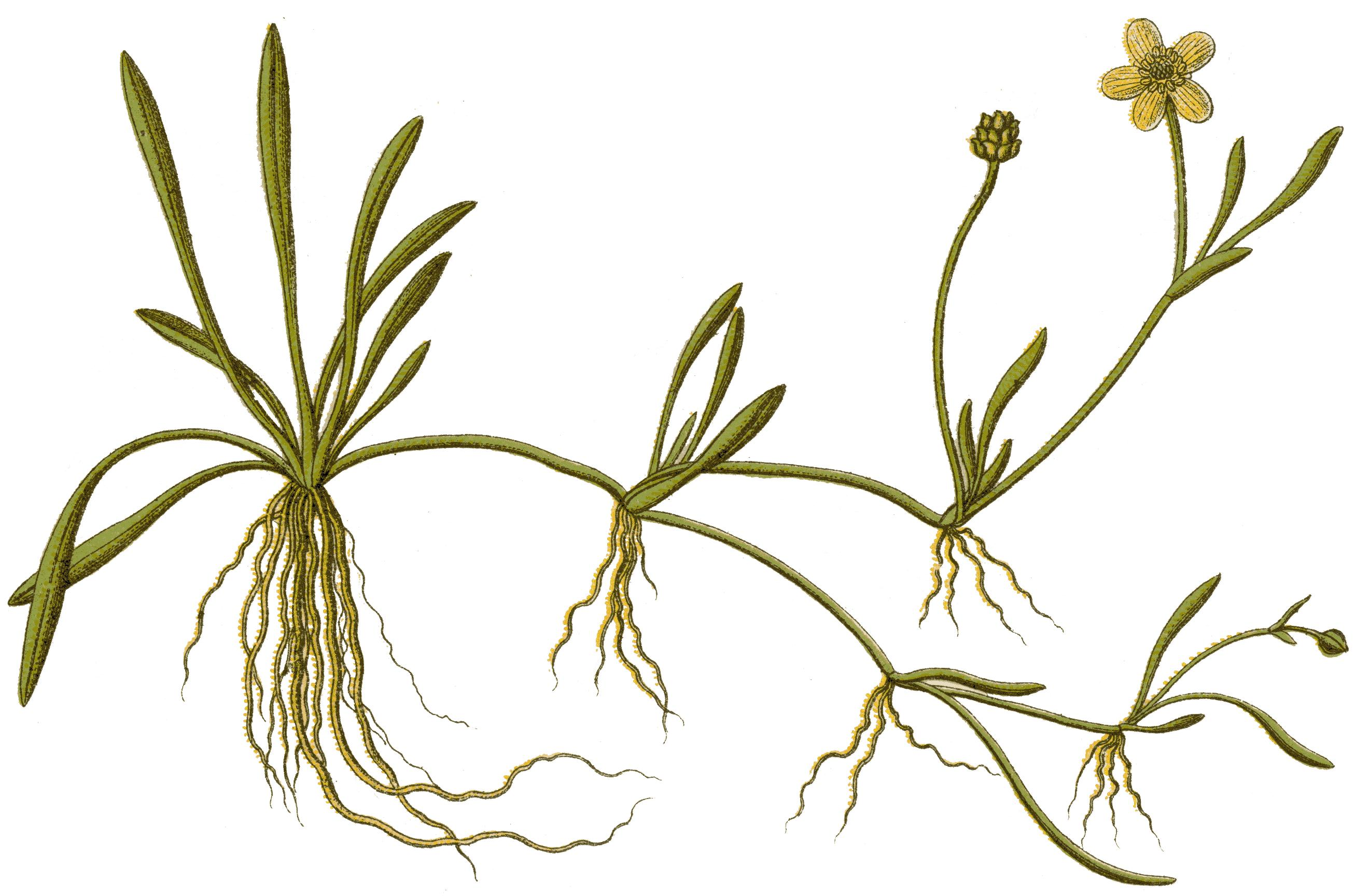
Ranunculus flammula var reptans
Illustration in:
Jakob Sturm: "Deutschlands Flora in Abbildungen",
Stuttgart (1796)

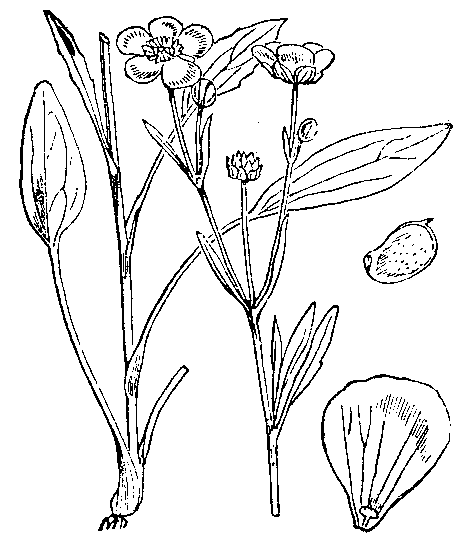
Žgoča zlatica. (Ranúnculus Flámmula.)
Illustration #29 in: Martin Cilenšek: Naše škodljive rastline, Celovec (1892)
