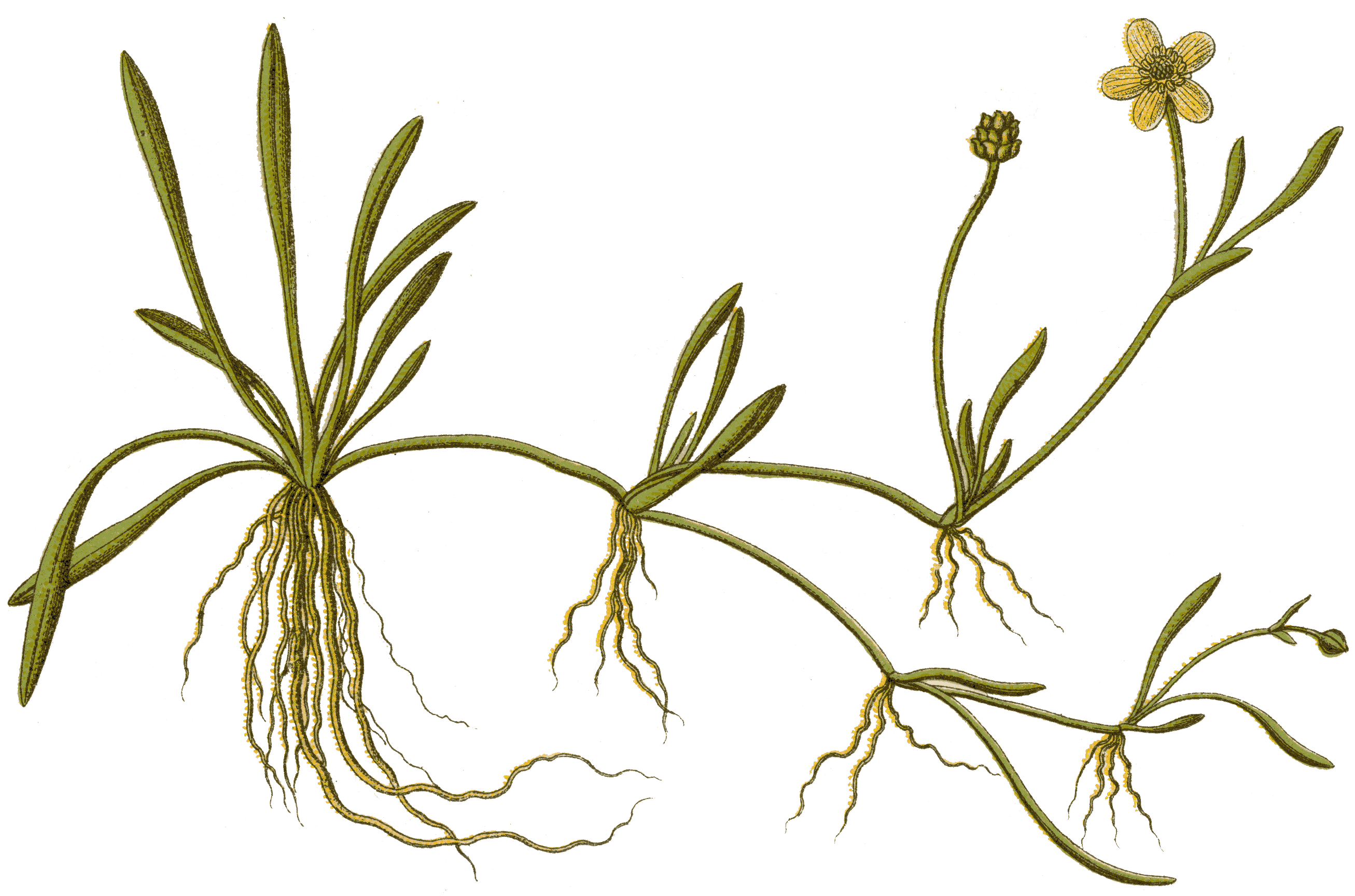

Scientific classification
- Kingdom: Plantae
- Clade: Tracheophytes
- Clade: Angiosperms
- Clade: Eudicots
- Order: Ranunculales
- Family: Ranunculaceae
- Genus: Ranunculus
- Species: R. reptans

Binomial name
- Ranunculus reptans L.

= Ranunculus reptans =

Species of flowering plant

Ranunculus reptans is a species of flowering plant belonging to the family Ranunculaceae.

Its native range is Subarctic and Temperate Northern Hemisphere.
