= Hexhamshire Moors =

Moorland in northern England

- Location within County Durham
- Location: MAGiC MaP
- Nearest town: Hexham
- Coordinates: 54°50′N 2°12′W
- Area: 9,434 ha (36.42 sq mi)
- Established: 1998
- Governing body: Natural England
- Website: Hexhamshire Moors SSSI

Hexhamshire Moors is a Site of Special Scientific Interest covering an extensive area of moorland in the Wear Valley district of north-west County Durham and the Tynedale district of south-west Northumberland, England.

It is a broadly rectangular area, occupying most of the upland between the valleys of the River East Allen to the west and Devil's Water to the east. The southern part of the site shares boundaries with the Muggleswick, Stanhope and Edmundbyers Commons and Blanchland Moor SSSI to the east and is separated from the Allendale Moors SSSI only by a very narrow strip of the East Allen valley.

The area has one of the largest expanses of blanket bog and heathland in northern England. Acid bogs occur in the vicinity of the numerous flushes that drain the moorland plateau, and localised patches of acid grassland have developed in areas that are regularly grazed by sheep.

Floristically, much of the area is species-poor, but there are small populations of some nationally scarce species, including bog orchid, Hammarbya paludosa, which is found on the blanket peat, and forked spleenwort, Asplenium septentrionale, whose presence at one locality in the Northumberland part of the site is, to date, the only known record for that county.

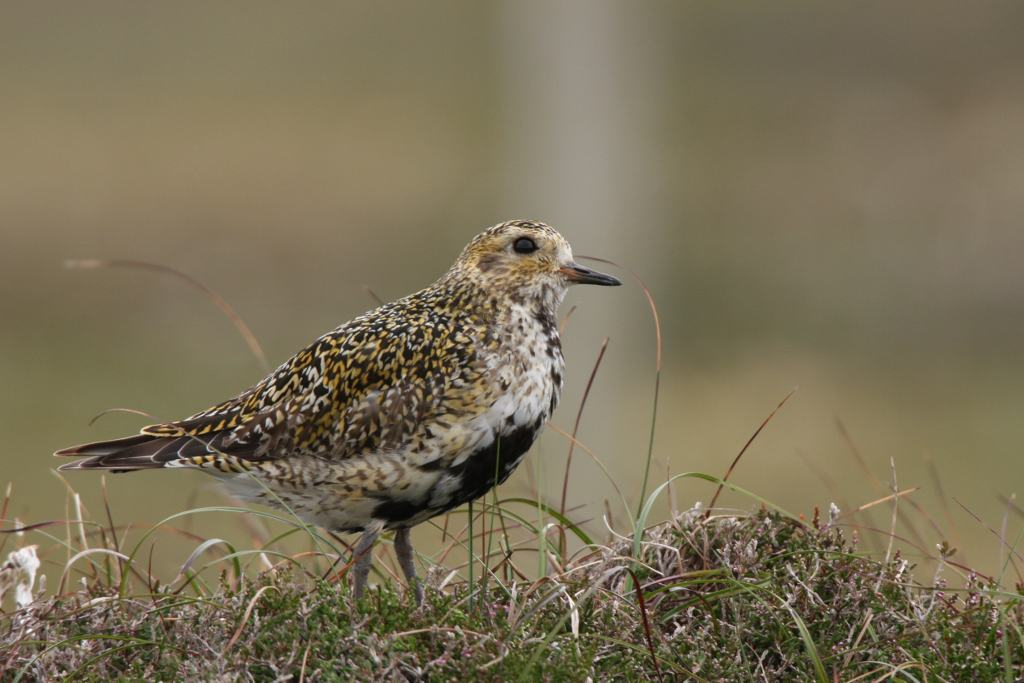
Eurasian golden plover, Pluvialis apricaria

The site's principal importance lies in its nationally important breeding populations of birds: three species—merlin, Eurasian golden plover and short-eared owl—are listed in Annex 1 of the European Commission's Birds Directive as requiring special protection and several others, including red grouse, Eurasian curlew, common redshank, Eurasian oystercatcher and dunlin, are listed in the United Kingdom's Red Data Book (Birds).

Much of the moorland heath also supports a rich assemblage of invertebrates, including several scarce species of ground beetle, Carabidae.

The site is within the North Pennines Area of Outstanding Natural Beauty.
