= Bowes Moor =

Environmentally protected area in England

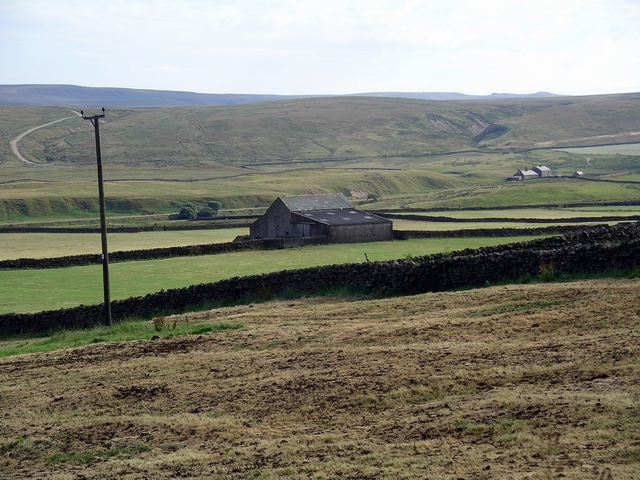
- Bowes Moor looking south from the A66, 2.7 km (1.7 mi) east of Rey Cross

- Location within County Durham
- Location: Teesdale, North East, England
- Nearest town: Barnard Castle
- Coordinates: 54°29′22″N 2°7′11″W
- Area: 4,457.7 ha (17.211 sq mi)
- Max. elevation: 571 m (1,873 ft)
- Designation: SSSI
- Established: 1989
- Governing body: Natural England
- Website: Map of site

Bowes Moor is a Site of Special Scientific Interest in the County Durham district in south-west County Durham, England. It is an extensive area of moorland, most of it covered by blanket bog, which supports significant breeding populations of a number of wading birds. The SSSI forms part of the North Pennine Moors SAC, a Special Area of Conservation.

The Pennine Way National Trail passes through the area, as does the A66 road, which crosses Bowes Moor using the Stainmore Gap between Bowes and Stainmore. Bowes Moor sits on the River Greta and has changed very little since Roman times. Many Roman artifacts have been found here over the years, including a Roman aqueduct.

== Site of Special Scientific Interest ==
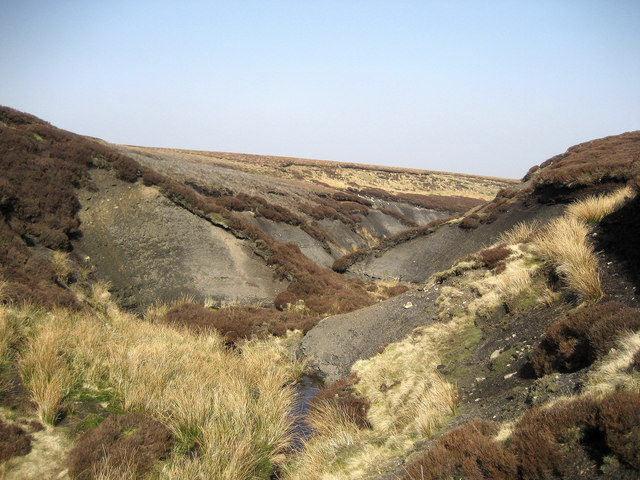
Mirk Fell Gill, in unit 7

The Bowes Moor Site of Special Scientific Interest (SSSI) is designated for its "numerous and diverse moorland bird communities." The main habitat is blanket bog, and the SSSI designation draws attention to the range of vegetation and breeding birds to be found there. It is divided into north and south moors by the A66 running horizontally across it. The strip of land immediately south of the A66 is enclosed agricultural land excluded from the SSSI. The land within the SSSI is stinted common. The SSSI is the subect of the Bowes Moor SSSI Site Restoration Plan, 1st January 2018 – 31st December 2028.

For monitoring purposes, the SSSI is divided into seven "units" corresponding with the stints. Units 1, 2 and 3 are north of the corridor formed by the A66 road and the enclosed agricultural land, including the former Stainmore Railway and the River Greta. Unit 1 includes Rey Cross ancient monument and Roman camp. Units 4, 5 and 6 are south of that corridor. They run west to east, sandwiched between the Greta to their north and the Sleightholme Beck to their south. Unit 7 is south of Sleightholme Beck and runs the entire width of units 4, 5 and 6. It extends south into the former mining area near the Tan Hill Inn, on the border with the Yorkshire Dales National Park. It contains the highest ground in the SSSI, at Mirk Fell (NY914066, 571 metres (1,873 ft)).

Unit	Name	Location	Area	Assessed	Assessment
1	Hutchinson (north)	NY913133	857.4 ha (3.310 sq mi)	30 Mar 2016	Unfavourable - Recovering
2	Addison	NY950142	697.7 ha (2.694 sq mi)	1 Jan 2017	Unfavourable - Recovering
3	Foster	NY950132	113.2 ha (0.437 sq mi)	2 Mar 2015	Unfavourable - No change
4	Hutchinson (south)	NY906103	782.5 ha (3.021 sq mi)	29 Feb 2016	Unfavourable - No change
5	Raine	NY933102	580.1 ha (2.240 sq mi)	1 Jan 2018	Unfavourable - Recovering
6	Wytham Moor	NY953112	185.5 ha (0.716 sq mi)	8 Dec 2016	Unfavourable - Recovering
7	Ettey	NY924081	1,273.5 ha (4.917 sq mi)	8 Dec 2016	Unfavourable - Recovering

Two other small areas are designated as SSSIs in their own right. Sleightholme Beck Gorge – The Troughs SSSI is immediately east of Bowes Moor Unit 6. God's Bridge SSSI is on the Greta between Bowes Moor Units 3 and 6. The southern boundary of Bowes Moor SSSI is also the northern boundary of Arkengarthdale Gunnerside and Reeth Moors SSSI.
