= Arkengarthdale Gunnerside and Reeth Moors =

Moorlands in the Yorkshire Dales, England

- Site of Special Scientific Interest
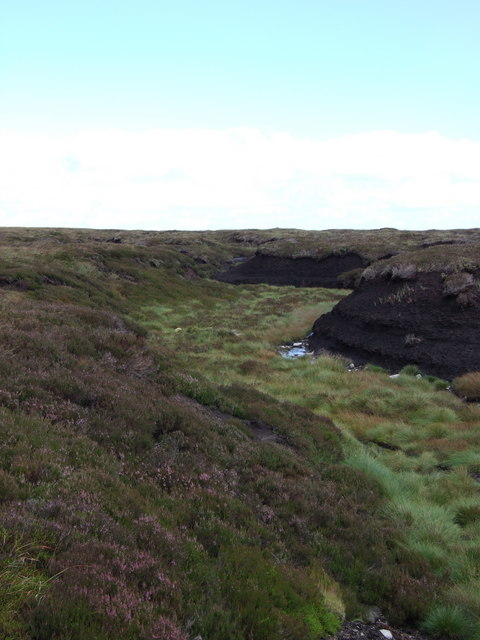

- Location within North Yorkshire
- Location of Arkengarthdale Gunnerside and Reeth Moors.
- Area of search: North Yorkshire
- Grid reference: NY935070, SD970990
- Coordinates: 54.427°N 2.076°W
- Interest: Biological
- Area: 7,634.72 ha (18,865.8 acres)
- Notification date: June 1998
- Location map: Natural England

Arkengarthdale Gunnerside and Reeth Moors (grid reference NY935070 and SD970990) is a 7,634.72 ha (29.4778 sq mi) Site of Special Scientific Interest (SSSI) designated for its biology. It is situated in the Yorkshire Dales between Arkengarthdale and Swaledale. The SSSI was first notified in June 1998. It includes blanket bog, heather moorland, and breeding bird populations such as merlin and golden plover.

The northern boundary of the SSSI is also the southern boundary of Bowes Moor SSSI.
