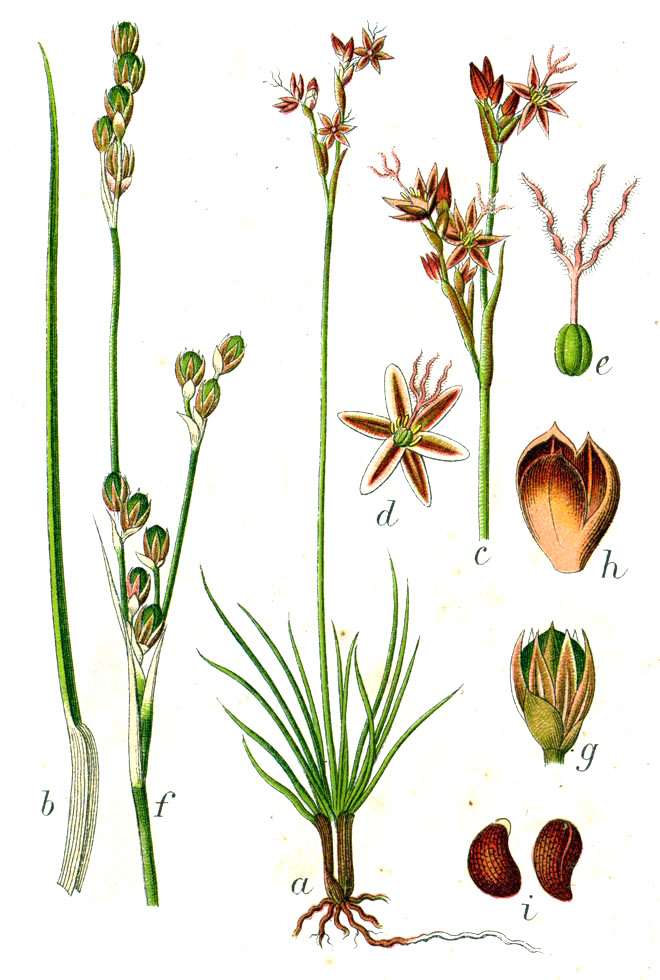
- Botanical illustration
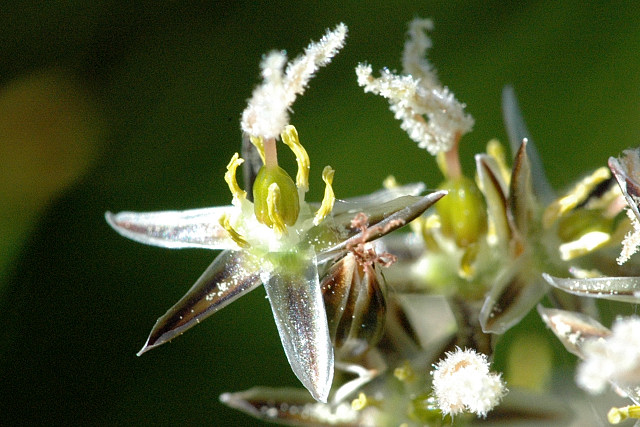
- Close-up of flowers

Scientific classification
- Kingdom: Plantae
- Clade: Tracheophytes
- Clade: Angiosperms
- Clade: Monocots
- Clade: Commelinids
- Order: Poales
- Family: Juncaceae
- Genus: Juncus
- Species: J. squarrosus

Binomial name
- Juncus squarrosus L.

Synonyms
- List: Juncus ellmanii C.E.Hubb., Sandwith & Turrill; Juncus sprengelii Willd.; Juncus strictus Lucé

= Juncus squarrosus =

Species of rush

Juncus squarrosus, called goose corn, heath rush, and mosquito rush, is a species of flowering plant in the family Juncaceae, native to Iceland, Europe, and Morocco, and introduced to Greenland, Svalbard, Tasmania, New Zealand, and the US state of Wisconsin. It is pollution-tolerant.
