= Beaduheard =

Anglo-Saxon reeve

Beaduheard was an Anglo-Saxon reeve who was based in Dorchester in Dorset, who in 789 became the first known person killed by a Viking raid in England.

== Early life ==
Nothing is known of Beaduheard's early life, including where he was born or who his parents were. However, his name (Beaduheard means "battle-hard") and position suggests that his family were of relatively high rank, from a martial background, and that he was over the age of 31, which is regarded as middle aged for the time. He was reeve during the reign of Beorhtric of Wessex, king of Wessex from 786 to 802.

== Death ==
The Anglo-Saxon Chronicle for AD 789 reports:

787 [789] (Note: Historians believe that the dates written in the Anglo-Saxon Chronicle are two years too early for the actual events at this time.) Here Beorhtric took King Offa's daughter Eadburh. And in his days came first 3 ships from Hordaland: (Note: Hordaland is the area around Hardangerfjord in Norway, but the Chronicle says that they were Danes.) and then the reeve rode there and wanted to compel them to go to the king's town because he did not know who they were; and then they killed him. These were the first ships of the Danish men which sought out the land of the English race.

Æthelweard's version of the Chronicle, known as the Chronicon Æthelweardi, a Latin translation of a lost version of the Anglo-Saxon Chronicle, goes into more detail:

Suddenly a not very large fleet of the Danes arrived, speedy vessels to the number of three; that was their first arrival. At the report the king's reeve, who was then in the town called Dorchester, leapt on his horse, sped to the harbour with a few men (for he thought they were merchants rather than marauders) and admonishing them in an authoritiative manner, gave orders that they should be driven to the royal town. And he and his companions were killed by them on the spot. And the name of the reeve was Beaduheard.

Æthelweard was writing nearly 200 years after the event, sometime after 975 and probably before 983. His account is the first to name Beaduheard; however, as his work was a Latin translation of a (now lost) Anglo-Saxon original, there is nothing to suggest that the name is incorrect.

== Aftermath ==
Four years later, in 793, a major Viking raid took place on the monastery of Lindisfarne in the kingdom of Northumberland. This has commonly been regarded as the start of the Viking raids on Britain.
