= Sack of Lindisfarne =

793 Viking raid on the island monastery

Coordinates: 55.669°N 1.801°W

Sacking of Lindisfarne
- Part of Viking expansion
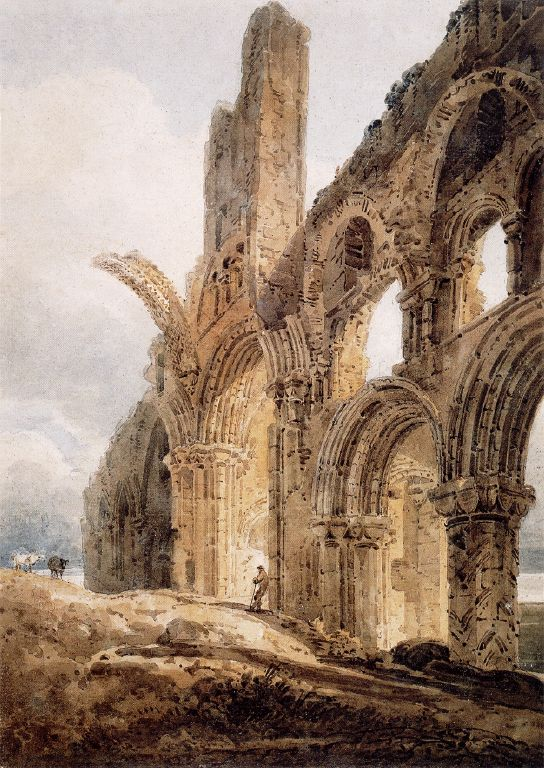
- 18th century painting by Thomas Girtin, depicting the ruins of the island
Date	8 June 793; 1233 years ago
Location	Lindisfarne, Northumbria
Result	Viking victory

Belligerents
Viking raiders	Christian monks

Strength
Unknown	at least 50

Casualties and losses
None	most slain, some enslaved and some thrown into the sea

The Sacking of Lindisfarne was a Viking raid in AD 793, targeting the monastery on Lindisfarne, an island off the northeastern coast of England. The attack was carried out by Norse seafarers and is often considered the beginning of the Viking Age. The monastery, founded in 635 AD by Saint Aidan, was a major centre of Christian learning in Northumbria. The Viking raiders plundered its wealth, killed or enslaved monks, and desecrated sacred relics. The event sent shockwaves through Christian Europe, with contemporaries interpreting it as divine punishment.

Following the raid, Viking incursions into the British Isles increased in frequency and scale. The attack on Lindisfarne foreshadowed later Norse settlements in England and the eventual establishment of the Danelaw. The monastery was later rebuilt, but its vulnerability led to shifts in defensive strategies across Anglo-Saxon England.

== Preparation ==
The sacking in 793 AD was preceded by a series of significant cultural and military developments in Scandinavia that facilitated the Viking raids across Europe. While no direct record exists outlining the exact preparations made by the raiders before the attack on Lindisfarne, historical context suggests a build-up of maritime and military capabilities in the Viking world during this period.

By the late 8th century, Scandinavian societies had become highly adept in shipbuilding, with the Vikings developing advanced longships that were fast, maneuverable, and capable of carrying a significant number of warriors. These ships were ideally suited for swift, surprise attacks on coastal settlements, as they could navigate both open seas and shallow rivers, allowing raiders to strike suddenly and retreat just as quickly.

The Viking raiders who attacked Lindisfarne likely organized the raid with the goal of plundering wealthy Christian monasteries along the coast, which were known for their riches and vulnerability. Although no specific leader of the raid is identified, the Vikings involved were part of a larger pattern of raiding expeditions, with earlier incursions targeting other parts of the British Isles and European coasts, such as the Irish Sea and northern France.

The sacking was a calculated assault by Viking raiders who exploited the monastery's vulnerabilities. Lindisfarne's remote location made it an isolated target with minimal defences against seafaring attackers. The Vikings' advanced seafaring skills and intimate knowledge of the coastal geography allowed them to execute swift and unexpected attacks, overwhelming the unprepared monastic community.

Thus, the preparation for the sacking of Lindisfarne can be understood as part of the broader Viking strategy of raiding wealthy, undefended Christian sites using their superior naval capabilities, creating a precedent for future Viking invasions of the British Isles.

== Massacre ==
The Viking raiders arrived in swift, shallow-draft longships, ideally suited for navigating both open seas and coastal waters. They landed on Lindisfarne's shores on 8 June 793, catching the monastic community unprepared. The attack was brutal: monks were slain, thrown into the sea to drown, or taken away as slaves; the church was plundered of its treasures, and sacred relics were desecrated. Contemporary accounts describe the horror of the event, with Alcuin, a Northumbrian scholar, lamenting, "Never before has such terror appeared in Britain as we have now suffered from a pagan race... The heathens poured out the blood of saints around the altar, and trampled on the bodies of saints in the temple of God."

The psychological impact of the raid was profound, sending shockwaves throughout Christian Europe. The Anglo-Saxon Chronicle recorded ominous portents preceding the attack, including "immense sheets of light rushing through the air" and "fiery dragons... flying in the sky". These events were interpreted as divine warnings, and the raid itself was seen as a manifestation of God's wrath.

While the physical devastation was significant, the monastic community on Lindisfarne endured. The site continued to be a centre of Christian worship, and the resilience of the monks symbolised the enduring strength of their faith in the face of such adversity.

== Aftermath ==
=== Impact on Lindisfarne's monastic community ===
In the immediate aftermath, the devastated monastery faced significant challenges. Despite the brutality of the raid, a resilient Christian community persisted on the island. Evidence of this continuity is found in artifacts such as the 'Domesday stone,' which records the event and signifies the community's determination to endure.

By 875 AD, escalating Viking incursions compelled the monks to abandon the island, taking with them the revered relics of St. Cuthbert.

=== Broader implications ===
The raid sent shockwaves throughout Christian Europe, shattering the perception of monasteries as sanctuaries protected from worldly violence. This event heralded the onset of the Viking Age, characterised by frequent Norse raids and settlements across Europe. The psychological impact was profound, leading to widespread fear and prompting changes in defensive strategies along coastal regions.

=== Re-establishment and legacy ===
Despite the turmoil, monastic life eventually returned to Lindisfarne. A new priory was constructed, and the island regained its spiritual significance. In the 13th and 14th centuries, the monastery faced renewed threats amid conflicts between the Scots and the English.

== Sources ==
- Grundy, John (2022). History of Northumberland. Newcastle upon Tyne: Tyne Bridge Publishing. ISBN 9781838280970.
